= Baranowski family with Ostoja coat of arms =

== Baranowski Coat of Arms Ostoja ==
Polish medieval CoA Ostoja

The Baranowski family - a Polish noble family with the Ostoja coat of arms, belonging to the heraldic Clan Ostoja (Moscics). They come from the Jerzykowski family of the Ostoja coat of arms from Jerzyków, located in the former poviat of Gniezno in the Province Poznań. The Baranowski family took their surname from the village of Baranowo, located in the former district of Kościanski of the Poznań Province, the nests of the Baranowski family of the Łodzia coat of arms, to which the Jerzykowski family were related on the distaff side. The Baranowski family were mentioned in the armorial of Bartosz Paprocki.

== The oldest source certificates concerning the family ==
Listed below are selected source certificates concerning the Baranowski family of the Ostoja coat of arms and the nesting villages of Jerzyków and Baranów, until the mid-15th century.

- The first mention of the village of Jerzykowo appears in a document from May 28, 1235, in which prince Władysław Odonic granted the village of Vehne, inhabited by the Jerzykowo family, to the Poznań church.
- The oldest known records about Baranów come from 1387. It was then that Paweł Naram from Baranów, along with his sons Bogusław and Naram, was in a dispute with Jan from Zbąszyń, the castellan of Łęczyca, about 27 fines for surety. This year, Bogusław from Baranów, son of Naram, sued Bodzęta from Karczew (near Grodzisk).
- According to Stanisław Kozierowski, at the end of the 14th century, Jerzykowo together with the village of Kowalskie were the seat of the Czewoy family.
- The first Jerzykowski belonging to the Ostoyy family was Mikołaj of Jerzyków, the castellan of Ostrów, who appeared in the sources in the years 1378-1390, who in 1380 gave the village of Gortatowo near Swarzędz to the chapter of the Poznań cathedral in exchange for the village of Jurzykowo with a mill. From the newly acquired goods, Mikołaj began to write with Jerzyków.
- In Jerzykowo, in 1389, Naram Ostrowski from Jerzykowo performed. Perhaps Naram was a close relative of Mikołaj of Jerzyków, the castellan of Ostrów (hence the name Narama Ostrowski)? The same Naram (actually Paweł Naram) appeared in the years 1387-1390 as the owner of the property in Baranów.
- Mikołaj of Jerzyków, the castellan of Ostrów, in 1390 led a dispute over 15 fines with Paweł Naram from Baranów.
- In 1422, Adam, the heir of the Kowalski and Jerzyków, appears in the Poznań township and land registers.
- In 1435, Bogusław of Baranów, son of Naram, left his wife Dorota 50 pennies in the dowry and the same dowry for half of the property in Baranów. The same Bogusław in 1445 was in dispute with Jarosław from Doków Suchy.
- In 1449 brothers Piotr and Aleksander of Jerzyków appear in the town and land registers of Gniezno.

== The estates belonging to the family ==
Listed below are the most important lands belonging to the Baranowski family, Ostoja coat of arms and their ancestors, the Jerzykowski family.

Jerzykowo, Baranowo, Gortatowo, Kowalskie, Kozarzew, Gorazdowo, Borkowo, Psarskie, Stanomin, Wola Stanomińska, Szyszłowo, Komorowo, Ostrołęka, Pilica, Chmielew, Ługowa Wola, Czychry (Cychry), Łękawica, Zakrzew, Szczyty, Brześce, Ostrówki.

== Family representatives ==
- Mikołaj of Jerzyków Jerzykowski (died after 1390) - the heir of Gortatów and Jerzyków, the castellan of Ostrów.
- Stanisław Baranowski (died after 1531) - parish priest in Modrze, altarist in the Poznań cathedral.
- Wojciech Jerzykowski (Baranowski) (died after 1560) - the owner of land estates in Kozarzew, Gorazdów, Borek and Psarskie. He got married twice. His first wife was Katarzyna Iwańska and the second was Dorota Palędzka. According to prof. Włodzimierz Dworzaczka was the first Jerzykowski to use the surname Baranowski.
- Jan Baranowski (died after 1572) - servant (clerk) of Jan Tęczyński, the Lublin capitan.
- Stanisław Baranowski (died before 1594) - heir of Stanomin and Wola, owner of parts in Łabiszynek and Wola. He was the son of Wojciech Jerzykowski and Katarzyna Iwienska. His wife was Małgorzata Racięska.
- Dobrogost Baranowski (Irzykowski, Jerzykowski) (died after 1597) - heir in Kozarzew, land burgrave of Konin. He was the son of Wojciech Jerzykowski and Katarzyna Iwienska.
- Marcin Baranowski (died before 1601) - owner of the estate in Stanomin, writer of the land of Inowrocław. The parents of Marcin Baranowski were - Małgorzata Racięcka (Racięska) and Stanisław Baranowski (sometimes Jerzykowski), heir of Stanomin and Wola in the Inowrocław land.
- Stanisław of Jerzyków Baranowski (died after 1623) - heir of some in Stanomin and Wola Stanomińska. He was the son of Stanisław and Małgorzata Racięcka (Racięska). His wife was Zofia Gnińska, daughter of Kasper and Dorota from Woźniki.
- Jan Baranowski (died after 1641) - the righteous of the town of Łabiszyn with its adjoining areas, the Bydgoszcz and Inowrocław town writer, the Bydgoszcz town judge, the representative of Jerzy Ossoliński, the Crown Deputy Chancellor. He was the son of Stanisław Baranowsi, heir of part of Stanomin, and Zofia née Gnińska. His great-grandfather was Wojciech Jerzykowski.
- Jan Baranowski (died after 1652) - a colonel in the hussars of the Ukrainian banners of prince Jeremy Wiśniowiecki, the Bracławski table. During the Khmelnytsky Uprising he took part in the battle of Konstantynów, the defense of Zbaraż and the battle of Berestechko.
- Wawrzyniec Baranowski (died 1658) - cupbearer of Bracław, cavalry captain of the chosen infantry.
- Jan Baranowski (died 1699) - heir of Ostrołęka and Pilica, colonel of cavalry, swordfish from Bracław. He was the son of Wawrzyniec Baranowski, cupbearer of Bracław. His spouse was Elżbieta Młochowska.
- Jan Aleksander Baranowski (died after 1704) - the cupbearer of Lviv. His spouse was Anna Ubysz.
- Piotr Bogusław Baranowski (died after 1709) - the owner of Chmielew, cupbearer of Bracław, an officer in Józef Lubomirski's Hussar banner, took part in wars with Turkey, from 1689 the marshal of the military confederation established near Wiśniowiec. He was the son of Jan and Elżbieta née Młochowska. His wife was Eufrozyna Kulikowska.
- Aleksander Baranowski (died after 1724) - captain in the regiment of Ludwik Konstanty Pociej, major in the Lithuanian army. In 1724 he was granted the mayor in Brzozówka. He was the son of Franciszek and Jadwiga Lesiewska. His spouse was Brygida Magnuszewska. His paternal grandfather was Jan Baranowski, a municipal judge in Bydgoszcz.
- Mikołaj Baranowski (died after 1733) - the owner of the lands in Pilica, Łękawica and Zakrzewo, judge hood from Czerski, cupbearer of Bracław. He was the son of Jan Baranowski, swordfish from Bracław and Elżbieta Młochowska. He was married twice. His first wife was Zuzanna Szałapska and the second was Anna Laskowska.
- Stefan Baranowski (died after 1749) - the heir of Pilica, a cup-bearer from Bracław. He was the son of Jan Baranowski and Anna Wyleżyńska. His spouse was Ludwika Mierzyńska.
- Jerzy Baranowski (died after 1763) - heir of Pilica, cupbearer of Lubaczów. He was the son of Jan Baranowski and Anna Wyleżyńska.
- Michał Antoni Baranowski (died after 1764) - the owner of the landed estates in Ługowa Wola, Cychry, the owner of the vogt's office in Długowola, the hood judge from Czersk, the Czersk court bailiffs, the border bailiff from the Czersk region, the hunter from the Czersk region. He was the son of Aleksander Baranowski, major of the Lithuanian army, and Brygida Magnuszewska. His spouse was Anna Pęczelska.
- Antoni Baranowski (born 1760) - major general of the Crown forces, a Kościuszko insurgent. Son of Michał Antoni, the provincial governor of Czersk and Anna née Pęczelska.
- Florian Baranowski (died after 1764) - cupbearer of Bracław, elector of King Stanisław August Poniatowski, owner of landed estates: Pilica, Łękawica, Zakrzew, Szczyty, Brześce. He was the son of Mikołaj Baranowski, cup-bearer of Bracław and Anna Laskowski. He got married twice. His first wife was his cousin Józefa Baranowska, daughter Bogusław and the second Ewa Łaska.
- Andrzej Baranowski (died after 1786) - governors of Czersk. He was the son of Michał Antoni, hood judge from Czerski and Anna née Pęczalska. In 1786 he relinquished his paternal estate to his brothers. His spouse was Katarzyna Zalewska.
- Ignacy Walenty Baranowski (died after 1791) - burgrave Czerski, vicesgerent. He was the son of Florian Baranowski, cupbearer of Bracław.
- Antoni Baranowski (died after 1802) - Catholic priest, canon of Smolensk, vice-dean of Przytycki, parish priest of Jasień, rector of Radzanów, notary of the consistory in Skrzynno. In the years 1791–1802 he was the parish priest in Radzanów and at the same time in Jasionna. In 1799 he conducted a census of the Radzanów parish, which is a valuable source of information about the local community and the economic situation of parishioners at that time. He was the son of Florian Baranowski, cupbearer of Bracław.
- Florian Baranowski (died after 1802) - the captain of the Lidzki land. He was the husband of Józefa Krzywobłodzka, with whom he had a son, Julian, who was certified as noble in the Kingdom of Poland under the Ostoja coat of arms in 1843.
- Jarosław Baranowski (1888-1940) - 2nd Lt. Wojska Polskiego, graduate of the Faculty of Economics of the Polytechnic University in Petrograd, director of a private gymnasium in Baranavichy. He was born on the estate of Ostrówki, ihumeński land, of the Minsk land in the family of the landed gentry of Ludwik and Jadwiga née Witkowski. He was married to Jadwiga Szamraj. He was murdered in the Katyn Forest by the NKVD in 1940. Exhumed from the pit of death, identified under number 2209. In 2011, a commemorative plaque was unveiled in his honor.

== See also ==
- Ostoja coat of arms
- Clan Ostoja (Moscics)
- Jerzykowscy herbu Ostoja

== Bibliography ==
- Teki Dworzaczka. Materiały historyczno-genealogiczne do dziejów szlachty wielkopolskiej XV-XX w., Biblioteka Kórnicka PAN, Kórnik-Poznań 1995-2019 - Teki Dworzaczka.
- T. Jurek (red.), Słownik historyczno-geograficzny ziem polskich w średniowieczu, Instytut Historii Polskiej Akademii Nauk, 2010-2019, Poznań, część I, s. 11-13.
- K. Niesiecki, Herbarz polski, wyd. J.N. Bobrowicz, Lipsk 1839-1845, t. II, s. 62, t. IV, s. 490.
- A. Boniecki, Herbarz polski, Warszawa 1899, t. I, s. 101-107.
- S. Uruski, Rodzina. Herbarz szlachty polskiej, Warszawa 1904, t. I, s. 89-90.
- B. Paprocki, Herby rycerstwa polskiego przez Bartosza Paprockiego zebrane i wydane r. p. 1584, wydanie Kazimierza Józefa Turowskiego, Kraków, Biblioteka Polska, 1858, s. 371.
- R. Kalinowski, Protoheraldyczny znak na portalu kościoła w Wysocicach a historia herbu Ostoja w średniowieczu, Rocznik Polskiego Towarzystwa Heraldycznego nowej serii, t. XV (XXVI).
- Z. Cieplucha, Z przeszłości ziemi Kościańskiej, Kościan 1929.
