= Jerzykowski family with Ostoja coat of arms =

Polish medieval CoA Ostoja

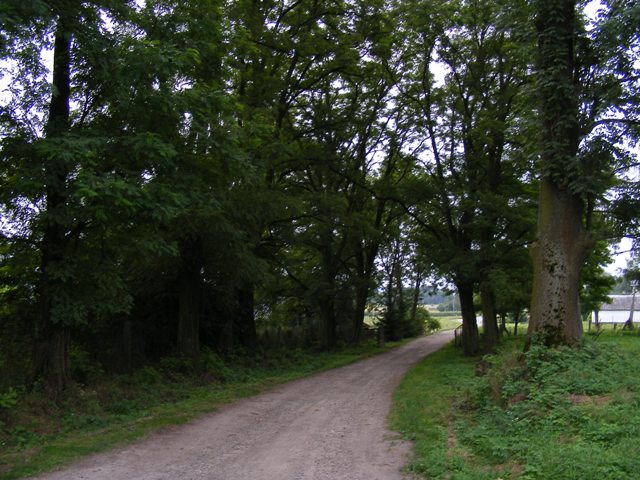
The alley that used to lead to the Jasiona manor in Błażkowa, an estate belonging to the Jerzykowski family

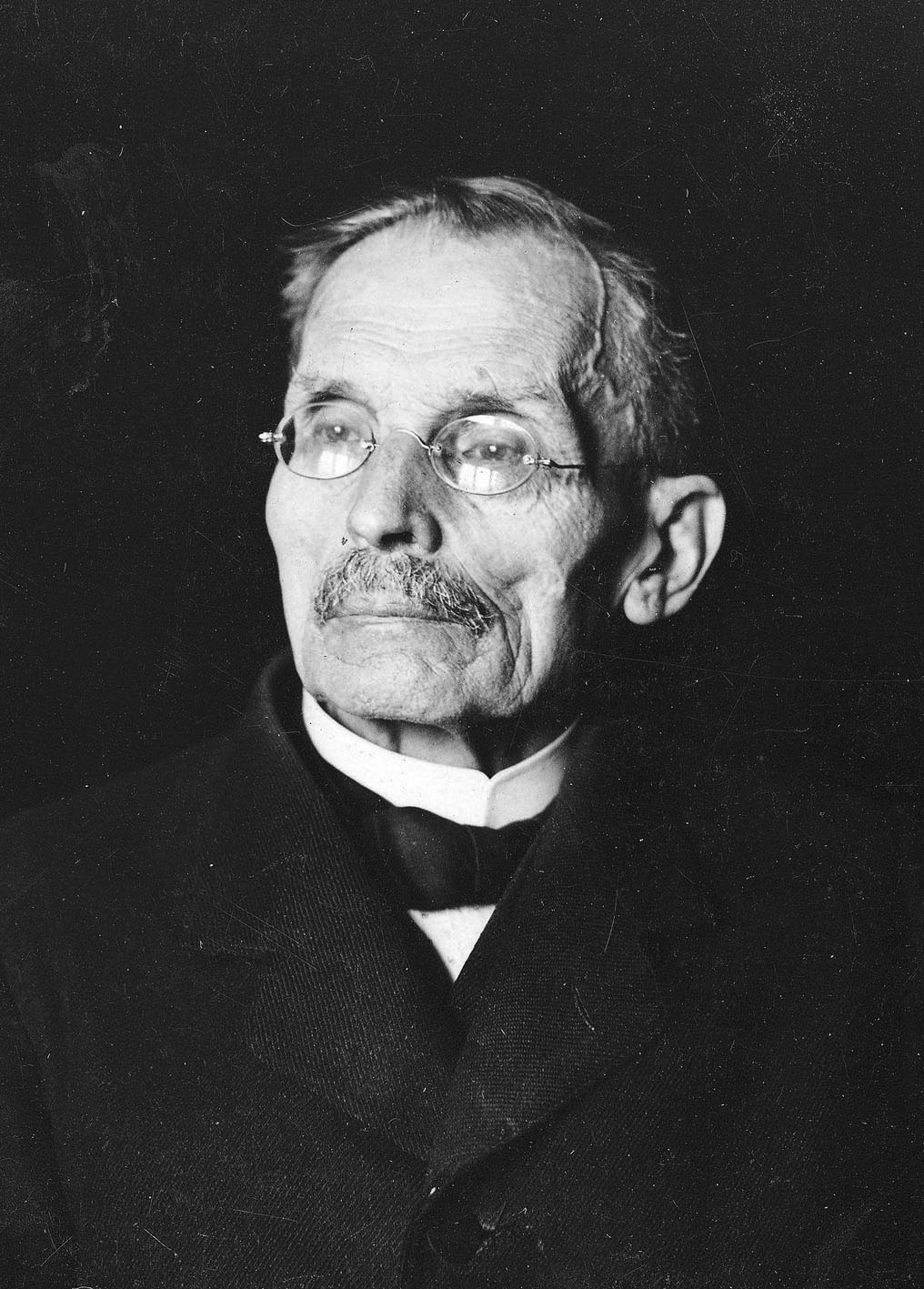
Stanisław Jerzykowski (1847-1927), an outstanding physician

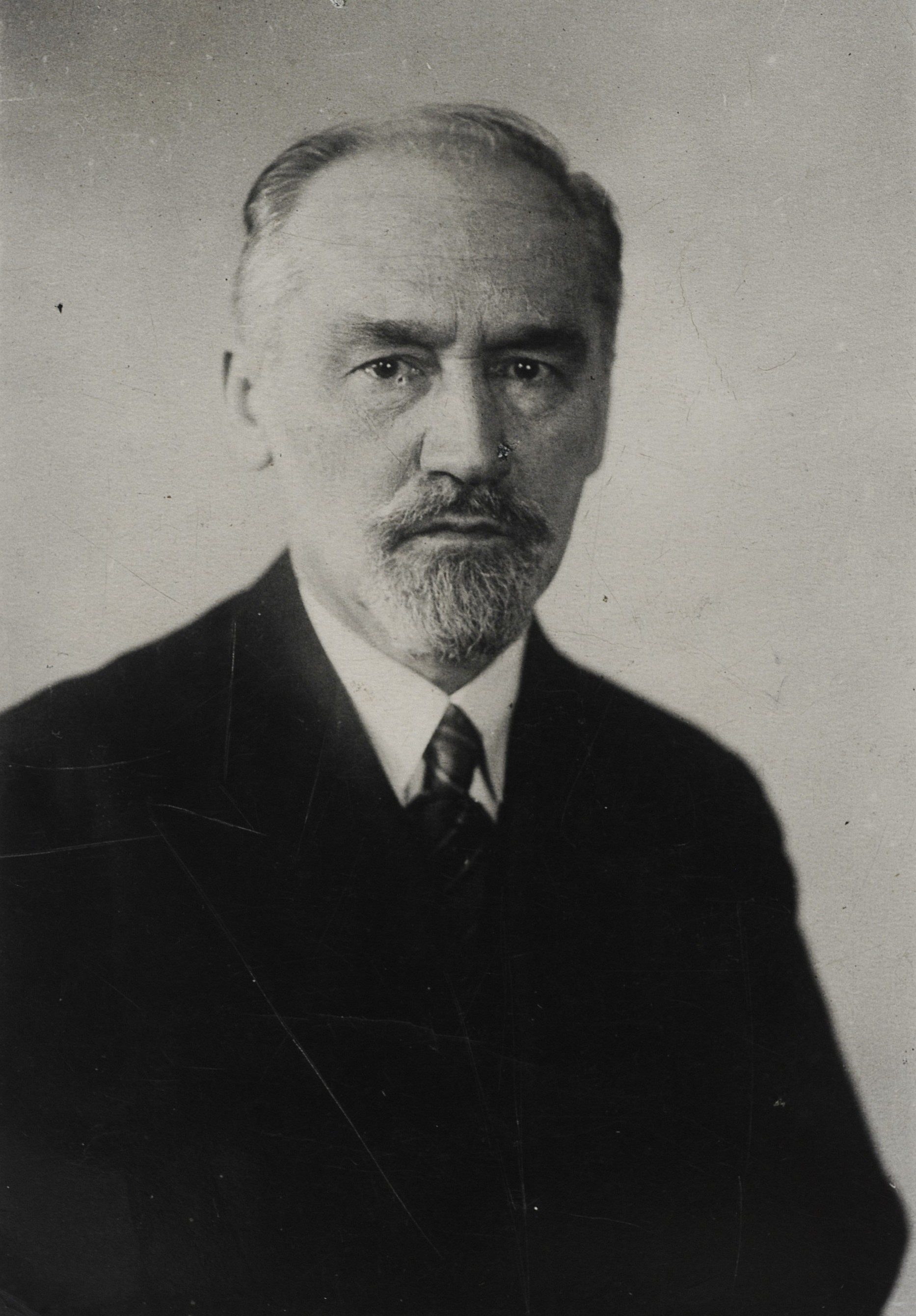
Karol Irzykowski (1873-1944), an outstanding writer

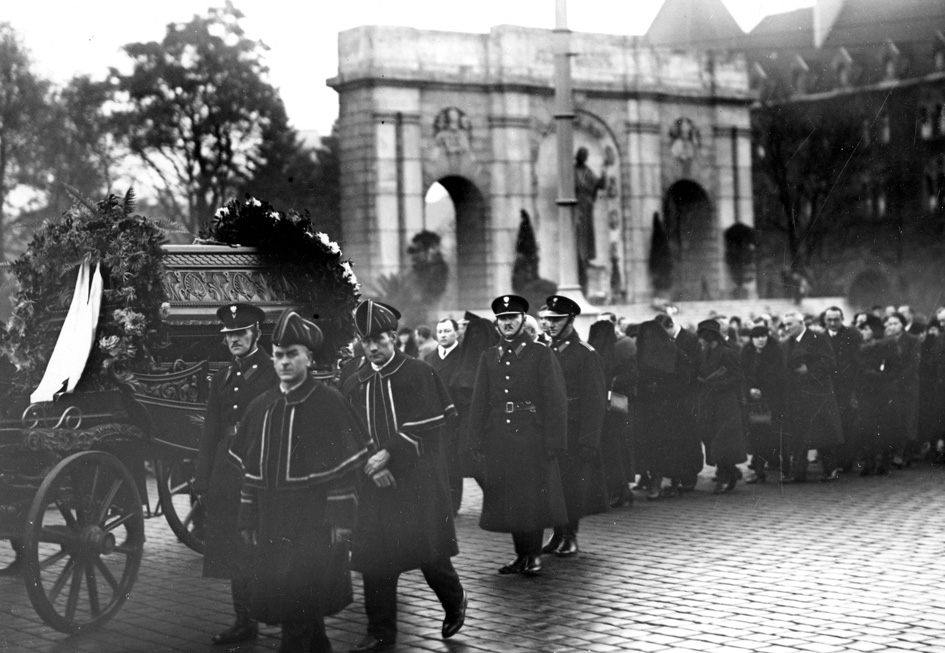
The funeral of Zbigniew Jerzykowski, the starost of Poznań in 1937.

The Jerzykowski (Jurzykowscy, Irzykowski) family - Polish noble family with the coat of arms of Ostoja, belonging to the heraldic Clan Ostoja (Moscics). The Jerzykowski family took their surname from the village of Jurzykowo (now Jerzykowo near Pobiedziska), located in the former district of Gniezno in the province of Poznań. The Jerzykowski family was mentioned in the armorial of Bartosz Paprocki. The Baranowski of the Ostoja coat of arms come from the Jerzykowski family.

== The oldest source certificates concerning the family ==
Listed below are selected source certificates concerning the Jerzykowski family of the Ostoja CoA and the nest village of Jerzykowo, until the mid-15th century.

- The first mention of the village of Jerzykowo appears in a document from May 28, 1235, in which prince Władysław Odonic granted the village of Vehne, inhabited by the Jerzykowo family, to the Poznań church.
- According to Stanisław Kozierowski, at the end of the 14th century, Jerzykowo together with the village of Kowalskie were the seat of the Czewoy family.
- The first Jerzykowski belonging to the Clan Ostoja was Mikołaj of Jerzyków, the castellan of Ostrów, who appeared in the sources in the years 1378–1390, who in 1380 gave the village of Gortatowo near Swarzędz to the chapter of the Poznań cathedral in exchange for the village of Jurzykowo with a mill. From the newly acquired goods, Mikołaj began to write from Jerzyków.
- In Jerzykowo, in 1389, Naram Ostrowski from Jerzykowo performed. Perhaps Naram was a close relative of Mikołaj of Jerzyków, the castellan of Ostrów (hence the name Narama Ostowski)? The same Naram (actually Paweł Naram) appeared in the years 1387-1390 as the owner of the property in Baranów. Perhaps the same Naram in 1393 was the owner of Sierosław, and in the years 1396-99 the mortgagee owner of Rosnowo.
- Mikołaj of Jerzyków, the castellan of Ostrów, in 1390 led a dispute over 15 fines with Paweł Naram from Baranów.
- In 1422, Adam, the heir of the Kowalski and Jerzyków, appears in the Poznań township and land registers.
- In 1449 brothers Piotr and Aleksander of Jerzyków appear in the town and land registers of Gniezno.

== The estates belonging to the family ==
Listed below are the most important lands belonging to the Jerzykowski family with Ostoja coat of arms.

Jerzykowo, Gortatowo, Szyszłowo, Kowalskie, Komorowo, Baranowo, Kozarzew, Gorazdowo, Borkowo, Psarskie, Kościeszki, Białężyn, Oborzyska, Rosnowo, Jarosławiec, Błażkowa, Wilanowiec, Niewierz.

== Family representatives ==
- Mikołaj of Jerzyków Jerzykowski (died after 1390) - the heir of Gortatów and Jerzykówo, the castellan of Ostrów.
- Jan Jurzykowski (died after 1478) - heir of the estates in Jerzykówo and Graboszewo, priest, parson in Wronczyn, rector of the parish church in Graboszewo.
- Aleksander Irzykowski (died after 1516) - heir of Jerzykówo, Kowalski and Komorówo, the court of Kalisz, the land burgrave of Konin, the burgrave of the Łowicz castle. He was the son of Szymon and Katarzyna, heirs in Jerzyków. He equipped two soldiers with his goods for a Wallachian military expedition in 1497.
- Wojciech Jerzykowski (Baranowski) (died before 1582) - the owner of land estates in Kozarzew, Gorazdów, Borkowo and Psarskie.
- Dobrogost Jerzykowski (Irzykowski, Baranowski) (died after 1597) - heir in Kozarzew, land burgrave of Konin. He was the son of Wojciech Jerzykowski and Katarzyna Iwienska.
- Maciej Jerzykowski (died after 1659) - regent of the Poznań town chancellery.
- Jan Franciszek Jerzykowski (Irzykowski) (died before 1702) - heir of Łosiniec, Kościeszek, Białężyna, Oborzyska and others, burgrave of Poznań town, Poznań town regent, and Kosciński town writer. He was the son of Andrzej and Helena née Wilkowski. He got married several times. His first spouse was Marianna Katarzyna Komorowska, the daughter of Stanisław and Zofia née Rostrzębów Obodowska, the second was Urszula Szołdrska, the daughter of Marcin and Zofia née Cielecka, and the third was Agnieszka Rolanka Bratuska, the daughter of Samuel and Jadwiga Pruska, widow of Walentyna Raczyński.
- Andrzej Jerzykowski (died after 1679) - heir of Kościeszek, priest. He was the son of Andrzej and Jadwiga Katarzyna Wolska. His half-brother was Jan Franciszek Jerzykowski. He sold his share in Kościeszki to his brother Marcin in 1679.
- Stefan Jerzykowski (died after 1752) - heir of Oborzysk, burgrave of the town of Poznań. He was the son of Jan Franciszek Jerzykowski, a writer from Kościan, and Urszula Szołdrska.
- Antoni Jerzykowski (1819-1889) - professor, doctor, Polish classical philologist, educator. Stanisław Jerzykowski's father. His spouse was Rozalia Zwolska.
- Marceli Tadeusz Jerzykowski (1842–1884) - an official of the Kingdom of Poland, an enumerator of the 2nd class of the Control and Accounting Office in the Government Commission for Internal and Spiritual Affairs, an enumerator in the Accounting Section of the Confessions Department of the Government Commission for Religious Denominations and Public Enlightenment, collegial secretary, intendant of the Alexandrian Institute of Education virgins. He was the son of Franciszek and Katarzyna Kostecka. He married Julia Krystyna Henrich in 1837.
- Stanisław Jerzykowski (1847-1927) - Polish physician, social activist. The son of prof. Antoni Jerzykowski and Rozalia née Zwolska. Husband of Maria Jadwiga Jagielska.
- Karol Irzykowski (1873-1944) - Polish literary and film critic, poet, prose writer, playwright, film theorist, translator, chess player. He was the son of Czesław Irzykowski and Julianna née Ławrowska.
- Zbigniew Jerzykowski (1881-1937) - doctor of philosophy, starosts of Chodzież and Poznań, president of the Association of Starosts in Poznań Province, member of the Provincial Assembly, owner of Wilanówec. Decorated with the Order of Polonia Restituta, the Gold Cross of Merit and the Order of the "Humulls Crown". He was the son of Stanisław Jerzykowski and Maria née Jagieiska.

== See also ==
- Ostoja CoA
- Clan Ostoja (Moscics)
- Baranowski CoA Ostoja

== Bibliography ==
- Teki Dworzaczka. Materiały historyczno-genealogiczne do dziejów szlachty wielkopolskiej XV-XX w., Biblioteka Kórnicka PAN, Kórnik-Poznań 1995-2019 - Teki Dworzaczka.
- T. Jurek (red.), Słownik historyczno-geograficzny ziem polskich w średniowieczu, Instytut Historii Polskiej Akademii Nauk, 2010–2019, Poznań, część I, s. 11–13, 594.
- K. Niesiecki, Herbarz polski, wyd. J.N. Bobrowicz, Lipsk 1839–1845, t. IV, s. 490.
- A. Boniecki, Herbarz polski, Warszawa 1902, t. IX, s. 25.
- S. Uruski, Rodzina. Herbarz szlachty polskiej, Warszawa 1908–9, t. V, s. 265, t. VI, s. 68–69.
- R. Kalinowski, Protoheraldyczny znak na portalu kościoła w Wysocicach a historia herbu Ostoja w średniowieczu, Rocznik Polskiego Towarzystwa Heraldycznego nowej serii, t. XV (XXVI).
- Z. Cieplucha, Z przeszłości ziemi Kościańskiej, Kościan 1929.
