= Dębowiec =

Dębowiec or Dębówiec may refer to the following villages in Poland:

- Dębowiec, Konin County in Greater Poland Voivodeship (west-central Poland)
- Dębowiec, Krotoszyn County in Greater Poland Voivodeship (west-central Poland)
- Dębowiec, Międzychód County in Greater Poland Voivodeship (west-central Poland)
- Dębówiec, Gniezno County in Greater Poland Voivodeship (west-central Poland)
- Dębówiec, Konin County in Greater Poland Voivodeship (west-central Poland)
- Dębówiec, Krotoszyn County in Greater Poland Voivodeship (west-central Poland)
- Dębowiec, Lower Silesian Voivodeship (south-west Poland)
- Dębowiec, Bydgoszcz County in Kuyavian-Pomeranian Voivodeship (north-central Poland)
- Dębowiec, Sępólno County in Kuyavian-Pomeranian Voivodeship (north-central Poland)
- Dębowiec, Tuchola County in Kuyavian-Pomeranian Voivodeship (north-central Poland)
- Dębowiec, Łódź Voivodeship (central Poland)
- Dębowiec, Kraśnik County in Lublin Voivodeship (east Poland)
- Dębowiec, Włodawa County in Lublin Voivodeship (east Poland)
- Dębowiec, Zamość County in Lublin Voivodeship (east Poland)
- Dębowiec, Lubusz Voivodeship (west Poland)
- Dębowiec, Opole Voivodeship (south-west Poland)
- Dębowiec, Pomeranian Voivodeship (north Poland)
- Dębowiec, Częstochowa County in Silesian Voivodeship (south Poland)
- Dębowiec, Myszków County in Silesian Voivodeship (south Poland)
- Dębowiec, Cieszyn County in Silesian Voivodeship (south Poland)
- Dębowiec, Subcarpathian Voivodeship (south-east Poland)
- Dębowiec, Świętokrzyskie Voivodeship (south-central Poland)
- Dębowiec, Braniewo County in Warmian-Masurian Voivodeship (north Poland)
- Dębowiec, Działdowo County in Warmian-Masurian Voivodeship (north Poland)
- Dębowiec, Szczytno County in Warmian-Masurian Voivodeship (north Poland)
