= Chlewiska =

Chlewiska may refer to the following places in Poland:

- Chlewiska, Kuyavian-Pomeranian Voivodeship (north-central Poland)
- Chlewiska, Lublin Voivodeship (east Poland)
- Chlewiska, Siedlce County in Masovian Voivodeship (east-central Poland)
- Chlewiska, Subcarpathian Voivodeship (south-east Poland)
- Chlewiska, Szydłowiec County in Masovian Voivodeship (east-central Poland)
- Chlewiska, Greater Poland Voivodeship (west-central Poland)
