= Wilczyn Lake =

Lake in Poland

Wilczyńskie Lake
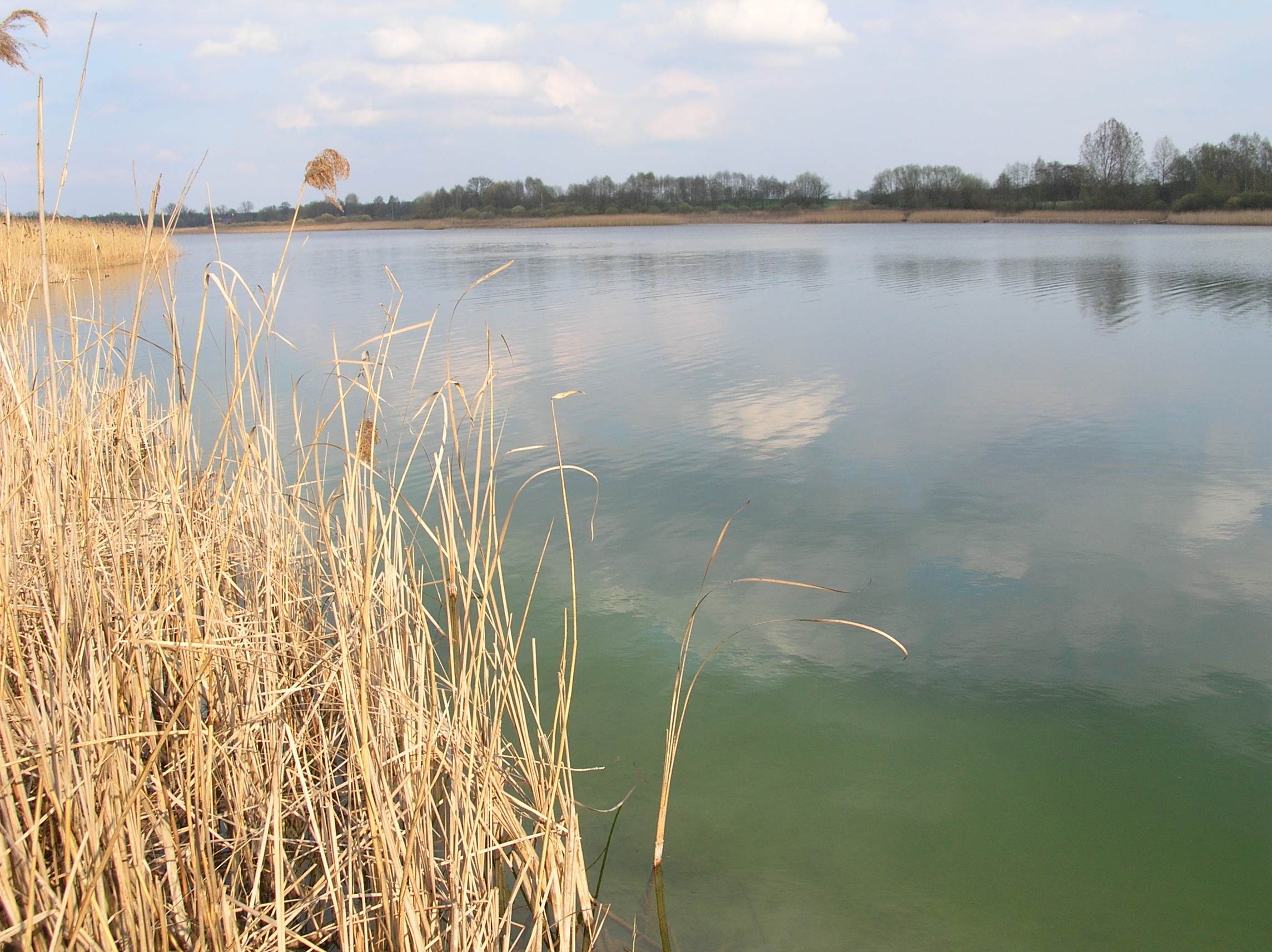

- Location within Greater Poland Voivodeship
- Location: Gmina Wilczyn, Greater Poland Voivodeship
- Coordinates: 52°28′55″N 18°06′58″E
- Basin countries: Poland
- Max. length: 5.5 km (3.4 mi)
- Max. width: 0.6 km (0.37 mi)
- Surface area: 1.738 km^{2} (0.671 sq mi)
- Average depth: 7.3 m (24 ft)
- Max. depth: 24.9 m (82 ft)
- Settlements: Wilczyn

Wilczyn Lake (Polish: Jezioro Wilczyńskie) is a ribbon lake in Gmina Wilczyn, Konin County, Greater Poland Voivodeship, north-central Poland, near the village of Wilczyn.

In 2011, there was much concernabout the lake drying up and disappearing due to nearby lignite coal mines. This concern was expressed again in 2016.

== Morphometric data ==
The area of the lake's water table is 173.5 hectares (429 acres). The average depth is 7.3 metres (24 ft), while the maximum depth is 23.2 metres (76 ft). The water table is located at a height of 99 metres (325 ft) above sea level.
