= Chrostowo =

Chrostowo may refer to the following places in Poland:

- Chrostowo, Masovian Voivodeship
- Chrostowo, Podlaskie Voivodeship
- Chróstowo, Kuyavian-Pomeranian Voivodeship
- Chróstowo, Pomeranian Voivodeship
- Chróstowo, West Pomeranian Voivodeship
