= Wilczogóra =

Wilczogóra may refer to the following places:

- Wilczogóra, Greater Poland Voivodeship (west-central Poland)
- Wilczogóra, Grójec County in Masovian Voivodeship (east-central Poland)
- Wilczogóra, Sierpc County in Masovian Voivodeship (east-central Poland)
- Wilczogóra, West Pomeranian Voivodeship (north-west Poland)
