= Pieczyska =

Pieczyska may refer to the following places:

- Pieczyska, Inowrocław County in Kuyavian-Pomeranian Voivodeship (north-central Poland)
- Pieczyska, Sieradz County in Łódź Voivodeship (central Poland)
- Pieczyska, Wieruszów County in Łódź Voivodeship (central Poland)
- Pieczyska, Grójec County in Masovian Voivodeship (east-central Poland)
- Pieczyska, Kalisz County in Greater Poland Voivodeship (west-central Poland)
- Pieczyska, Ostrzeszów County in Greater Poland Voivodeship (west-central Poland)
- Pieczyska, Opole Voivodeship (south-west Poland)
- Pieczyska, Kartuzy County in Pomeranian Voivodeship (north Poland)
- Pieczyska, Starogard County in Pomeranian Voivodeship (north Poland)
- Pieczyska, Koszalin County in West Pomeranian Voivodeship (north-west Poland)
- Pieczyska, Wałcz County in West Pomeranian Voivodeship (north-west Poland)
