= Mrówki =

Mrówki may refer to the following places:

- Mrówki, Greater Poland Voivodeship (west-central Poland)
- Mrówki, Podlaskie Voivodeship (north-east Poland)
- Mrówki, Warmian-Masurian Voivodeship (north Poland)
