= Pyszczyn =

Pyszczyn may refer to the following places in Poland:

- Pyszczyn, Lower Silesian Voivodeship (south-west Poland)
- Pyszczyn, Kuyavian-Pomeranian Voivodeship (north-central Poland)
- Pyszczyn, Greater Poland Voivodeship (west-central Poland)
