= Modliborzyce =

Modliborzyce may refer to several places:

- Modliborzyce, Kuyavian-Pomeranian Voivodeship (north-central Poland)
- Modliborzyce, Lublin Voivodeship (east Poland)
- Modliborzyce, Świętokrzyskie Voivodeship (south-central Poland)
- Modliborzyce Commune
