= Głęboczek, Konin County =

Głęboczek
- Village
- Location within Poland
- Coordinates: 52°28′02″N 18°14′31″E
- Country: Poland
- Voivodeship: Greater Poland
- County: Konin
- Gmina: Wilczyn

Głęboczek [ɡwɛmˈbɔt͡ʂɛk] is a village in the administrative district of Gmina Wilczyn, within Konin County, Greater Poland Voivodeship, in west-central Poland.
