= Cegielnia, Gmina Wilczyn =

Cegielnia
- Village
- Location within Poland
- Coordinates: 52°29′5.9″N 18°07′34.11″E
- Country: Poland
- Voivodeship: Greater Poland
- County: Konin
- Gmina: Wilczyn

Cegielnia [t͡sɛˈɡʲɛlɲa] is a village in the administrative district of Gmina Wilczyn, within Konin County, Greater Poland Voivodeship, in west-central Poland.
