= Parchanie =

- Village
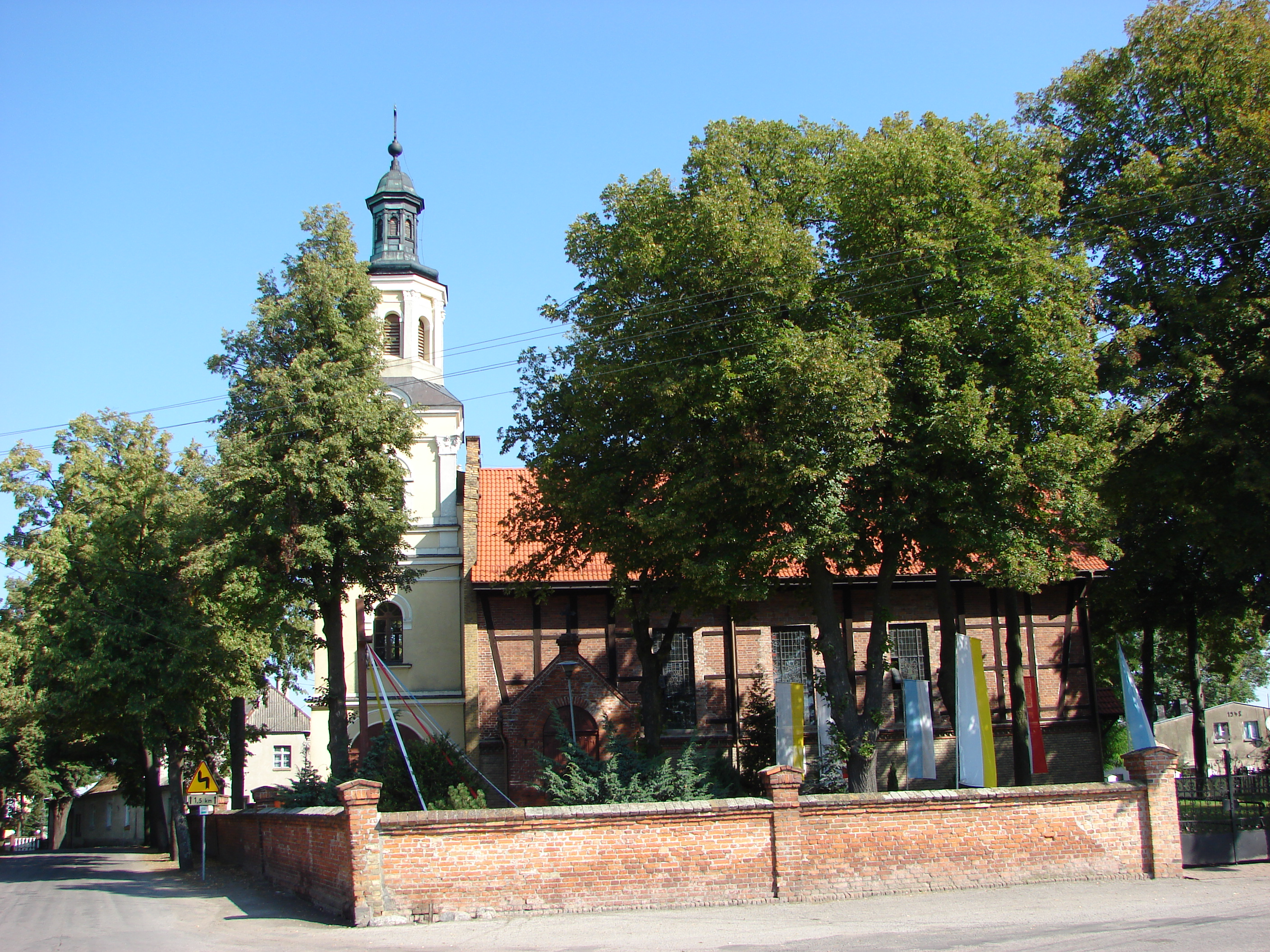
- Saint Adalbert's church was built in 1840.

- Location within Poland
- Coordinates: 52°49′N 18°24′E
- Country: Poland
- Voivodeship: Kuyavian-Pomeranian
- County: Inowrocław
- Gmina: Dąbrowa Biskupia

Parchanie [parˈxaɲɛ] is a village in the administrative district of Gmina Dąbrowa Biskupia, within Inowrocław County, Kuyavian-Pomeranian Voivodeship, in north-central Poland.
