= Zdziechowa =

- Village
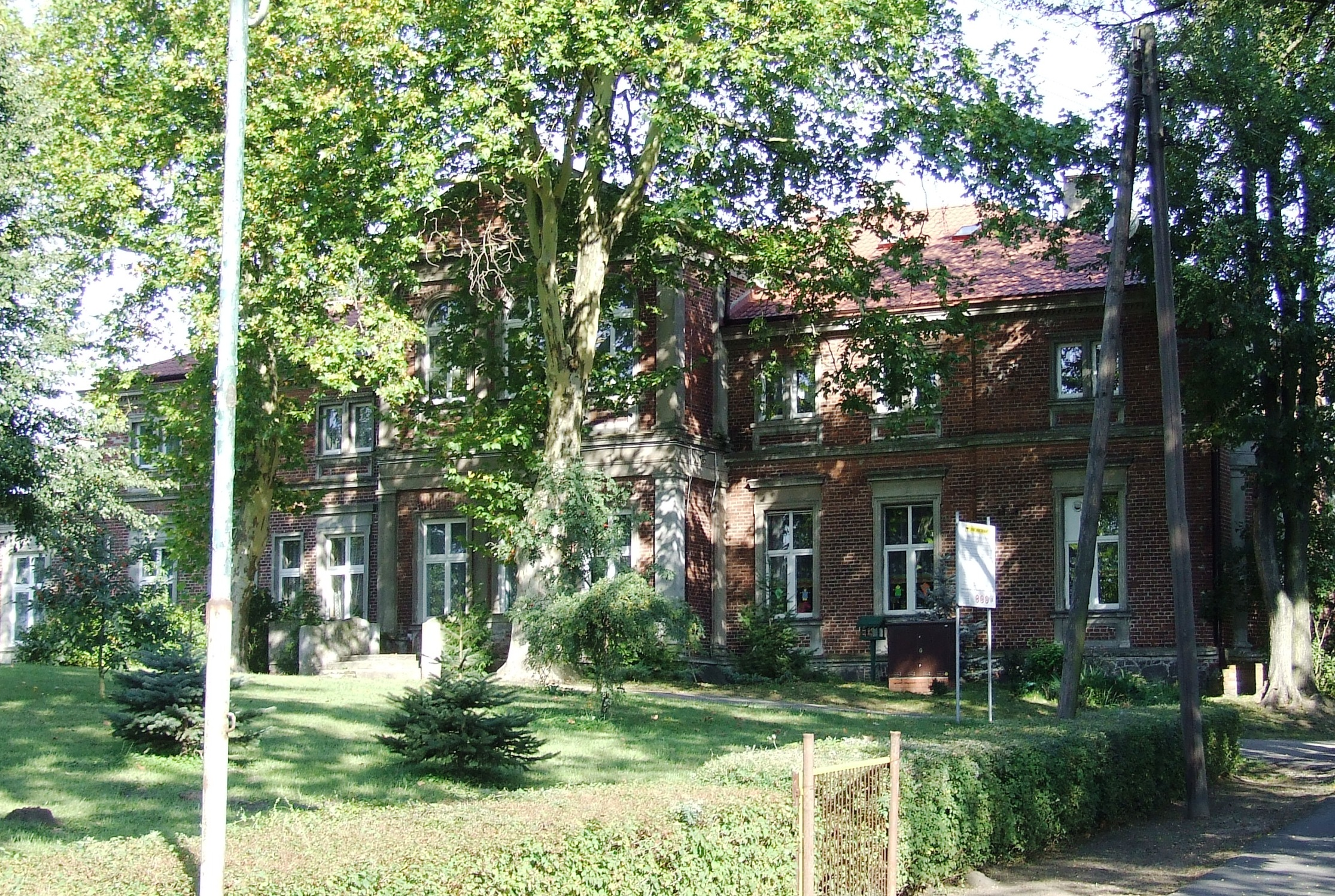
- Old manor house in Zdziechowa

- Location within Poland
- Coordinates: 52°35′N 17°34′E
- Country: Poland
- Voivodeship: Greater Poland
- County: Gniezno
- Gmina: Gniezno
- Population: 750
- Time zone: UTC+1 (CET)
  - Summer (DST): UTC+2 (CEST)
- Vehicle registration: PGN

Zdziechowa [zd͡ʑɛˈxɔva] is a village in the administrative district of Gmina Gniezno, within Gniezno County, Greater Poland Voivodeship, in west-central Poland.

== History ==
As part of the region of Greater Poland, i.e. the cradle of the Polish state, the area formed part of Poland since its establishment in the 10th century. Zdziechowa was a private church village of the monastery in Gniezno, administratively located in the Gniezno County in the Kalisz Voivodeship in the Greater Poland Province of the Kingdom of Poland. It was annexed by Prussia in the Second Partition of Poland in 1793. It was regained by Poles in 1807 and included within the short-lived Duchy of Warsaw, and after the duchy's dissolution in 1815, the village was reannexed by Prussia, and was also part of Germany from 1871. Following World War I, in 1918, Poland regained independence and the Greater Poland uprising broke out, which goal was to reunite the region with the reborn Polish state. On 30–31 December 1918 the village was the site of the Battle of Zdziechowa, in which Polish insurgents defeated German troops.

On 10 September 1939, during the German invasion of Poland which started World War II, German troops carried out a massacre of 24 Poles from the region, incl. from Zdziechowa itself, in the village (see Nazi crimes against the Polish nation). During the subsequent German occupation, in 1939 and 1942, the occupiers also carried out expulsions of Poles, who were then placed in a transit camp in nearby Gniezno, while their houses and farms were handed over to German colonists as part of the Lebensraum policy. Poles expelled in 1939 were eventually deported to the General Government in the more eastern part of German-occupied Poland, whereas Poles expelled in 1942 were deported to forced labour in Germany.
