= Brudnia =

- Village
- Location within Poland
- Coordinates: 52°48′N 18°30′E
- Country: Poland
- Voivodeship: Kuyavian-Pomeranian
- County: Inowrocław
- Gmina: Dąbrowa Biskupia

Brudnia [ˈbrudɲa] is a village in the administrative district of Gmina Dąbrowa Biskupia, within Inowrocław County, Kuyavian-Pomeranian Voivodeship, in north-central Poland.
