= Wacławowo =

- Village
- Location within Poland
- Coordinates: 52°27′53″N 18°07′32″E
- Country: Poland
- Voivodeship: Greater Poland
- County: Konin
- Gmina: Wilczyn

Wacławowo [vat͡swaˈvɔvɔ] is a village in the administrative district of Gmina Wilczyn, within Konin County, Greater Poland Voivodeship, in west-central Poland.
