= Wygorzele, Greater Poland Voivodeship =

Wygorzele
- Village
- Location within Poland
- Coordinates: 52°28′14″N 18°06′49″E
- Country: Poland
- Voivodeship: Greater Poland
- County: Konin
- Gmina: Wilczyn

Wygorzele [vɨɡɔˈʐɛlɛ] is a village in the administrative district of Gmina Wilczyn, within Konin County, Greater Poland Voivodeship, in west-central Poland.
