= Zagajewice, Inowrocław County =

Zagajewice
- Village
- Location within Poland
- Coordinates: 52°49′57″N 18°28′37″E
- Country: Poland
- Voivodeship: Kuyavian-Pomeranian
- County: Inowrocław
- Gmina: Dąbrowa Biskupia
- Population: 110

Zagajewice [zaɡajɛˈvit͡sɛ] is a village in the administrative district of Gmina Dąbrowa Biskupia, within Inowrocław County, Kuyavian-Pomeranian Voivodeship, in north-central Poland.
