= Kopydłowo, Konin County =

Kopydłowo
- Village
- Location within Poland
- Coordinates: 52°27′N 18°11′E
- Country: Poland
- Voivodeship: Greater Poland
- County: Konin
- Gmina: Wilczyn

Kopydłowo [kɔpɨˈdwɔvɔ] is a village in the administrative district of Gmina Wilczyn, within Konin County, Greater Poland Voivodeship, in west-central Poland.
