= Dąbrowa Biskupia =

- Village
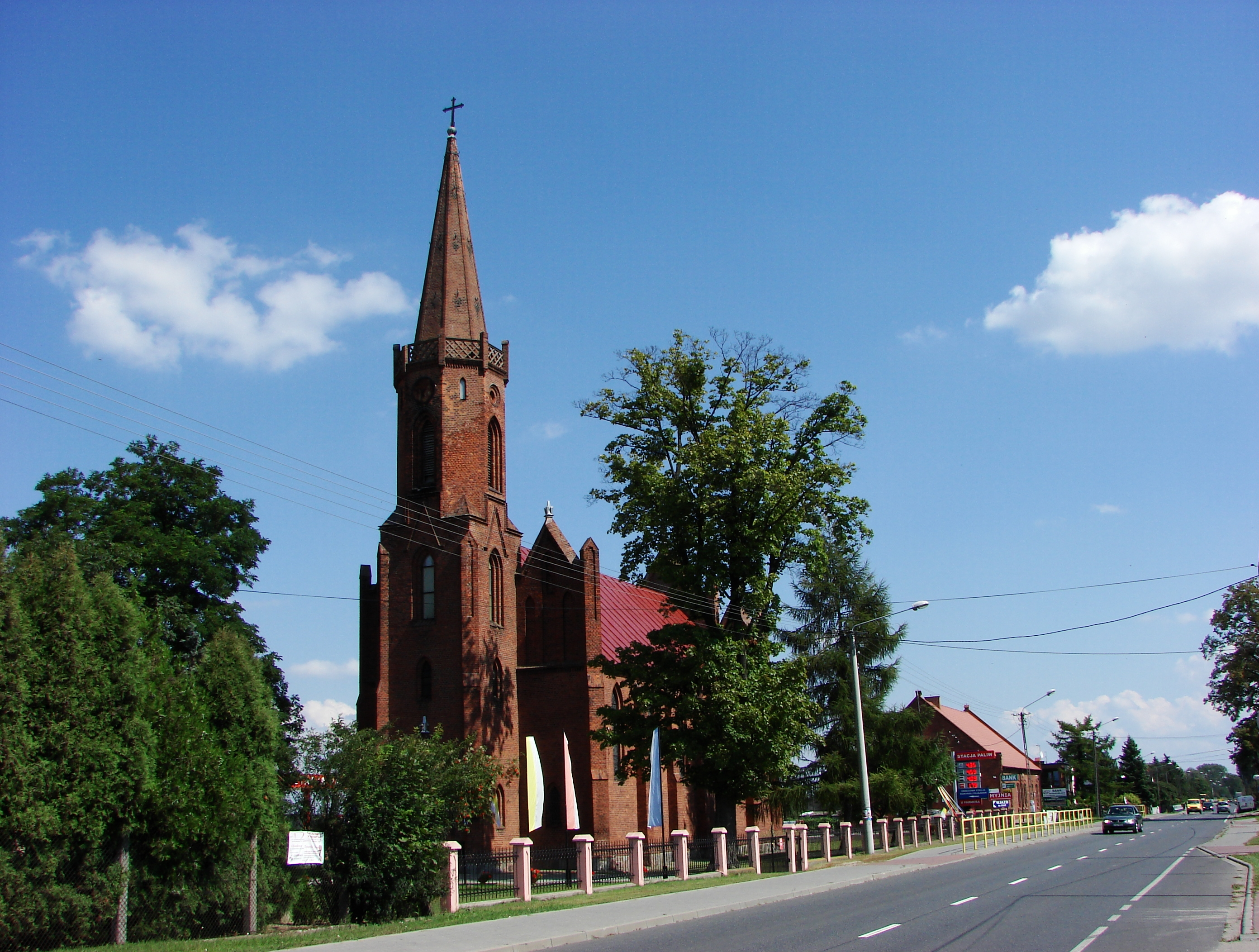
- Parish church of Virgin Mary

- Location within Poland
- Coordinates: 52°47′N 18°33′E
- Country: Poland
- Voivodeship: Kuyavian-Pomeranian
- County: Inowrocław
- Gmina: Dąbrowa Biskupia
- Time zone: UTC+1 (CET)
  - Summer (DST): UTC+2 (CEST)
- Vehicle registration: CIN

Dąbrowa Biskupia [dɔmˈbrɔva bisˈkupja] is a village in Inowrocław County, Kuyavian-Pomeranian Voivodeship, in north-central Poland. It is the seat of the gmina (administrative district) called Gmina Dąbrowa Biskupia.

Six Polish citizens were murdered by Nazi Germany in the village during World War II.
