= Braciszewo =

- Village
- Location within Poland
- Coordinates: 52°32′N 17°31′E
- Country: Poland
- Voivodeship: Greater Poland
- County: Gniezno
- Gmina: Gniezno
- Population (approx.): 150

Braciszewo [brat͡ɕiˈʂɛvɔ] is a village in the administrative district of Gmina Gniezno, within Gniezno County, Greater Poland Voivodeship, in west-central Poland.

The village has an approximate population of 150. Braciszewo is known for its picturesque surroundings and proximity to the Warta River, which flows through the region.
