= Nowa Gogolina =

- Village
- Location within Poland
- Coordinates: 52°25′43″N 18°11′57″E
- Country: Poland
- Voivodeship: Greater Poland
- County: Konin
- Gmina: Wilczyn
- Population: 190

Nowa Gogolina [ˈnɔva ɡɔɡɔˈlina] is a village in the administrative district of Gmina Wilczyn, within Konin County, Greater Poland Voivodeship, in west-central Poland.
