= Pieranie =

- Village
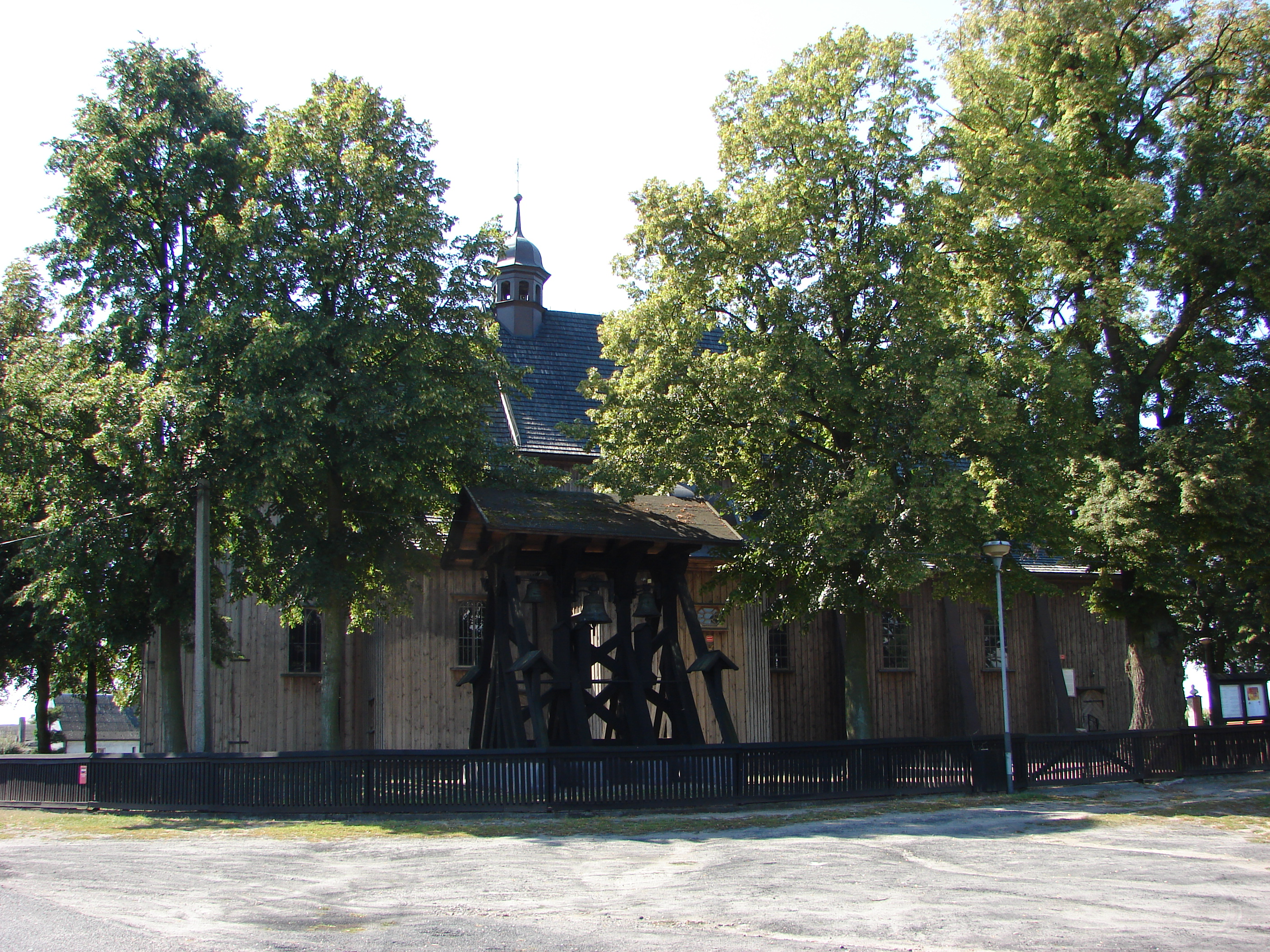
- Wooden church of Saint Nicholas, completed in 1743.

- Location within Poland
- Coordinates: 52°45′N 18°29′E
- Country: Poland
- Voivodeship: Kuyavian-Pomeranian
- County: Inowrocław
- Gmina: Dąbrowa Biskupia
- Population: 190

Pieranie [pjɛˈraɲɛ] (German: Freitagsheim) is a village in the administrative district of Gmina Dąbrowa Biskupia, within Inowrocław County, Kuyavian-Pomeranian Voivodeship, in north-central Poland.
