= Konary, Inowrocław County =

Konary
- Village
- Location within Poland
- Coordinates: 52°44′N 18°29′E
- Country: Poland
- Voivodeship: Kuyavian-Pomeranian
- County: Inowrocław
- Gmina: Dąbrowa Biskupia

Konary [kɔˈnarɨ] (German: Ostwehr) is a village in the administrative district of Gmina Dąbrowa Biskupia, within Inowrocław County, Kuyavian-Pomeranian Voivodeship, in north-central Poland.
