= Suchary, Greater Poland Voivodeship =

Suchary
- Village
- Location within Poland
- Coordinates: 52°26′32″N 18°8′56″E
- Country: Poland
- Voivodeship: Greater Poland
- County: Konin
- Gmina: Wilczyn
- Population: 40

Suchary [suˈxarɨ] is a village in the administrative district of Gmina Wilczyn, within Konin County, Greater Poland Voivodeship, in west-central Poland.
