= Nowy Świat, Konin County =

Nowy Świat
- Settlement
- Location within Poland
- Coordinates: 52°27′47″N 18°08′43″E
- Country: Poland
- Voivodeship: Greater Poland
- County: Konin
- Gmina: Wilczyn

Nowy Świat (Polish pronunciation: [ˈnɔvɨ ˈɕfjat]) is a settlement in the administrative district of Gmina Wilczyn, within Konin County, Greater Poland Voivodeship, in west-central Poland.
