= Mnichowo, Greater Poland Voivodeship =

Mnichowo
- Village
- Location within Poland
- Coordinates: 52°30′N 17°32′E
- Country: Poland
- Voivodeship: Greater Poland
- County: Gniezno
- Gmina: Gniezno
- Population (approx.): 450

Mnichowo [mɲiˈxɔvɔ] is a village in the administrative district of Gmina Gniezno, within Gniezno County, Greater Poland Voivodeship, in west-central Poland.

The village has an approximate population of 450.
