= Wola Skorzęcka =

- Village
- Location within Poland
- Coordinates: 52°31′N 17°42′E
- Country: Poland
- Voivodeship: Greater Poland
- County: Gniezno
- Gmina: Gniezno

Wola Skorzęcka [ˈvɔla skɔˈʐɛnt͡ska] is a village in the administrative district of Gmina Gniezno, within Gniezno County, Greater Poland Voivodeship, in west-central Poland.
