= Piekary, Gniezno County =

Piekary
- Village
- Location within Poland
- Coordinates: 52°32′N 17°33′E
- Country: Poland
- Voivodeship: Greater Poland
- County: Gniezno
- Gmina: Gniezno

Piekary [pʲɛˈkarɨ] is a village in the administrative district of Gmina Gniezno, within Gniezno County, Greater Poland Voivodeship, in west-central Poland.
