= Góry, Konin County =

Góry
- Village
- Location within Poland
- Coordinates: 52°25′N 18°14′E
- Country: Poland
- Voivodeship: Greater Poland
- County: Konin
- Gmina: Wilczyn

Góry [ˈɡurɨ] (German: Flammburg) is a village in the administrative district of Gmina Wilczyn, within Konin County, Greater Poland Voivodeship, in west-central Poland.
