= Modliszewo =

- Village
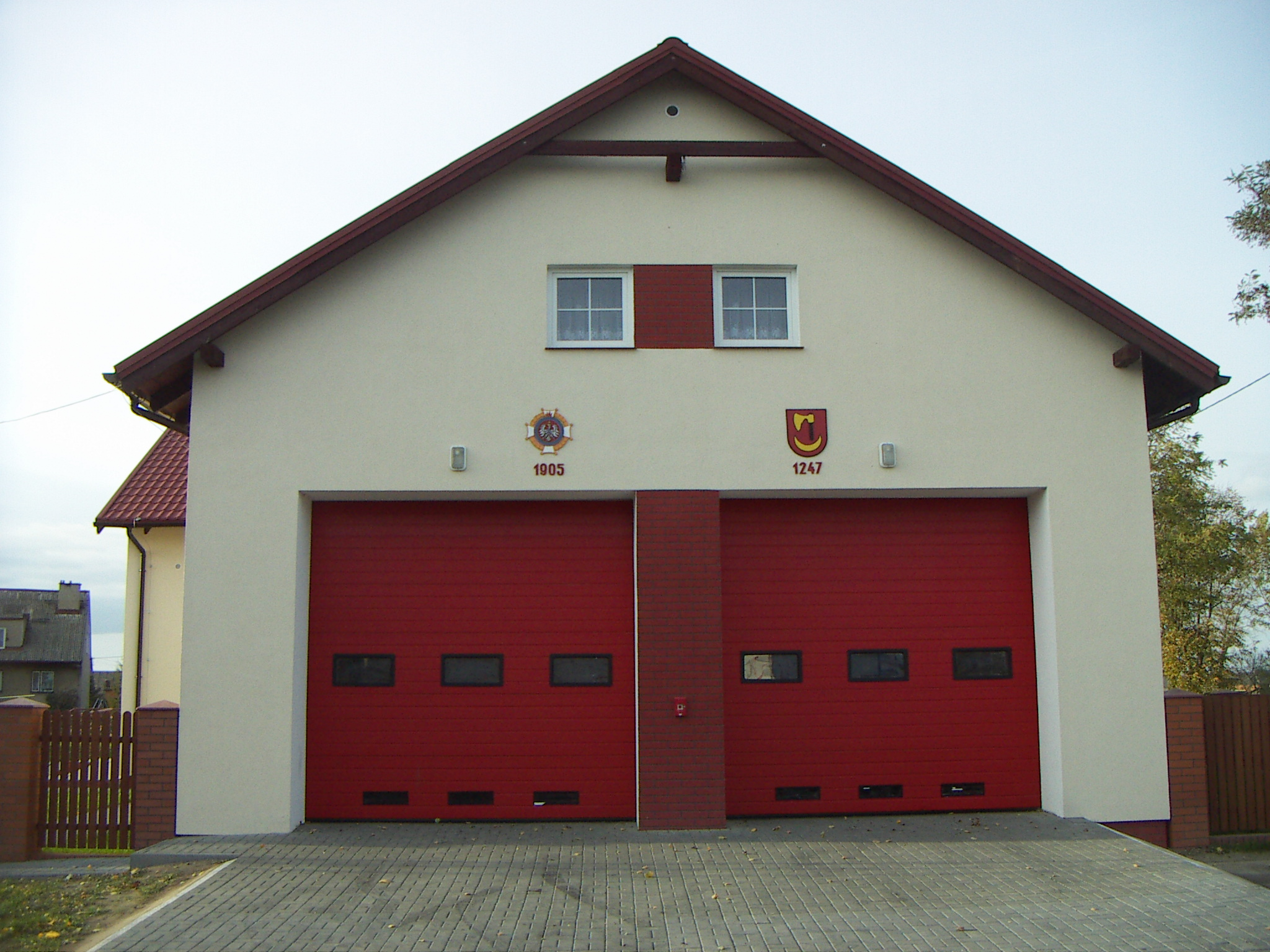
- Volunteer fire department in Modliszewo

- Location within Poland
- Coordinates: 52°36′16″N 17°35′58″E
- Country: Poland
- Voivodeship: Greater Poland
- County: Gniezno
- Gmina: Gniezno
- Time zone: UTC+1 (CET)
  - Summer (DST): UTC+2 (CEST)
- Vehicle registration: PGN

Modliszewo [mɔdlʲiˈʂɛvɔ] is a village in the administrative district of Gmina Gniezno, within Gniezno County, Greater Poland Voivodeship, in west-central Poland.

== History ==
As part of the region of Greater Poland, i.e. the cradle of the Polish state, the area formed part of Poland since its establishment in the 10th century. Modliszewo was a private village of Polish nobility, administratively located in the Gniezno County in the Kalisz Voivodeship in the Greater Poland Province of the Kingdom of Poland.

During the German occupation of Poland (World War II), in 1939, the occupiers carried out expulsions of Poles, who were then placed in a transit camp in nearby Gniezno, and afterwards deported to the General Government in the more eastern part of German-occupied Poland, while their houses and farms were handed over to German colonists as part of the Lebensraum policy.

== Transport ==
The Polish S5 highway runs nearby, east of the village.
