= Ostrówek, Gmina Wilczyn =

Ostrówek
- Settlement
- Location within Poland
- Coordinates: 52°26′09″N 18°11′39″E
- Country: Poland
- Voivodeship: Greater Poland
- County: Konin
- Gmina: Wilczyn
- Time zone: UTC+1 (CET)
  - Summer (DST): UTC+2 (CEST)

Ostrówek [ɔsˈtruvɛk] is a settlement in the administrative district of Gmina Wilczyn, within Konin County, Greater Poland Voivodeship, in central Poland.
