= Przybysław, Kuyavian-Pomeranian Voivodeship =

Przybysław
- Village
- Location within Poland
- Coordinates: 52°45′N 18°32′E
- Country: Poland
- Voivodeship: Kuyavian-Pomeranian
- County: Inowrocław
- Gmina: Dąbrowa Biskupia
- Population: 339

Przybysław [pʂɨˈbɨswaf] is a village in the administrative district of Gmina Dąbrowa Biskupia, within Inowrocław County, Kuyavian-Pomeranian Voivodeship, in north-central Poland.
