= Wełnica, Greater Poland Voivodeship =

Wełnica
- Village
- Location within Poland
- Coordinates: 52°34′N 17°39′E
- Country: Poland
- Voivodeship: Greater Poland
- County: Gniezno
- Gmina: Gniezno

Wełnica [vɛu̯ˈɲit͡sa] is a village in the administrative district of Gmina Gniezno, within Gniezno County, Greater Poland Voivodeship, in west-central Poland.
