= Nowy Dwór, Inowrocław County =

Nowy Dwór
- Village
- Location within Poland
- Coordinates: 53°09′16″N 18°13′36″E
- Country: Poland
- Voivodeship: Kuyavian-Pomeranian
- County: Inowrocław
- Gmina: Dąbrowa Biskupia

Nowy Dwór [ˈnɔvɨ ˈdvur] is a village in the administrative district of Gmina Dąbrowa Biskupia, within Inowrocław County, Kuyavian-Pomeranian Voivodeship, in north-central Poland.
