= Kownaty-Kolonia, Greater Poland Voivodeship =

Kownaty-Kolonia
- Village
- Location within Poland
- Coordinates: 52°29′37″N 18°9′38″E
- Country: Poland
- Voivodeship: Greater Poland
- County: Konin
- Gmina: Wilczyn

Kownaty-Kolonia [kɔvˈnatɨ kɔˈlɔɲa] is a village in the administrative district of Gmina Wilczyn, within Konin County, Greater Poland Voivodeship, in west-central Poland.
