= Gmina Dąbrowa Biskupia =

Gmina Dąbrowa Biskupia Dąbrowa Biskupia Commune
- Gmina
- Coat of arms
- Interactive map of Gmina Dąbrowa Biskupia
- Coordinates (Dąbrowa Biskupia): 52°47′N 18°33′E
- Country: Poland
- Voivodeship: Kuyavian-Pomeranian
- County: Inowrocław
- Seat: Dąbrowa Biskupia

Area
  - Total: 147.44 km^{2} (56.93 sq mi)

Population (2006)
  - Total: 5,190
  - Density: 35.2/km^{2} (91.2/sq mi)
- Website: https://www.dabrowabiskupia.pl/

Gmina Dąbrowa Biskupia is a rural gmina (administrative district) in Inowrocław County, Kuyavian-Pomeranian Voivodeship, in north-central Poland. Its seat is the village of Dąbrowa Biskupia, which lies approximately 20 kilometres (12 mi) east of Inowrocław and 29 km (18 mi) south of Toruń.

The gmina covers an area of 147.44 square kilometres (56.9 sq mi), and as of 2006 its total population was 5,190.

== Villages ==
Gmina Dąbrowa Biskupia contains the villages and settlements of Brudnia, Chlewiska, Chróstowo, Dąbrowa Biskupia, Dziewa, Konary, Mleczkowo, Modliborzyce, Nowy Dwór, Ośniszczewko, Ośniszczewo, Parchanie, Parchanki, Pieczyska, Pieranie, Przybysław, Radojewice, Stanomin, Walentynowo, Wola Stanomińska, Wonorze and Zagajewice.

== Neighbouring gminas ==
Gmina Dąbrowa Biskupia is bordered by the gminas of Aleksandrów Kujawski, Dobre, Gniewkowo, Inowrocław, Koneck, Kruszwica and Zakrzewo.
