= Kownaty, Greater Poland Voivodeship =

Kownaty
- Village
- Location within Poland
- Coordinates: 52°30′N 18°10′E
- Country: Poland
- Voivodeship: Greater Poland
- County: Konin
- Gmina: Wilczyn

Kownaty [kɔvˈnatɨ] is a village in the administrative district of Gmina Wilczyn, within Konin County, Greater Poland Voivodeship, in west-central Poland.
