= Kaliska, Konin County =

Kaliska
- Village
- Location within Poland
- Coordinates: 52°25′N 18°11′E
- Country: Poland
- Voivodeship: Greater Poland
- County: Konin
- Gmina: Wilczyn

Kaliska [kaˈliska] is a village in the administrative district of Gmina Wilczyn, within Konin County, Greater Poland Voivodeship, in west-central Poland.
