= Maślaki =

- Village
- Location within Poland
- Coordinates: 52°26′N 18°8′E
- Country: Poland
- Voivodeship: Greater Poland
- County: Konin
- Gmina: Wilczyn
- Population: 80

Maślaki [maˈɕlaki] is a village in the administrative district of Gmina Wilczyn, within Konin County, Greater Poland Voivodeship, in west-central Poland.
