= Walentynowo, Kuyavian-Pomeranian Voivodeship =

Walentynowo
- Village
- Location within Poland
- Coordinates: 52°46′07″N 18°35′58″E
- Country: Poland
- Voivodeship: Kuyavian-Pomeranian
- County: Inowrocław
- Gmina: Dąbrowa Biskupia

Walentynowo (German 1939-1945 Dreilinden) [valɛntɨˈnɔvɔ] is a village in the administrative district of Gmina Łobżenica, within Bydgoszcz County, Kuyavian-Pomeranian Voivodeship, in north-central Poland.
