= Krzyszczewo =

Village in Greater Poland Voivodeship, Poland

- Village
- Location within Poland
- Coordinates: 52°35′N 17°35′E
- Country: Poland
- Voivodeship: Greater Poland
- County: Gniezno
- Gmina: Gniezno

Krzyszczewo [kʂɨʂˈt͡ʂɛvɔ] is a village in the administrative district of Gmina Gniezno, within Gniezno County, Greater Poland Voivodeship, in west-central Poland.
