= Dziewa =

- Village
- Location within Poland
- Coordinates: 52°43′00″N 18°27′00″E
- Country: Poland
- Voivodeship: Kuyavian-Pomeranian
- County: Inowrocław
- Gmina: Dąbrowa Biskupia

Dziewa [ˈd͡ʑɛva] is a village in the administrative district of Gmina Dąbrowa Biskupia, within Inowrocław County, Kuyavian-Pomeranian Voivodeship, in north-central Poland.
