= Dębówiec-Towarzystwo =

- Village
- Location within Poland
- Coordinates: 52°27′01″N 18°07′41″E
- Country: Poland
- Voivodeship: Greater Poland
- County: Konin
- Gmina: Wilczyn

Dębówiec-Towarzystwo [dɛmˈbuvjɛt͡s tɔvaˈʐɨstfɔ] is a village in the administrative district of Gmina Wilczyn, within Konin County, Greater Poland Voivodeship, in west-central Poland.
