= Jankowo Dolne =

- Village
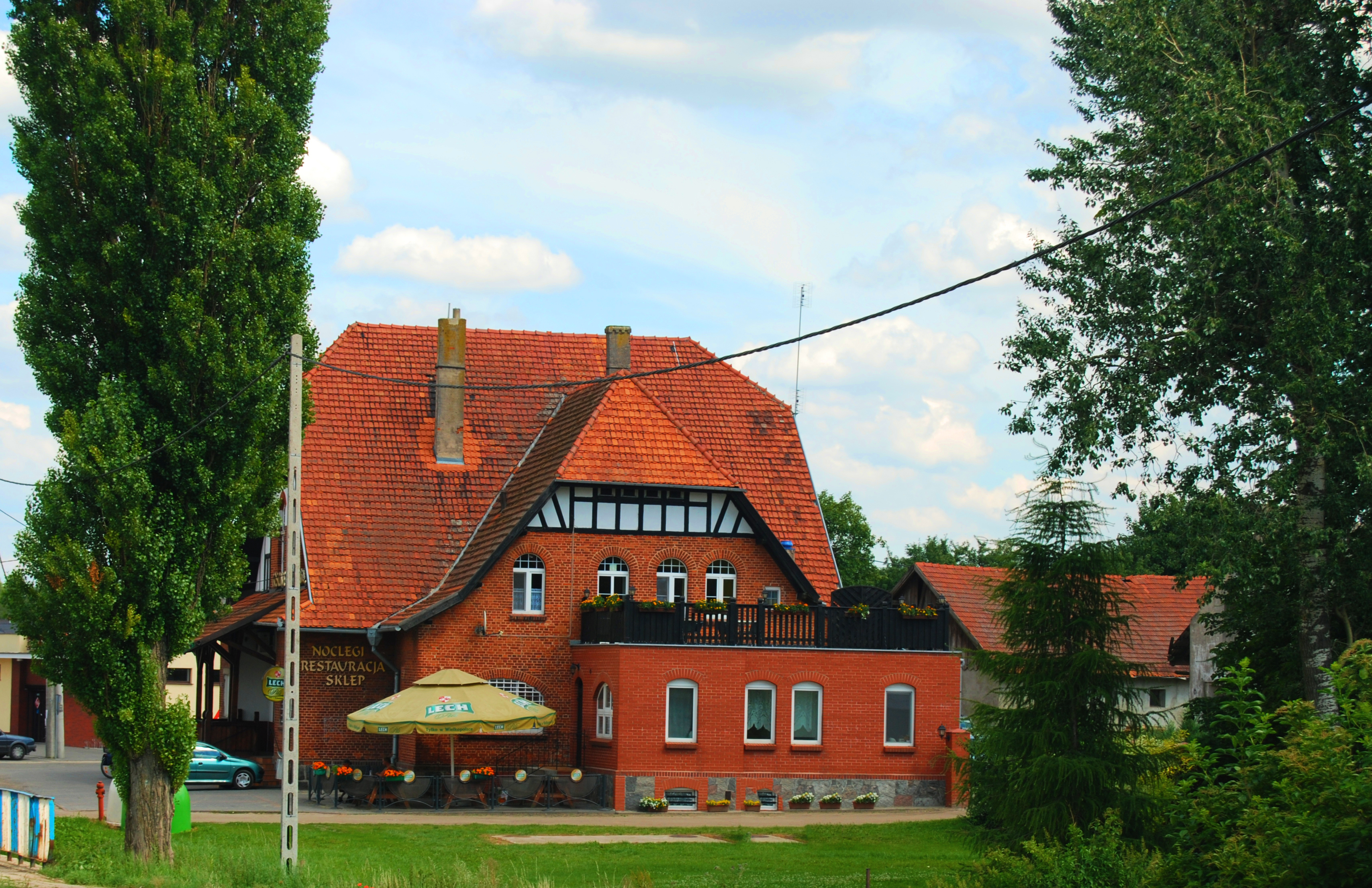
- Old inn in Jankowo Dolne

- Location within Poland
- Coordinates: 52°33′N 17°42′E
- Country: Poland
- Voivodeship: Greater Poland
- County: Gniezno
- Gmina: Gniezno

Population (2006)
  - Total: 530
- Time zone: UTC+1 (CET)
  - Summer (DST): UTC+2 (CEST)
- Area code: (+48) 61
- Vehicle registration: PGN

Jankowo Dolne [janˈkɔvɔ ˈdɔlnɛ] is a village in the administrative district of Gmina Gniezno, within Gniezno County, Greater Poland Voivodeship, in west-central Poland.

It is situated on the Wełna River and the western shore of Jankowskie Lake

== History ==
As part of the region of Greater Poland, i.e. the cradle of the Polish state, the area formed part of Poland since its establishment in the 10th century. Jankowo Dolne was a private village of Polish nobility, administratively located in the Gniezno County in the Kalisz Voivodeship in the Greater Poland Province of the Kingdom of Poland.

During the German invasion of Poland which started World War II, on September 11, 1939, German troops carried out a massacre of 12 Poles, including women and children (see Nazi crimes against the Polish nation).
