= Obora, Greater Poland Voivodeship =

Obora
- Village
- Location within Poland
- Coordinates: 52°34′N 17°32′E
- Country: Poland
- Voivodeship: Greater Poland
- County: Gniezno
- Gmina: Gniezno
- Time zone: UTC+1 (CET)
  - Summer (DST): UTC+2 (CEST)
- Vehicle registration: PGN

Obora [ɔˈbɔra] is a village in the administrative district of Gmina Gniezno, within Gniezno County, Greater Poland Voivodeship, in west-central Poland.

== History ==
As part of the region of Greater Poland, i.e. the cradle of the Polish state, the area formed part of Poland since its establishment in the 10th century. Obora was a private church village, administratively located in the Gniezno County in the Kalisz Voivodeship in the Greater Poland Province of the Kingdom of Poland.

On September 11, 1939, during the German invasion of Poland which started World War II, German troops carried out a massacre of 22 Poles from the region, incl. from Obora itself, in the village (see Nazi crimes against the Polish nation). During the subsequent German occupation, in 1939, the occupiers carried out expulsions of Poles, who were then placed in a transit camp in nearby Gniezno, and afterwards deported to the General Government in the more eastern part of German-occupied Poland, while their houses and farms were handed over to German colonists as part of the Lebensraum policy.
