= Kopydłówek =

- Settlement
- Location within Poland
- Coordinates: 52°26′36″N 18°11′00″E
- Country: Poland
- Voivodeship: Greater Poland
- County: Konin
- Gmina: Wilczyn

Kopydłówek [kɔpɨˈdwuvɛk] is a settlement in the administrative district of Gmina Wilczyn, within Konin County, Greater Poland Voivodeship, in west-central Poland.
