= Napoleonowo =

- Village
- Location within Poland
- Coordinates: 52°36′01″N 17°34′57″E
- Country: Poland
- Voivodeship: Greater Poland
- County: Gniezno
- Gmina: Gniezno

Napoleonowo [napɔlɛɔˈnɔvɔ] is a village in the administrative district of Gmina Gniezno, within Gniezno County, Greater Poland Voivodeship, in west-central Poland.
