= Gmina Gniezno =

Gmina Gniezno Gniezno Commune
- Gmina
- Flag Coat of arms
- Interactive map of Gmina Gniezno
- Coordinates (Gniezno): 52°32′N 17°36′E
- Country: Poland
- Voivodeship: Greater Poland
- County: Gniezno
- Seat: Gniezno

Area
  - Total: 177.99 km^{2} (68.72 sq mi)

Population (2014)
  - Total: 10,584
  - Density: 59.464/km^{2} (154.01/sq mi)
- Website: http://www.urzadgminy.gniezno.pl/

Gmina Gniezno is a rural gmina (administrative district) in Gniezno County, Greater Poland Voivodeship, in west-central Poland. Its seat is the town of Gniezno, although the town is not part of the territory of the gmina.

The gmina covers an area of 177.99 square kilometres (68.7 sq mi), and as of 2006 its total population is 8,343.

== Villages ==
Gmina Gniezno contains the villages and settlements of Braciszewo, Dalki, Dębówiec, Ganina, Goślinowo, Jankowo Dolne, Kalina, Krzyszczewo, Łabiszynek, Lubochnia, Lulkowo, Mączniki, Mnichowo, Modliszewko, Modliszewo, Napoleonowo, Obora, Obórka, Osiniec, Piekary, Pyszczyn, Pyszczynek, Skiereszewo, Strzyżewo Kościelne, Strzyżewo Paczkowe, Strzyżewo Smykowe, Szczytniki Duchowne, Wełnica, Wierzbiczany, Wola Skorzęcka and Zdziechowa.

== Neighbouring gminas ==
Gmina Gniezno is bordered by the town of Gniezno and by the gminas of Czerniejewo, Kłecko, Łubowo, Mieleszyn, Niechanowo, Rogowo, Trzemeszno and Witkowo.
