= Białężyn, Poznań County =

Białężyn
- Village
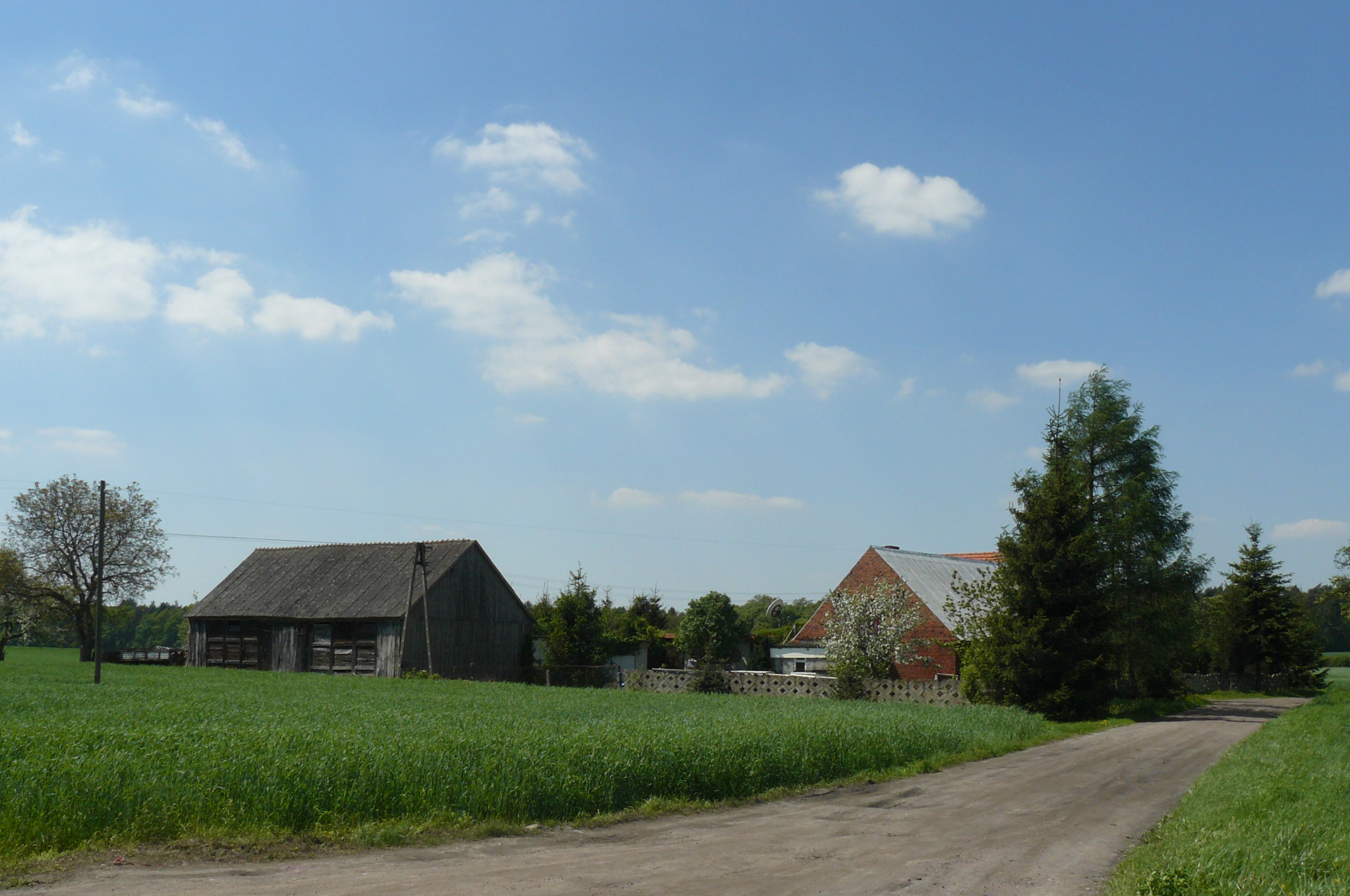
- Białężyn

- Location within Poland
- Coordinates: 52°38′N 16°59′E
- Country: Poland
- Voivodeship: Greater Poland
- County: Poznań
- Gmina: Murowana Goślina
- Population: 240

Białężyn [bjaˈwɛ̃ʐɨn] is a village in the administrative district of Gmina Murowana Goślina, within Poznań County, Greater Poland Voivodeship, in west-central Poland.

The village has a church whose history goes back to 1725, when the demolished church of Słomowo was re-erected in Białężyn.
