= Chróstowo =

- Village
- Location within Poland
- Coordinates: 52°45′56″N 18°34′12″E
- Country: Poland
- Voivodeship: Kuyavian-Pomeranian
- County: Inowrocław
- Gmina: Dąbrowa Biskupia
- Time zone: UTC+1 (CET)
  - Summer (DST): UTC+2 (CEST)
- Vehicle registration: CIN

Chróstowo (German 1939-1945 Reisicht) [xrusˈtɔvɔ] is a village in the administrative district of Gmina Dąbrowa Biskupia, within Inowrocław County, Kuyavian-Pomeranian Voivodeship, in north-central Poland.

== History ==
During the German occupation of Poland (World War II), Chróstowo was one of the sites of executions of Poles, carried out by the Germans in 1939 as part of the Intelligenzaktion.
