= Pieczyska, Inowrocław County =

Pieczyska
- Village
- Location within Poland
- Coordinates: 52°45′03″N 18°25′54″E
- Country: Poland
- Voivodeship: Kuyavian-Pomeranian
- County: Inowrocław
- Gmina: Dąbrowa Biskupia

Pieczyska [pjɛˈt͡ʂɨska] is a village in the administrative district of Gmina Dąbrowa Biskupia, within Inowrocław County, Kuyavian-Pomeranian Voivodeship, in north-central Poland.
