= Dębówiec, Konin County =

Dębówiec
- Village
- Location within Poland
- Coordinates: 52°27′40″N 18°08′07″E
- Country: Poland
- Voivodeship: Greater Poland
- County: Konin
- Gmina: Wilczyn

Dębówiec [dɛmˈbuvjɛt͡s] is a village in the administrative district of Gmina Wilczyn, within Konin County, Greater Poland Voivodeship, in west-central Poland.
