= Kościeszki, Greater Poland Voivodeship =

Kościeszki
- Village
- Location within Poland
- Coordinates: 52°28′38″N 18°14′16″E
- Country: Poland
- Voivodeship: Greater Poland
- County: Konin
- Gmina: Wilczyn

Kościeszki [kɔɕˈt͡ɕɛʂki] is a village in the administrative district of Gmina Wilczyn, within Konin County, Greater Poland Voivodeship, in west-central Poland.
