= Modliborzyce, Kuyavian-Pomeranian Voivodeship =

Modliborzyce
- Village
- Location within Poland
- Coordinates: 52°48′N 18°27′E
- Country: Poland
- Voivodeship: Kuyavian-Pomeranian
- County: Inowrocław
- Gmina: Dąbrowa Biskupia
- Time zone: UTC+1 (CET)
  - Summer (DST): UTC+2 (CEST)
- Vehicle registration: CIN

Modliborzyce [mɔdlibɔˈʐɨt͡sɛ] (German: Deutschwalde) is a village in the administrative district of Gmina Dąbrowa Biskupia, within Inowrocław County, Kuyavian-Pomeranian Voivodeship, in north-central Poland.

During the German occupation of Poland (World War II), in 1940, the occupiers carried out expulsions of Poles, who were deported to the Lublin District of the General Government (German-occupied central Poland), while their farms were handed over to German colonists as part of the Lebensraum policy.
