= Cychry, Masovian Voivodeship =

Cychry
- Village
- Location within Poland
- Coordinates: 51°53′27″N 20°39′2″E
- Country: Poland
- Voivodeship: Masovian
- County: Grójec
- Gmina: Pniewy
- Elevation: 176 m (577 ft)
- Population: 80

Cychry [ˈt͡sɨxrɨ] is a village in the administrative district of Gmina Pniewy, within Grójec County, Masovian Voivodeship, in east-central Poland.
