= Brześce, Masovian Voivodeship =

Brześce
- Village
- Location within Poland
- Coordinates: 52°1′N 21°11′E
- Country: Poland
- Voivodeship: Masovian
- County: Piaseczno
- Gmina: Góra Kalwaria
- Population: 850

Brześce [ˈbʐɛɕt͡sɛ] is a village in the administrative district of Gmina Góra Kalwaria, within Piaseczno County, Masovian Voivodeship, in east-central Poland.
