= Jerzyków =

- Village
- Location within Poland
- Coordinates: 51°02′24″N 16°05′55″E
- Country: Poland
- Voivodeship: Lower Silesian
- Powiat: Jawor
- Gmina: Męcinka

Jerzyków [jɛˈʐɨkuf] is a village in the administrative district of Gmina Męcinka, within Jawor County, Lower Silesian Voivodeship, in south-western Poland.
