= Dębówiec, Gniezno County =

Dębówiec
- Village
- Location within Poland
- Coordinates: 52°35′48″N 17°39′40″E
- Country: Poland
- Voivodeship: Greater Poland
- County: Gniezno
- Gmina: Gniezno

Dębówiec [dɛmˈbuvʲɛt͡s] is a village in the administrative district of Gmina Gniezno, within Gniezno County, Greater Poland Voivodeship, in west-central Poland.
