= Ługowa Wola =

Village in Gmina Policzna, Poland

- Village
- Location within Poland
- Coordinates: 51°25′34″N 21°39′51″E
- Country: Poland
- Voivodeship: Masovian
- County: Zwoleń
- Gmina: Policzna

Ługowa Wola [wuˈɡɔva ˈvɔla] is a village in the administrative district of Gmina Policzna, within Zwoleń County, Masovian Voivodeship, in east-central Poland.
