= Wola Stanomińska =

- Village
- Location within Poland
- Coordinates: 52°48′28″N 18°32′14″E
- Country: Poland
- Voivodeship: Kuyavian-Pomeranian
- County: Inowrocław
- Gmina: Dąbrowa Biskupia

Wola Stanomińska [ˈvɔla stanɔˈmiɲska] is a village in the administrative district of Gmina Dąbrowa Biskupia, within Inowrocław County, Kuyavian-Pomeranian Voivodeship, in north-central Poland.
