= Łabiszynek =

- Village
- Location within Poland
- Coordinates: 52°35′18″N 17°34′4″E
- Country: Poland
- Voivodeship: Greater Poland
- County: Gniezno
- Gmina: Gniezno
- Population: 590

Łabiszynek [wabʲiˈʂɨnɛk] is a village in the administrative district of Gmina Gniezno, within Gniezno County, Greater Poland Voivodeship, in west-central Poland.
