= Pyszczyn, Greater Poland Voivodeship =

Pyszczyn
- Village
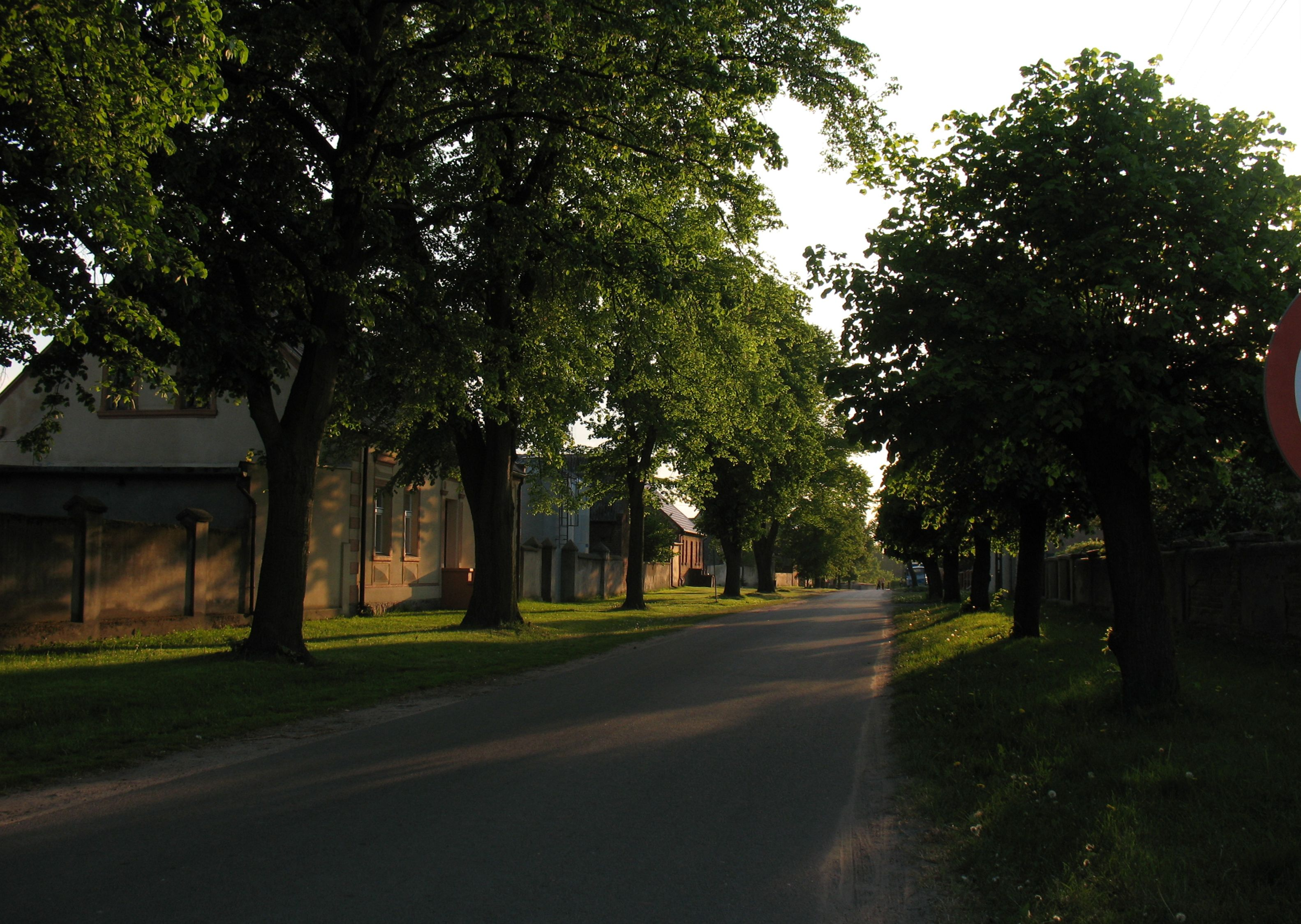

- Location within Poland
- Coordinates: 52°34′N 17°36′E
- Country: Poland
- Voivodeship: Greater Poland
- County: Gniezno
- Gmina: Gniezno
- Time zone: UTC+1 (CET)
  - Summer (DST): UTC+2 (CEST)
- Vehicle registration: PGN

Pyszczyn [ˈpɨʂt͡ʂɨn] is a village in the administrative district of Gmina Gniezno, within Gniezno County, Greater Poland Voivodeship, in west-central Poland. It is located on the eastern shore of Lake Pyszczynek.

== History ==
As part of the region of Greater Poland, i.e. the cradle of the Polish state, the area formed part of Poland since its establishment in the 10th century. The village was mentioned in the Bull of Gniezno from 1136. Pyszczyn was a private church village, administratively located in the Gniezno County in the Kalisz Voivodeship in the Greater Poland Province of the Kingdom of Poland.

During the German occupation of Poland (World War II), in 1939, the occupiers carried out expulsions of Poles, who were then placed in a transit camp in nearby Gniezno, and afterwards deported to the General Government in the more eastern part of German-occupied Poland, while their houses and farms were handed over to German colonists as part of the Lebensraum policy.

== Transport ==
The Polish S5 highway runs nearby, north of the village.
