= Mrówki, Greater Poland Voivodeship =

Mrówki
- Village
- Location within Poland
- Coordinates: 52°29′57″N 18°8′3″E
- Country: Poland
- Voivodeship: Greater Poland
- County: Konin
- Gmina: Wilczyn

Mrówki [ˈmrufki] is a village in the administrative district of Gmina Wilczyn, within Konin County, Greater Poland Voivodeship, in west-central Poland.
