= Antoni Baranowski (general) =

Polish general

- Ostoja Coat of Arms
- Born: 1760; Indykow, Poland
- Died: after 1821
- Relatives: Clan of Ostoja
- Military career
- Allegiance: Polish–Lithuanian Commonwealth
- Branch: Royal Army of the Polish–Lithuanian Commonwealth
- Service years: 1780–1812
- Rank: General Major
- Commands: Head of Division during the Kościuszko Uprising
- Conflicts: Kościuszko Uprising, Battle of Maciejowice
- Awards: Promotion to General by Tadeusz Kościuszko

Antoni Baranowski of Clan Ostoja (1760-after 1821), general major of the royal army, patriot.

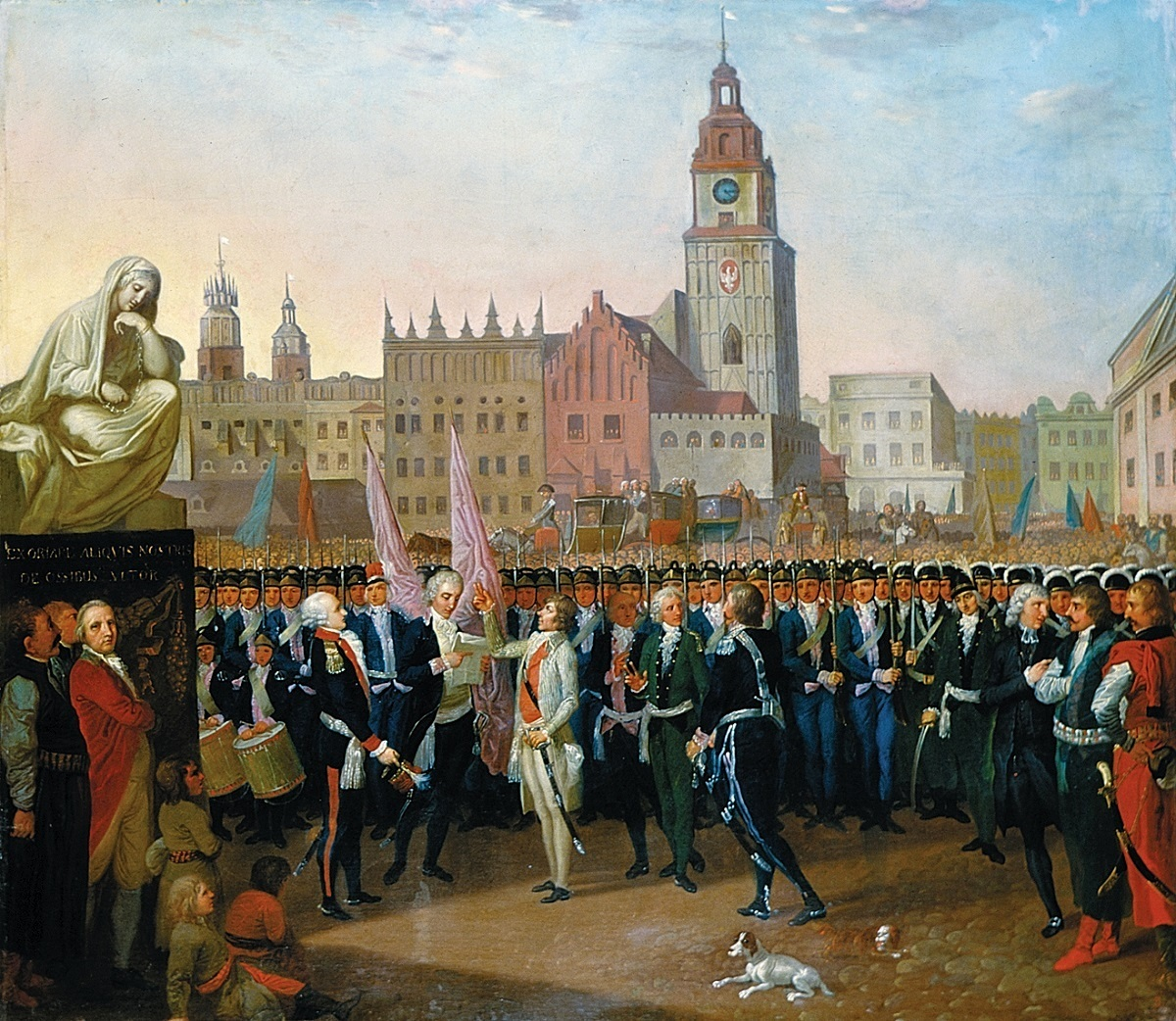
Tadeusz Kościuszko taking the oath, 1794

Baranowski was born 1760 in Indykow and origin from old Polish noble family that was part of the Clan of Ostoja. He studied from 1772 in the Corps of Cadets in Warsaw, from 1780 in the 5th Front Rifle Regiment and in 1788 he became Captain in the same regiment. From 1790 mayor in the Military Commissariat.

He remained in this function during the rule of Targowica being on duty as a liner. In Lublin he joined the Kościuszko Uprising as one of the first reported adherence to the uprising of 1794. Awarded by the Tadeusz Kościuszko with the promotion to the rank of general, he commanded the Division (incomplete), protecting the line of the Vistula-Wieprz rivers, which then was incorporated into the Corps of prince Adam Poniński (d. 1816).

Baranowski participated as the head of the division in the Battle of Maciejowice. Subsequently, remained off-duty, in 1812 he organized levée en masse in Lublin and Siedlce. From 1821 active in the Masonic movement (Freemasonry).

== See also ==
- Ostoja coat of arms
- Clan of Ostoja
