= Gmina Wilczyn =

Gmina Wilczyn Wilczyn Commune
- Gmina
- Flag Coat of arms

- Coordinates (Wilczyn): 52°29′19″N 18°9′43″E
- Country: Poland
- Voivodeship: Greater Poland
- County: Konin County
- Seat: Wilczyn

Area
  - Total: 83.12 km^{2} (32.09 sq mi)

Population (2006)
  - Total: 6,422
  - Density: 77.26/km^{2} (200.1/sq mi)
- Website: http://www.wilczyn.bazagmin.pl/

Gmina Wilczyn is a rural gmina (administrative district) in Konin County, Greater Poland Voivodeship, in west-central Poland. Its seat is the village of Wilczyn, which lies approximately 31 kilometres (19 mi) north of Konin and 86 km (53 mi) east of the regional capital Poznań.

The gmina covers an area of 83.12 square kilometres (32.1 sq mi), and as of 2006 its total population is 6,422.

== Villages ==
Gmina Wilczyn contains the villages and settlements of Biela, Cegielnia, Dębówiec, Dębówiec-Towarzystwo, Głęboczek, Gogolina, Góry, Kaliska, Kopydłówek, Kopydłowo, Kościeszki, Kownaty, Kownaty-Kolonia, Maślaki, Mrówki, Nowa Gogolina, Nowy Świat, Ościsłowo, Ostrówek, Suchary, Świętne, Wacławowo, Wilczogóra, Wilczyn, Wiśniewa, Wturek, Wygorzele and Zygmuntowo.

== Neighbouring gminas ==
Gmina Wilczyn is bordered by the gminas of Jeziora Wielkie, Kleczew, Orchowo, Skulsk, Ślesin and Strzelno.
