= Chlewiska, Siedlce County =

Chlewiska
- Village
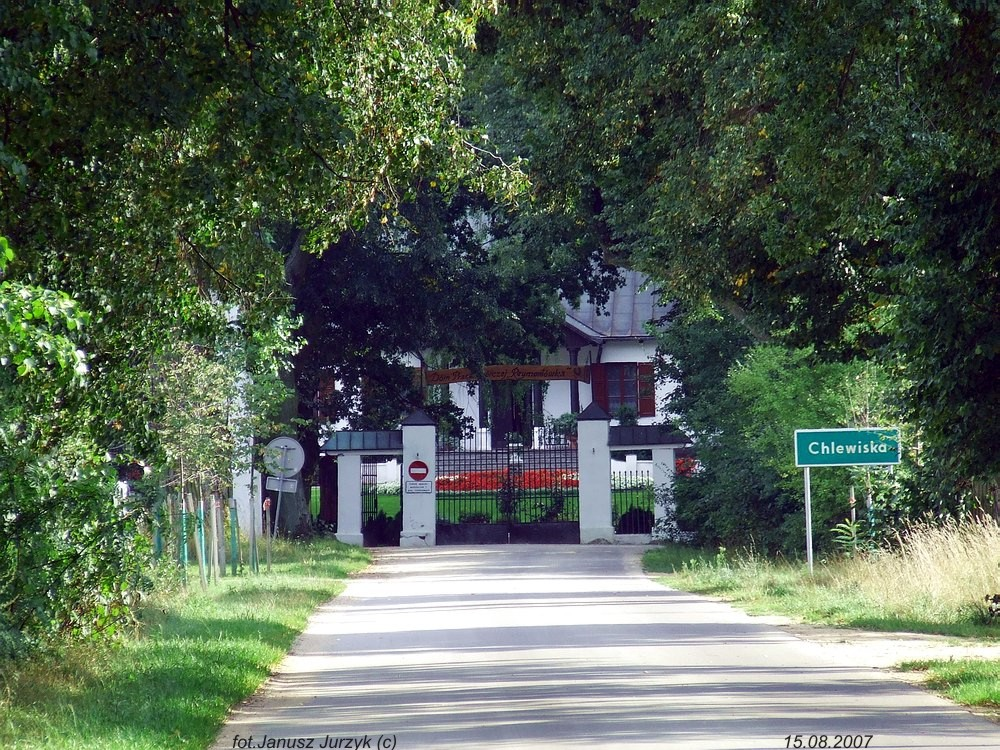

- Location within Poland
- Coordinates: 52°13′26″N 22°03′55″E
- Country: Poland
- Voivodeship: Masovian
- County: Siedlce
- Gmina: Kotuń

Chlewiska [xlɛˈvivska] is a village in the administrative district of Gmina Kotuń, within Siedlce County, Masovian Voivodeship, in east-central Poland.
