= Wilczyn, Greater Poland Voivodeship =

Wilczyn
- Village
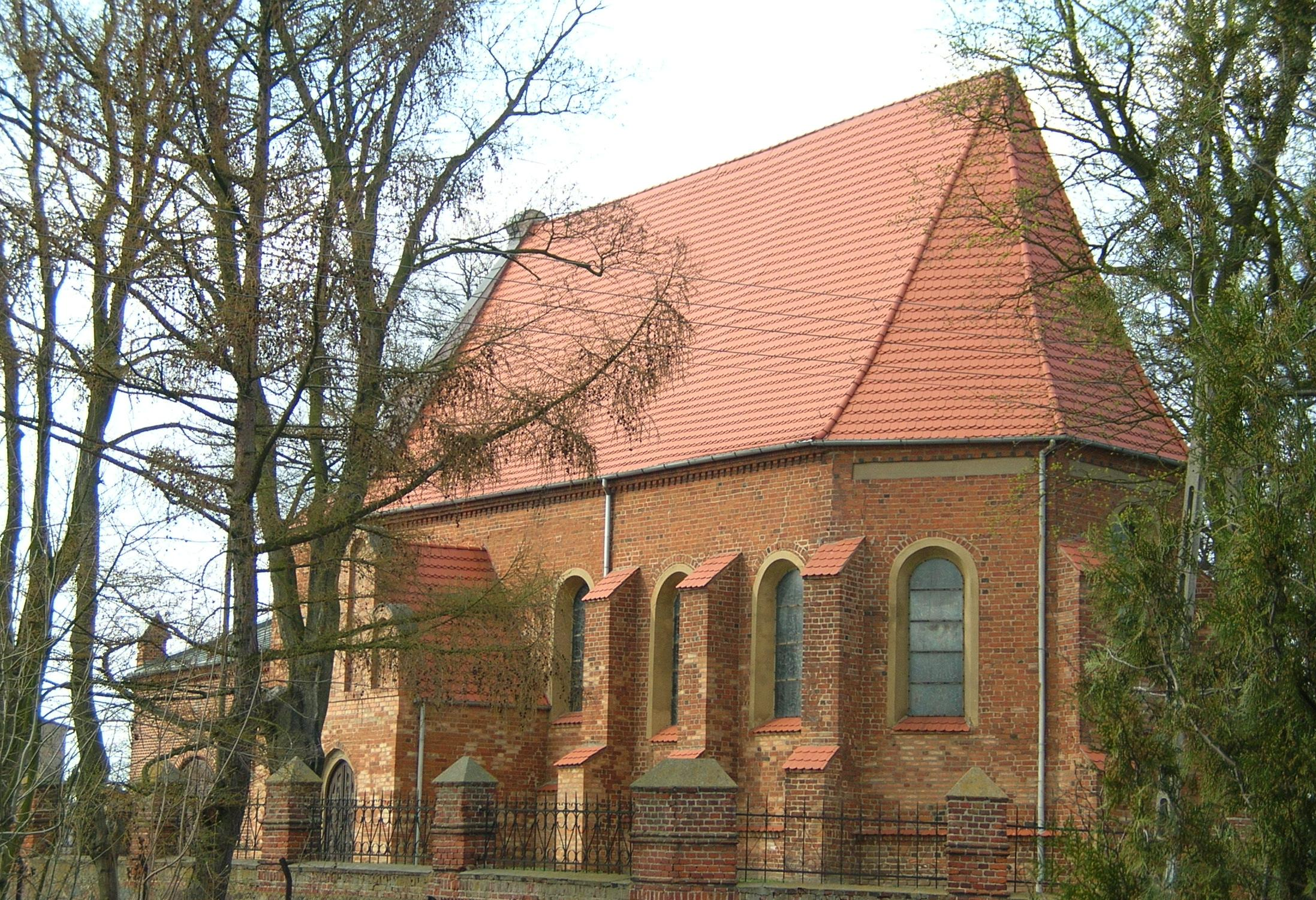
- Church of Saint Urszula. Was built in 1566.

- Location within Poland
- Coordinates: 52°29′19″N 18°9′43″E
- Country: Poland
- Voivodeship: Greater Poland
- County: Konin
- Gmina: Wilczyn
- Population: 1,200

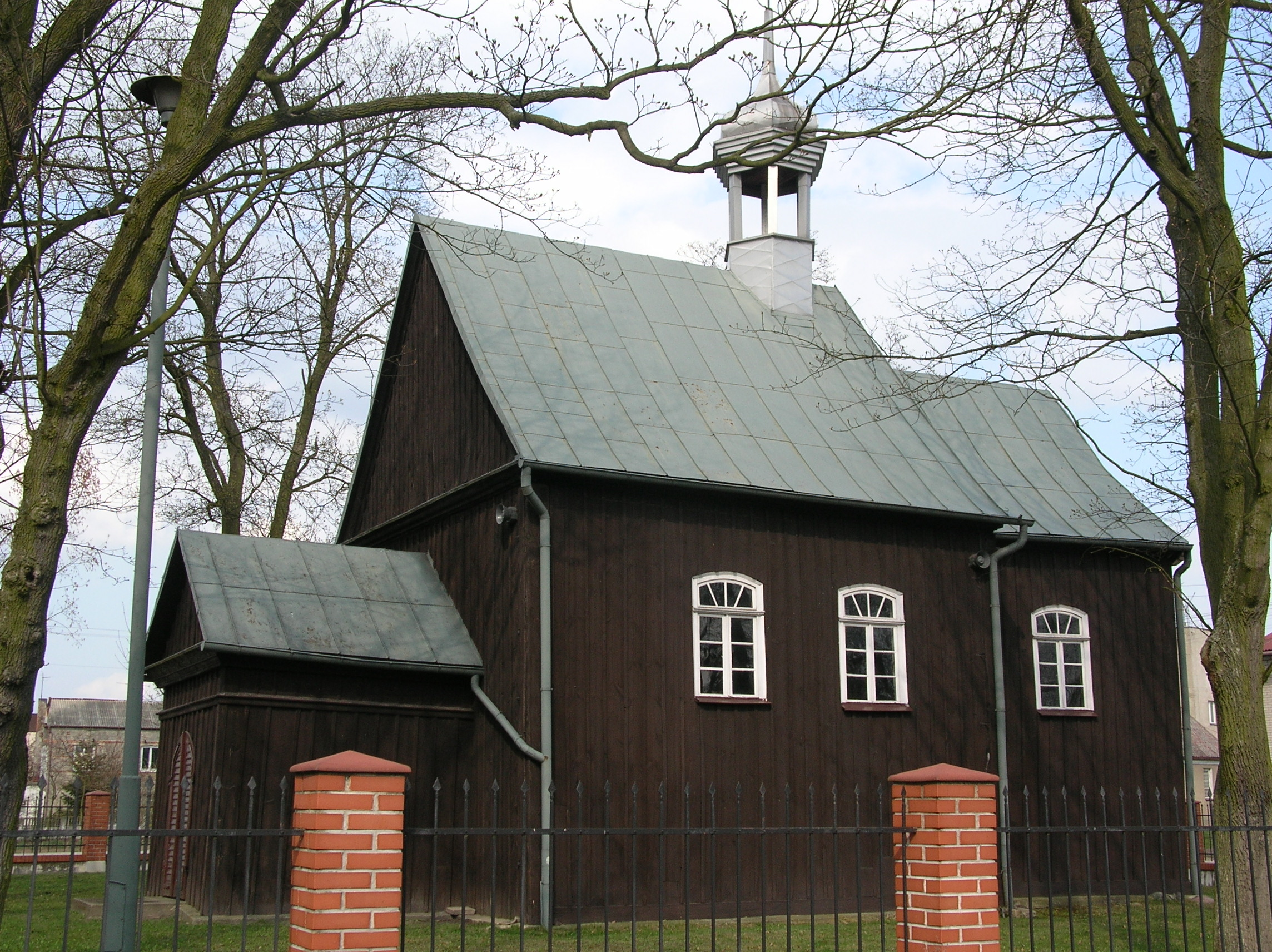
Wooden church from 1781, dedicated to St Thecla.

Wilczyn [ˈvilt͡ʂɨn] is a village in Konin County, Greater Poland Voivodeship, in west-central Poland. It is the seat of the gmina (administrative district) called Gmina Wilczyn.
