= Psarskie, Szamotuły County =

Psarskie
- Village
- Location within Poland
- Coordinates: 52°34′45″N 16°19′11″E
- Country: Poland
- Voivodeship: Greater Poland
- County: Szamotuły
- Gmina: Pniewy
- Elevation: 82 m (269 ft)
- Population: 298

Psarskie [ˈpsarskʲɛ] is a village in the administrative district of Gmina Pniewy, within Szamotuły County, Greater Poland Voivodeship, in west-central Poland.
