= Jerzykowo, Poznań County =

Jerzykowo
- Village
- Location within Poland
- Coordinates: 52°29′N 17°11′E
- Country: Poland
- Voivodeship: Greater Poland
- County: Poznań
- Gmina: Pobiedziska

Jerzykowo ([jɛʐɨˈkɔvɔ]; German: Jentkental) is a village in the administrative district of Gmina Pobiedziska, within Poznań County, Greater Poland Voivodeship, in west-central Poland.
