= Kowalskie, Greater Poland Voivodeship =

Kowalskie
- Village
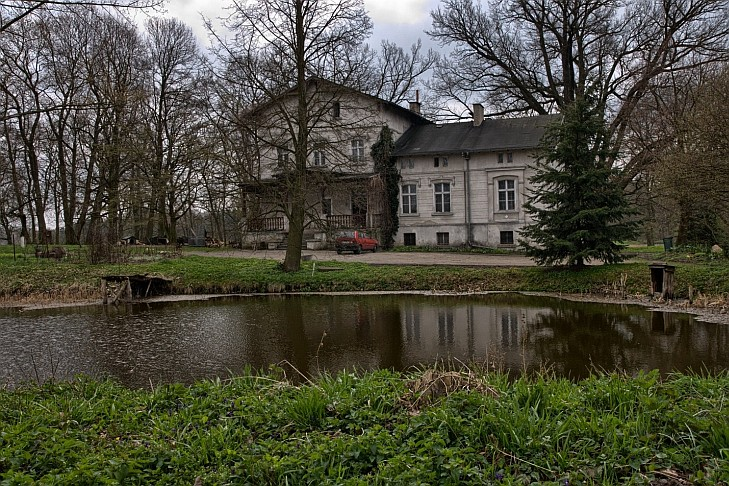
- Manor in Kowalskie

- Location within Poland
- Coordinates: 52°29′02″N 17°09′10″E
- Country: Poland
- Voivodeship: Greater Poland
- County: Poznań
- Gmina: Pobiedziska

Kowalskie ([kɔˈvalskʲɛ]; German: Eichenhof) is a village in the administrative district of Gmina Pobiedziska, within Poznań County, Greater Poland Voivodeship, in west-central Poland.
