= Gortatowo, Greater Poland Voivodeship =

Gortatowo
- Village
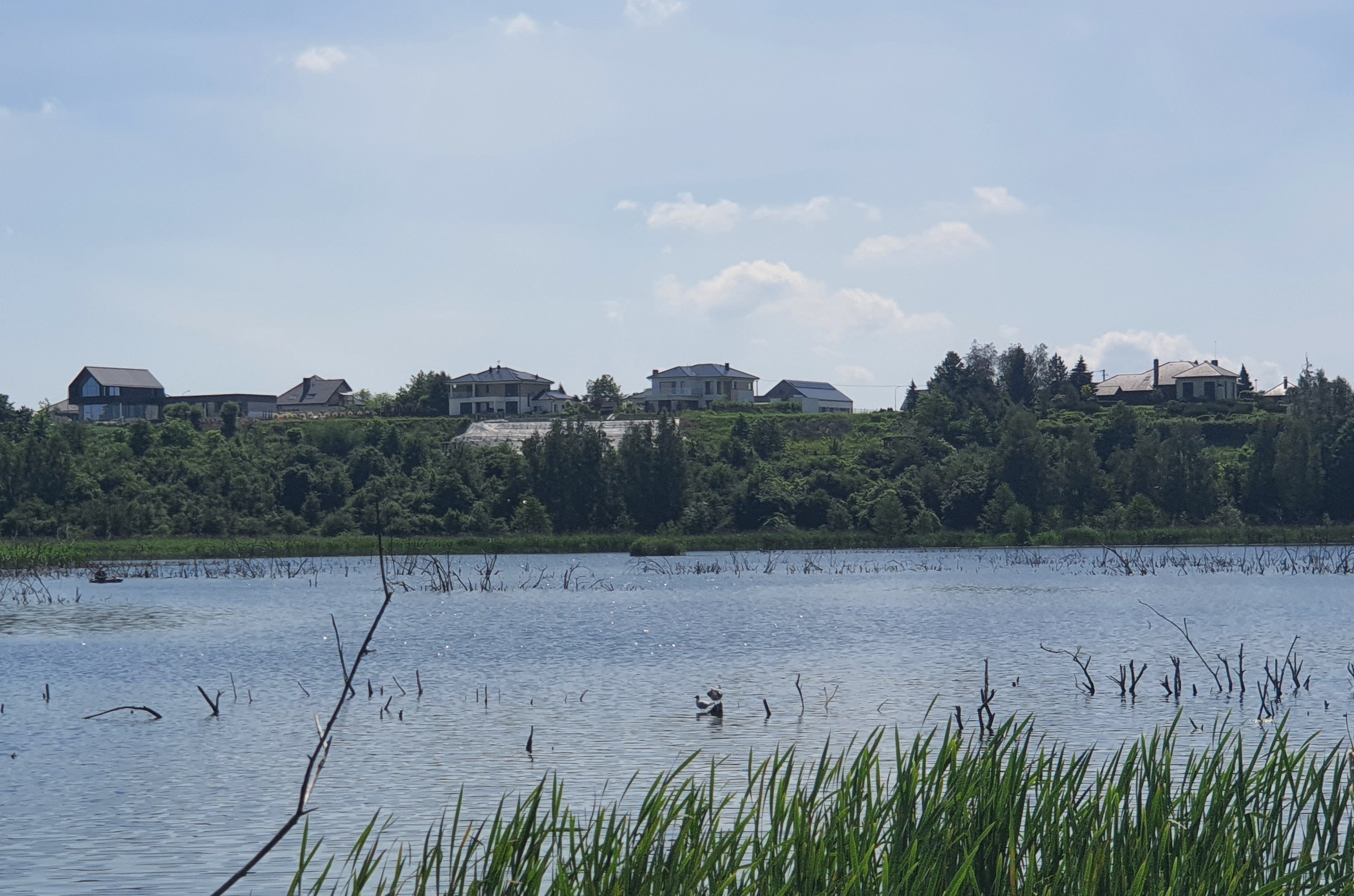

- Location within Poland
- Coordinates: 52°26′N 17°6′E
- Country: Poland
- Voivodeship: Greater Poland
- County: Poznań
- Gmina: Swarzędz
- Population: 324

Gortatowo [ɡɔrtaˈtɔvɔ] is a village in the administrative district of Gmina Swarzędz, within Poznań County, Greater Poland Voivodeship, in west-central Poland.
