= Baranowo, Gmina Mosina =

Baranowo
- Village
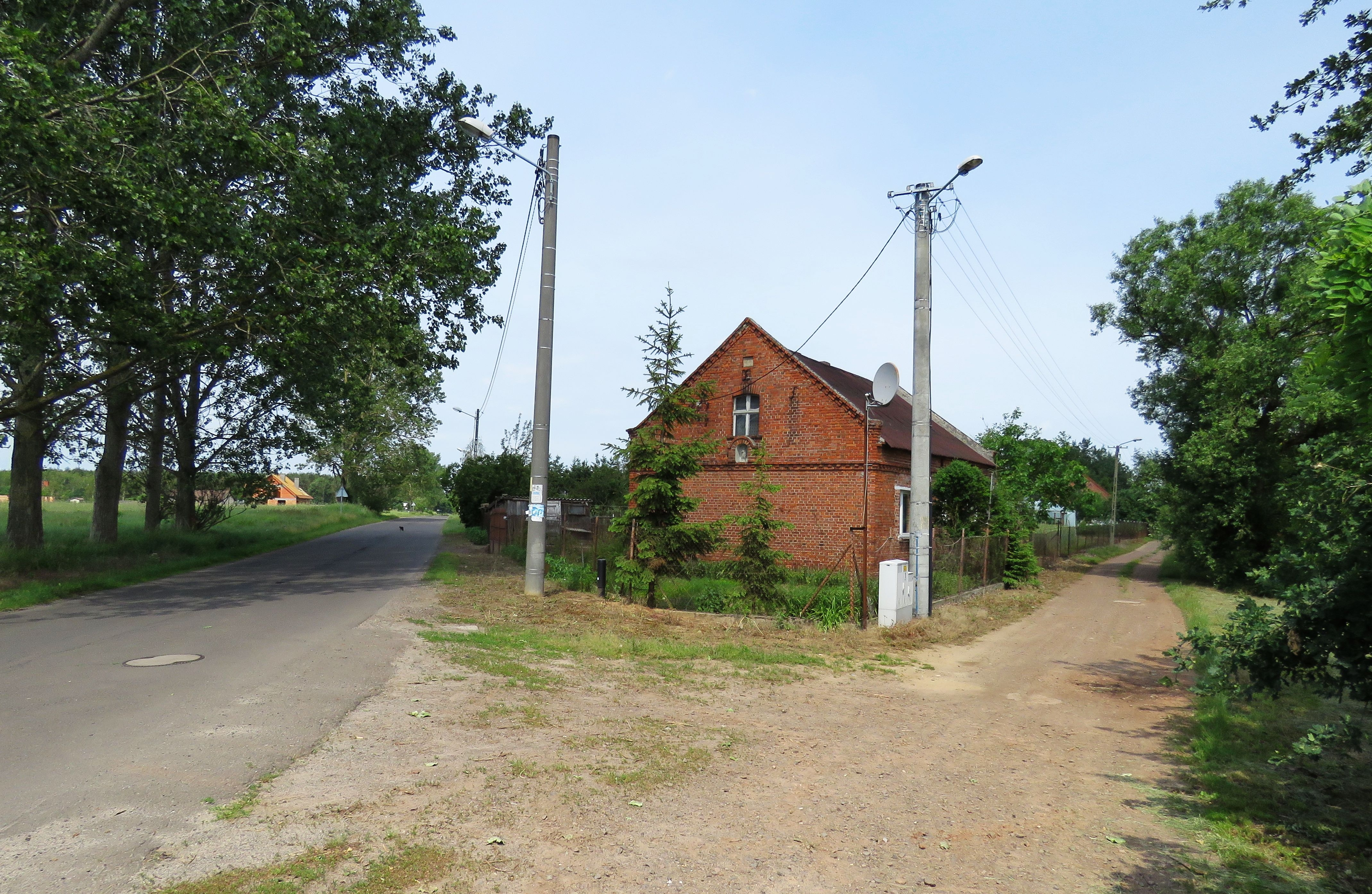

- Location within Poland
- Coordinates: 52°12′55″N 16°55′13″E
- Country: Poland
- Voivodeship: Greater Poland
- County: Poznań
- Gmina: Mosina
- Population: 40

Baranowo [baraˈnɔvɔ] is a village in the administrative district of Gmina Mosina, within Poznań County, Greater Poland Voivodeship, in west-central Poland.
