= Gorazdowo, Greater Poland Voivodeship =

Gorazdowo
- Village
- Location within Poland
- Coordinates: 52°14′N 17°41′E
- Country: Poland
- Voivodeship: Greater Poland
- County: Września
- Gmina: Kołaczkowo

Gorazdowo [ɡɔrazˈdɔvɔ] is a village in the administrative district of Gmina Kołaczkowo, within Września County, Greater Poland Voivodeship, in west-central Poland.
