= Zaleska =

Zaleska may be a feminine form of:

- Zaleski, Polish and Ukrainian surname
- Záleský, Czech surname
