= Institutes of Agriculture, Bydgoszcz =

Institutes of Agriculture of Bydgoszcz
- Polish: Polish: Instytuty Rolnicze w Bydgoszczy
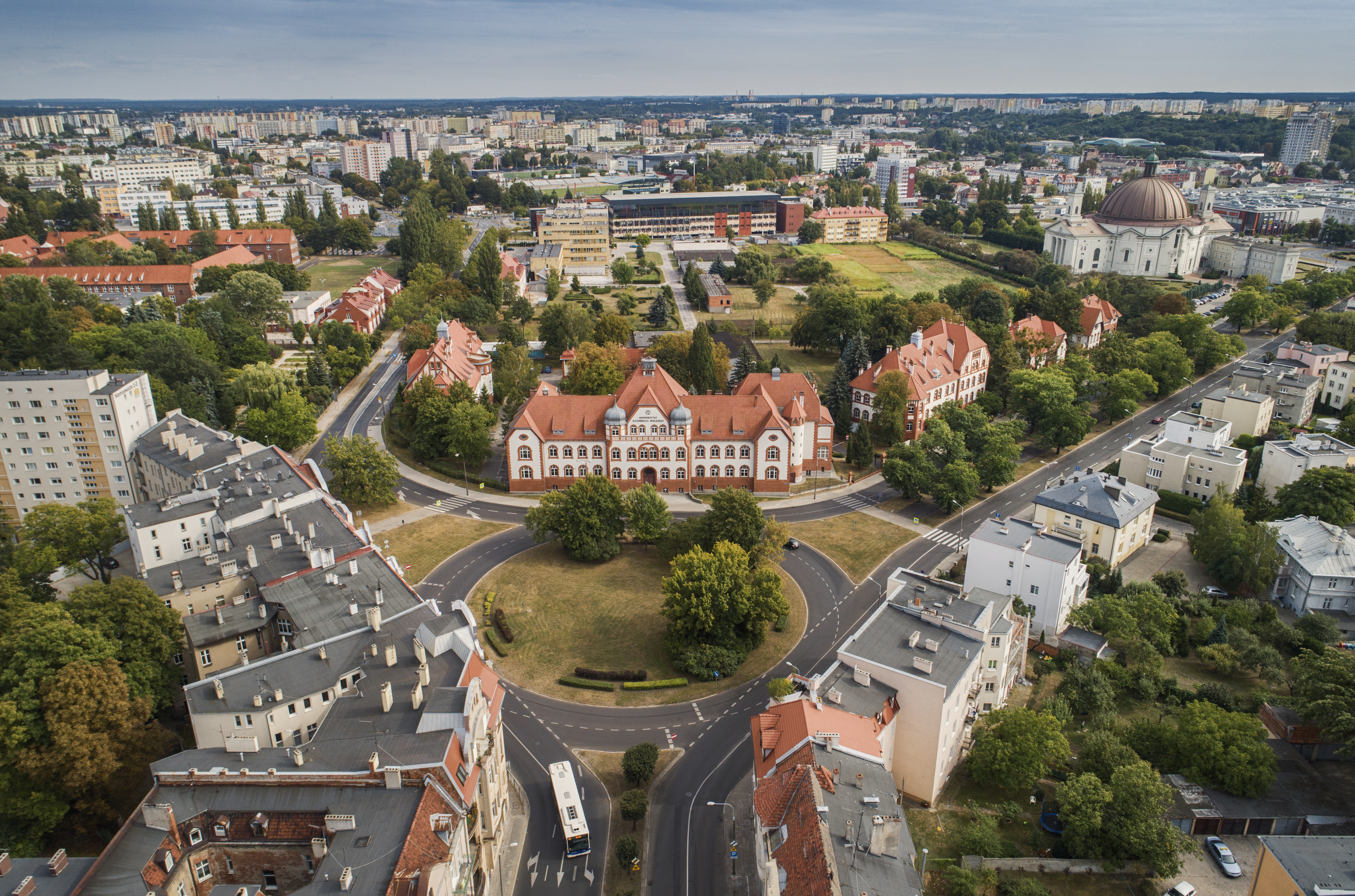
- Interactive map of the Institutes of Agriculture of Bydgoszcz area

General information
- Type: Institute
- Architectural style: Eclecticism, modern architecture
- Classification: Nr.601253, Reg. A/676/1-8, May 20, 1992
- Location: Poland, 2 Józef Weyssenhoff Square, Bydgoszcz
- Coordinates: 53°7′47″N 18°00′56″E
- Elevation: 48m
- Completed: 1906

Design and construction
- Architect: Delius

The Institutes of Agriculture are a complex of historic buildings in Bydgoszcz, Poland. Today they belong to city public administration, focused since their erection to teaching and research. They are located in the area delineated by Ossoliński Alley, Powstańców Wielkopolskich Alley, and Karol Szymanowski Street. The ensemble dates back from the early 20th century and is registered since 1992 on the Kuyavian-Pomeranian Voivodeship Heritage List.

== Location ==
The architectural group of buildings, located in the eastern part of downtown Bydgoszcz, covers an area of 7.5hectares. In the 2010s, two recent edifices have been added in the east of the area:

- The Plant Breeding and Aclimatization Institute – National Research Institute (Polish: Instytut Hodowli i Aklimatyzacji Roślin-Państwowy Instytut Badawczy);
- The main library of the Kazimierz Wielki University in Bydgoszcz.

Originally, the plot was divided into two parts: on the west were buildings of the institute, on the east the 5ha sector was devoted to field and research vegetation, with ancillary buildings (livestock shelters, greenhouses and a barn).

The main building stands on Weyssenhoff Square, at the eastern tip of Adam Mickiewicz Alley. One institute building and two houses are located on the eastern side of Ossoliński Alley and two other buildings stand on the southern frontage of Powstańców Wielkopolskich Alley. The grand St. Vincent de Paul Basilica Minor covers the southern flank of the sector. Streets surrounding the architectural ensemble have been delineated shortly before the construction of the institute.

== History ==
=== Prussian period ===
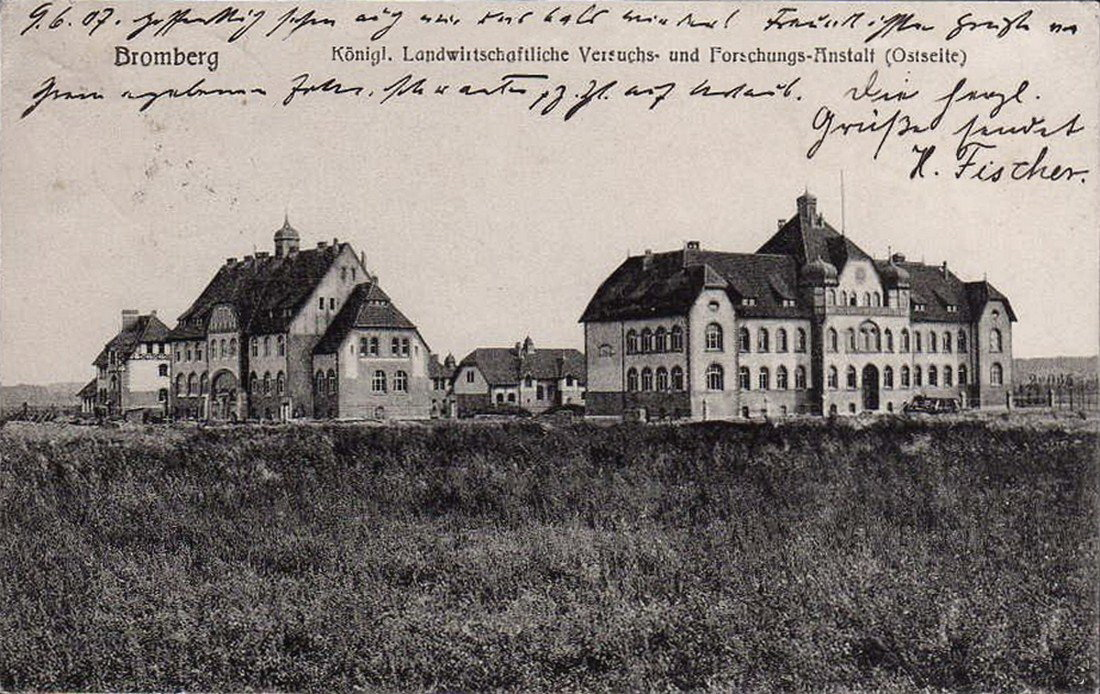
View ca 1906

The establishment of agricultural institutes in Bydgoszcz stems from long-lasting efforts to create a university in the city. First steps were taken in 1873 while celebrating the 100th anniversary of Netze District joining Kingdom of Prussia: a municipal petition was then sent to the government in Berlin supporting the creation of a higher education facility, but the idea did not prevail, mainly because of the low number of high school graduates in Bromberg. Another request was proffered in 1886, still with no avail.

Appeals to the Prussian government succeeded on August 26, 1902, as this time the petition was supported by the governmental program aiming at bolstering the economy of the eastern lands of German Empire. As consequences of this policy, Prussian authorities decided to create universities in Gdańsk and Poznań, while Bromberg was targeted for hosting a research centre in agricultural production, since the city was located in a highly agriculturally developed area (Kujawy, Krajna, Pałuki, Chełmno Land). Such institutes already existed in other higher faculties, such as in Königsberg, Wrocław and Berlin, but they were too far away to carry out proper research in relationship with the agriculture in the area of Poznań and Pomerania. The scientific program of the institution was inspired from the one operating in the Institute of Berlin. The official approval from the government of Prussia to establish an Agricultural Institute in Bromberg was made in October 1902. The same year was decided to build a complex of edifices, in the one hand to promote research works, in the other hand to carry out professional training of farmers practitioners, teachers and to host administrative staff.

In the same year they are taken to the decision to build a complex of buildings for institutes and imposed their task research of practical. November 15, 1902 conference was held with the participation of Commissioners of Public Works and the Ministry of Finance and Agriculture, on the organizational matters related to the establishment of the institute. The city authorities Bydgoszcz pledged to give up the construction of the facility area at the contemporary north-eastern edge of the town and there pave new streets – Hohenzollernstrasse and Bülow Platz (today al. Ossolińskich and square Weyssenhoff). The city has also bringing water and gas and, in the near future, the transfer of assets for experimental purposes.

The initial blueprint was designed in 1903 by construction engineer Herman Delius. He designed three buildings, serving as scientific institutes:

- The main building for the Institute of Plant Pathology and Technical Melioration (German: Pflanzenpatchologische und Meliorationenstechnische Institut);
- The building of the Institute of Animal Hygiene (German: Tierhygienisches Institut);
- The building of the Institute of Chemical and Bacteriological Agriculture (German: Agrikultur – Chemisches und Bakteriologisches Institut).

In the vicinity of these institutes were auxiliary buildings: two stables, two greenhouses, a barn and three habitation houses.

Construction started in April 1903, and was completed by spring of 1906. Institutes official opening took place on June 11, 1906, but its activity kicked off as early as July 1, 1904, when dr. Gerlachowi, from the Agricultural Experimental Station in Poznań took charge of the institution. The original name of the institute, Landwirtschaftliche Versuchs und Forschunganstallten (Agricultural testing and research facilities), was changed in September 1906 to Kaiser Wilhelm Institut für Landwirtschaft zu Bromberg: it kept this naming till the end of World War I.

The facility was associated with the scientific society Kaiser-Wilhelm Gesellschaft zur Förderung der Wissenschaften (Kaiser-Wilhelm Society for the Advancement of Science). A board of trustees comprising farmers, representatives of the region of Poznań and Bromberg, and the director of the institute, had direct control on the institution and linked with the provincial authorities and with other agricultural bodies. This board was chaired by the president of the region of Bromberg.

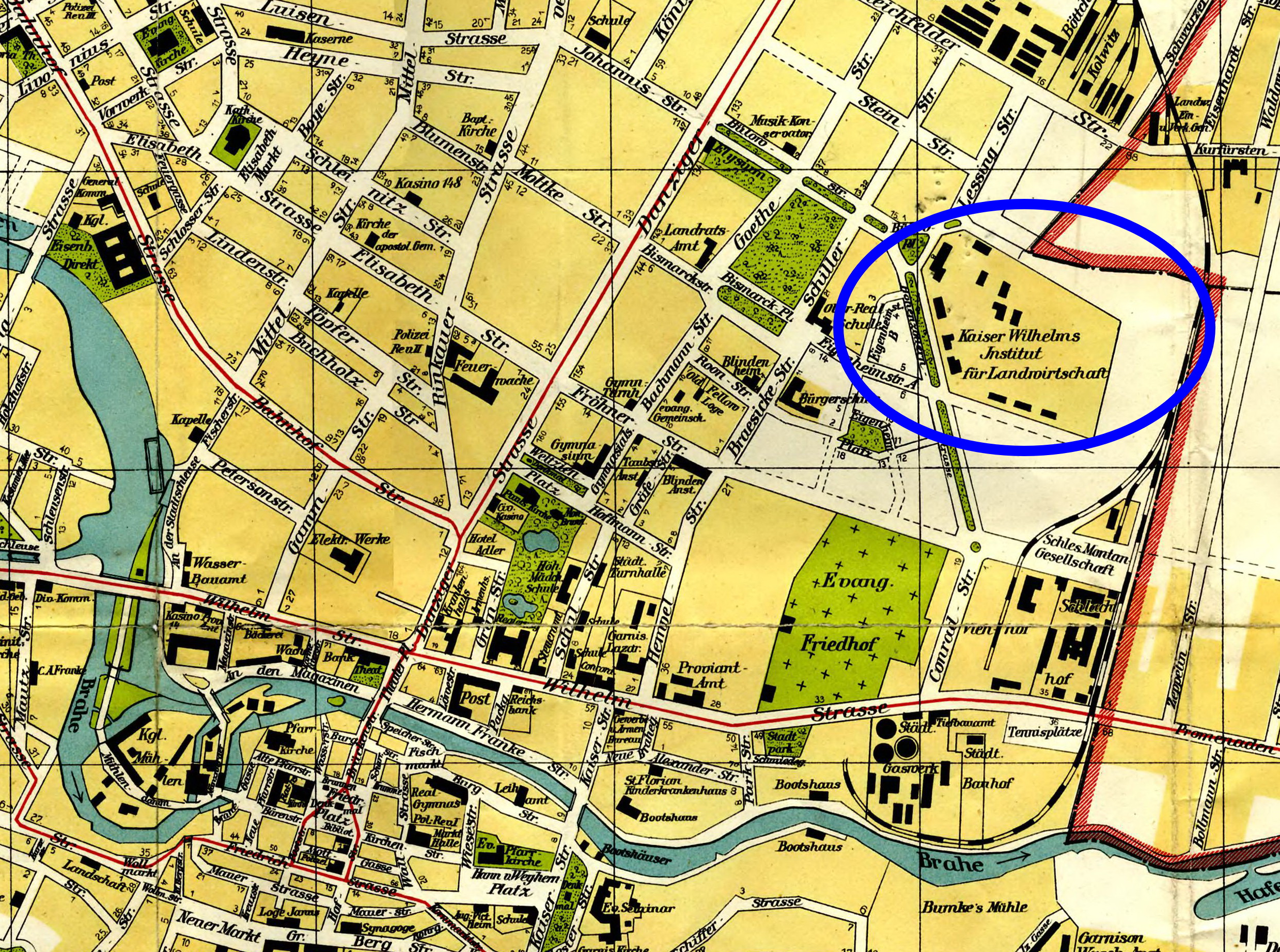
Agriculture institutes ca 1914

Under the terms of the reference of the institute, research, experimental, scientific, and consulting tasks were distributed among four departments:

1. Agricultural chemistry, Bacteriology and farming seeds;
2. Melioration of agrotechnics;
3. Plant pathology;
4. Veterinary medicine.

Systematic research began in 1906, and in 1908, the first volume of publications presenting results was issued. In the following years, four to six issues were published annually, under the title Mittelungen des Kaiser Wilhelms Institut für Landwirtschaft zu Bromberg (Information from the Kaiser Wilhelm Institute for Agriculture in Bromberg). The most important scientific achievements from Bromberg institutes were:

- identifying a potato virus;
- aphids disease on peach tree;
- fight against bovine tuberculosis;
- fields irrigation and fertilization impact on harvesting.

In 1912, the agricultural chemistry branch set up an experimental farm in Mochle near Bydgoszcz, to conduct extensive research on nutrition and plant and animal development in natural conditions. Another experimental farm in Pęchowo was worked out, as well as cooperation with land owners to carry out experiments in their fields. Beyond research activities, the Kaiser Wilhelm Institut conducted also teaching sessions, in order to promote the results of research and experience into field agriculture. It also held public lectures on various topics, regularly reported by daily newspapers. Finally, the facility trained professionals in the field of botany, agricultural bacteriology, agrochemicals, land development, and plant or animal pathology.

Famous scientists worked at the institute, among whom:

- Professor Max Gerlach (also director), called the King of potatoes in East Prussia;
- Professor dr Richard Schander, specialist in the field of drainage using plants;
- Professor Freckmann.

The institute also employed as a young researcher Theodor Roemer, later a professor in plant breeding at University of Halle.

In 1913, a project of extension was approved in order to use plots of land lying on the western side of the Ossoliński Alley, in order to develop areas for exhibition and trading: the outbreak of World War I interrupted the work and the plan was never completed. In 1919, prior to Bydgoszcz returned to Polish territory, employees, research records, plant preparations and laboratory devices were moved to Frankfurt an der Oder, and then to Gorzów Wielkopolski then part of Germany. However, this did not stop the activities of the Institutes, since Poland kept using actively the scientific buildings on the site.

=== Interwar period (1920–1939) ===
With the rise of the Second Polish Republic, an intensive development of Bydgoszcz institute occurred, as it acted as the National Institute of Agricultural Science till 1927. After this date, Bydgoszcz facility was a branch of the National Institute of Scientific Agriculture in Puławy. The institution was reorganized on the model of a university, echoing the structure known under Prussian rule with four faculties: Agricultural chemistry, Plant pathology, Animal hygiene and Land development. The facility came into competition with the agricultural research centre of Poznań, reducing its independence and its development. Notable changes, including a significant increase of scientific personnel, occurred shortly before World War II (April 1938), when Bydgoszcz became the capital of the newly created Pomeranian Voivodeship.

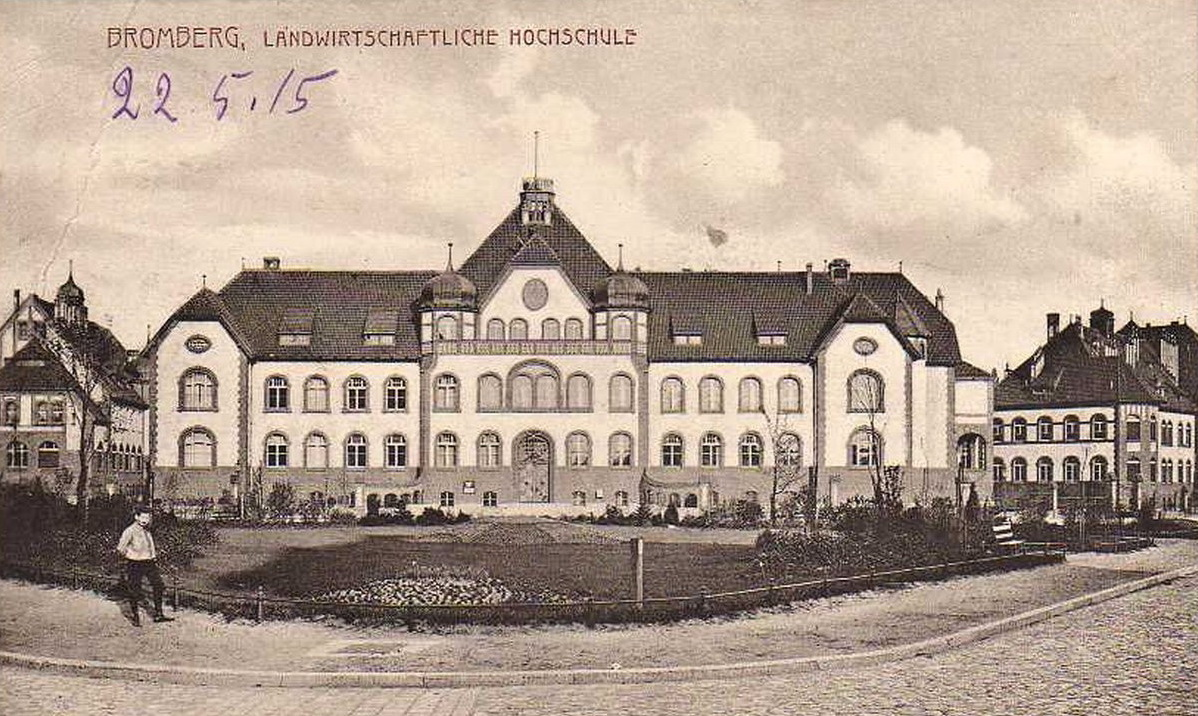
Buildings ca 1915

Until 1939, the establishment had the following departments:

- Agricultural chemistry;
- Horticulture;
- Plant pathology;
- Land development (till 1932);
- Dairy (till 1932);
- Fishing economics (till 1932);
- Animal hygiene (till 1935).

The facility had experimental fields, indoor horticulture halls, a small park and a meteorological station. During this period, Bydgoszcz Institutes took part to numerous achievements in various fields:

- Research and fight against potato wart disease, led by professor Ludwik Garbowski and Dr. Piotr Leszczenko;
- Breeding of new potato varieties (Dr. Henryk Dołkowski);
- Animal hygiene (prof. Kazimierz Panek);
- Ichthyology (prof. Włodzimierz Kulmatycki).

From 1921 to 1924, director was prof. Kazimierz Bassalik, a Polish pioneer in microbiology, who established in Bydgoszcz in February 1923, a branch of the Polish Copernicus Society of Naturalists – the first in the Second Polish Republic, bringing together 58 members. From 1922 to 1939, prof. Włodzimierz Kulmatycki was an employee of the Institute and led the first scientific fishing institution in Poland. He also pioneered the area of water pollution and wastewater. Such researches contributed to elaborating state bills preventing fish poisoning in rivers. In 1930 Włodzimierz Kulmatycki founded in Bydgoszcz Poland's first scientific institution to study the purity of inland waters.

Between 1920 and 1922, Institutes have carried out in their buildings an Agricultural University, which activities began in November 1919 in Poznań. This Agricultural Academy had a quasi-academic curriculum, comprising 5 Academic terms. It allowed the promotion of Bydgoszcz facility to the level of a real university, thanks to the excellent staff coming from the whole country (Lwów, Kraków, Dubliany, Poznań) and favorable local conditions. Unfortunately, in 1923 this academy moved to Cieszyn.

=== Second World War ===
During the occupation, German forces kept conducting research, despite the fact that the institute suffered significant losses. In autumn 1939, mass executions were performed, killing many scientists, technicians and administrative personnel, among whom institute director, professor Dr. Vladimir Kulmatycki.

=== 1945–1989 ===
In the second half of 1945, the institution resumed its works, as a branch of the National Institute of Scientific Agricultural in Pulawy (Polish: Państwowy Instytut Naukowy Gospodarstwa Wiejskiego). Bydgoszcz institutes developed many research departments in the 1950s and the 1960s, leading to the following branches:

- Soil Science and Plant;
- Plant Breeding and Acclimatization;
- Zootechnics;
- Land development;
- Animal physiology and Nutrition Sciences;
- Potato research;
- Central Agricultural Library.

In addition, since 1945, a local Branch of the Institute of Veterinary Medicine has been running (since 1995, National Veterinary Institute).

In the 1980s, a new building has been erected on Powstańców Wielkopolskich Alley, where have been gradually transferred the existing scientific institutions.

=== Recent period (since 1990) ===
In 1996, after a re-organization, Bydgoszcz institute comprised the following departments:

1. Bydgoszcz branch of the Institute of Plant Breeding and Acclimatization (Polish: Instytut Hodowli i Aklimatyzacji Roślin (IHAR)), dealing with genetics, animal husbandry, cytology, embryology, physiology, biochemistry, cultivation and fertilizer, mechanization, crop diseases and pests (sugar beet, fodder beet, rutabaga, turnip, carrot and chicory). This institute possesses many departments and laboratories, such as:

- Department of Genetics, Plant breeding, Plant diseases & Root pests, Crop production technology;
- Laboratories of Biotechnology, Cytogenetics & breeding, Plant pathology & entomology, Agroecology;
- Botanical Garden in Bydgoszcz, in Myślęcinek area, north of the city.

2. Bydgoszcz branch of the National Veterinary Institute in Puławy. This research department focuses primarily on diagnosis and control of animal disease (horses, domestic cattle). This department owns the following departments and laboratories:

- Department of Equine diseases;
- Department of Deficiency diseases;
- Department of Reproduction Pathophysiology;
- Laboratory of Biotechnology of Animal Reproduction;
- Veterinary Experimental Station.

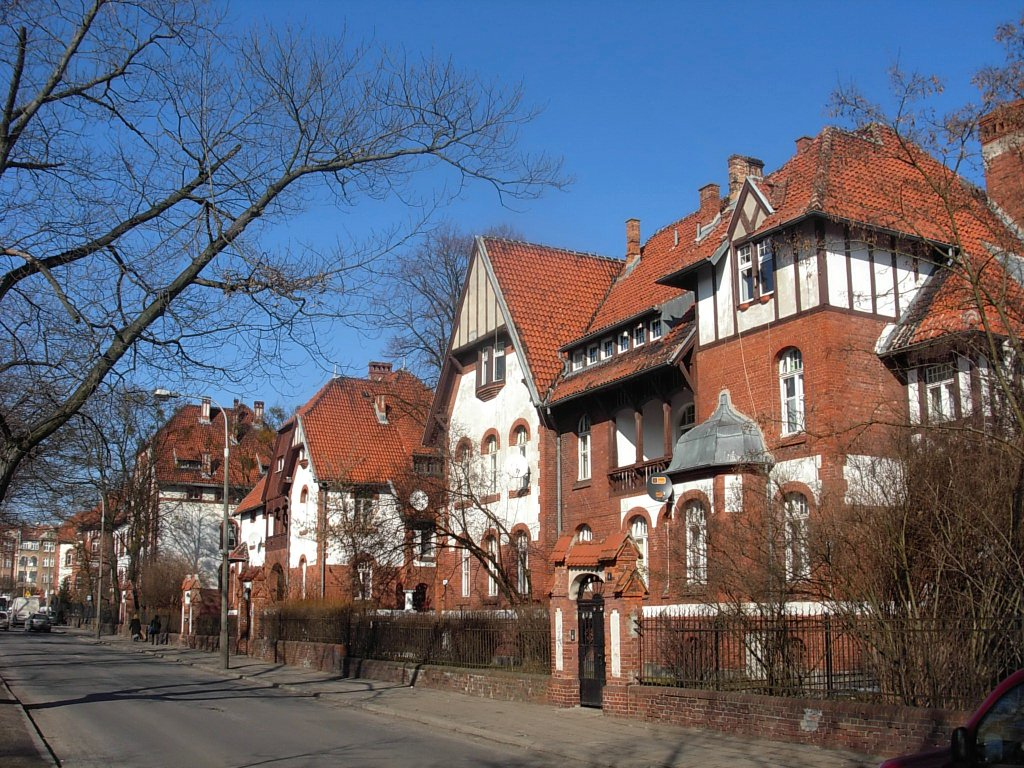
View of the buildings in Ossoliński Alley

3. Bydgoszcz branch of the Institute of Potato in Bonin, with a local laboratory of Disease and Pest Quarantine.

4. Bydgoszcz branch of the Institute for Land Development and Grassland farming in Falenty.

5. Bydgoszcz branch of the Central Agricultural Library (Polish: Centralna Biblioteka Rolnicza (CBR)) in Warsaw. The CBR has been established in 1886 and counted 1700 volumes in 1906. In 2004, this local library has been disbanded, its book collection, approximately 60 thousand volumes, has been divided between the CBR in Warsaw and the Main Library of the Kazimierz Wielki University in Bydgoszcz (UKW).

After 1990, some buildings, including the main one located at Weyssenhoff Square 11, have been handed out to University of Bydgoszcz (UKW). In the following years, an extensive renovation of these facilities have been carried out.

In 2017, the following buildings of the institute are under the management of the University of Bydgoszcz-UKW:

- Main building at Weyssenhoff Square 11, housing the Faculty of Mathematics, Physics and Technology;
- Building at Ossoliński Alley 12, housing the Faculty of Natural Sciences;
- Building at Powstańców Wielkopolskich Street 2, housing the Faculty of Pedagogy and Psychology.

== Buildings ==
All the buildings of the Agricultural Institutes have been erected between 1903 and 1906 with reference to the Prussian architectural national style. Many instances of this architecture can still be noticed in Bydgoszcz:

- High Seminary of Bydgoszcz, at 18 Grodzka Street;
- High School No. 1 at Freedom Square.

The predominant style is a mix of Neo Gothic and eclecticism, with Historicism and Art Nouveau influences. Due to the unstable clay soil, buildings foundations had to be reinforced with concrete rails.

=== Main building – 11 Square Weyssenhoff ===
Registered on Kuyavian-Pomeranian Voivodeship heritage list, Nr.601254, Reg. A/676/1-8, May 20, 1992

The building was erected at a focal location among the ensemble, with both streets (i.e. Ossoliński Alley, Powstańców Wielkopolskich Alley) parting on each side from the square. Originally it housed the Institutes of Plant Pathology and Land Development, with the addition of administrative offices. It was equipped in the basement with a boiler room, warehouses for glass instruments, chemicals and coal storage and a service apartment. On the ground floor stood the central hall, director's office, administrative offices, a library and zoology, botany, chemistry laboratories. On the first floor there were two lecture halls with 126 and 188 seats, and a large auditorium (190 seats) equipped with experimental table/projector. In addition, on the first floor were a library, a drawing room, and weather station. The attic housed a photo studio with a darkroom and two apartments for assistants. Halls and corridors ceiling were covered with cross vaults. Inside one can still admire preserved forged iron balustrade staircase decorated with stylized acanthus leaves, multicolored terrazzo floor with geometric motifs and a wooden coffered ceiling in the hall. Today, the edifice houses UKW branches: institutes of Mathematics, Environmental Mechanics and Applied Informatics, department of Physics, and a subsidiary of the Main University Library.

The edifice displays separated avant-corps, with many different gables pierced by dormers. Roof plinth is covered with Silesian granite tiles, while Monk and Nun tiles cover the rest of the gables. Two turrets stands at each ends, the main avant-corps balcony being flanked by metal-covered onion domes ending with finials. A small panoramic terrace overlooks the ensemble. The main front façade still exhibits an oak door with oval shaped transom light made of crystal panes. On the latter, a Neo-Baroque coat of arms displays the symbols of agriculture (a beehive, a shovel, a hoe, a plow) and a cornucopia overflowing with fruits.

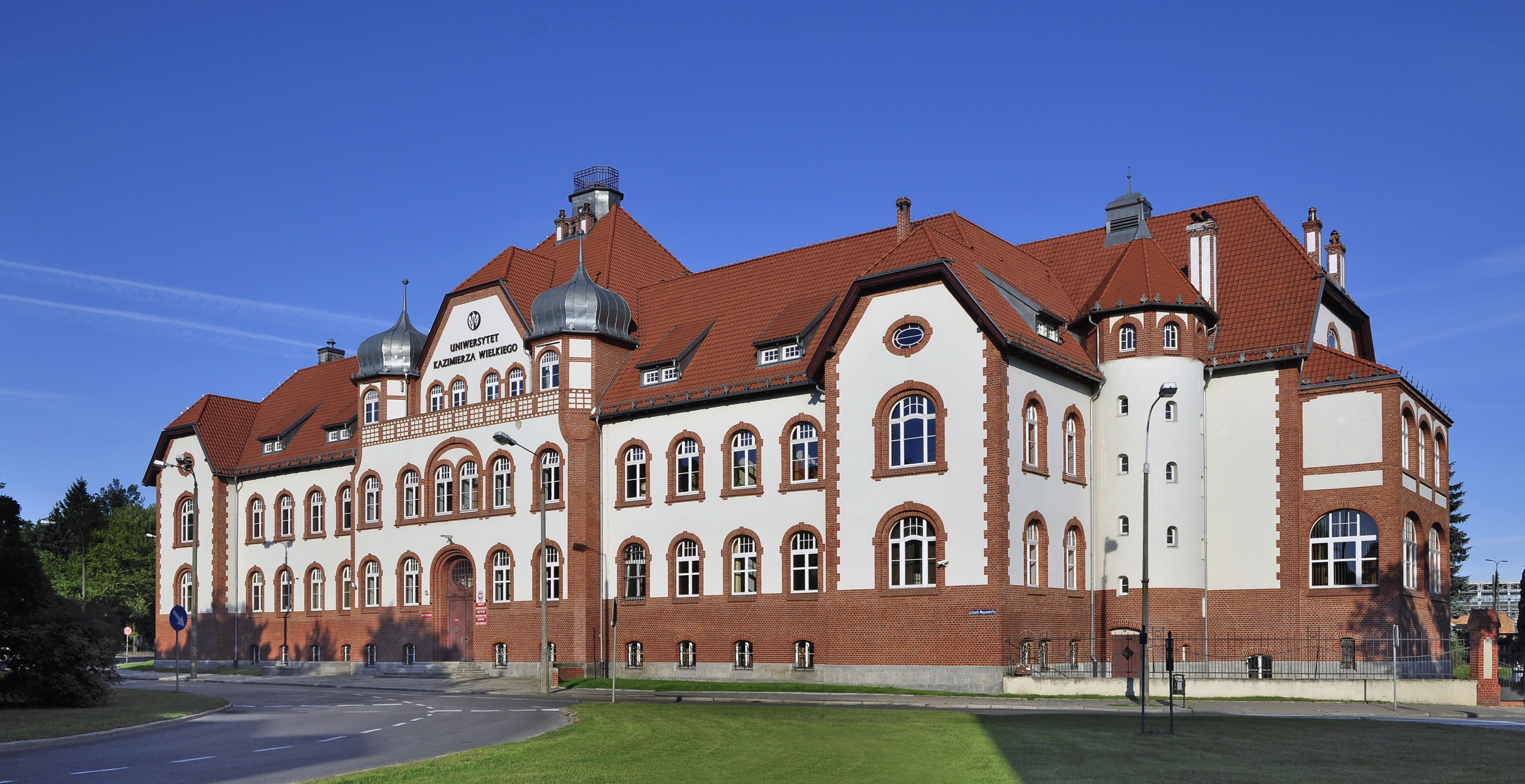
Main frontage

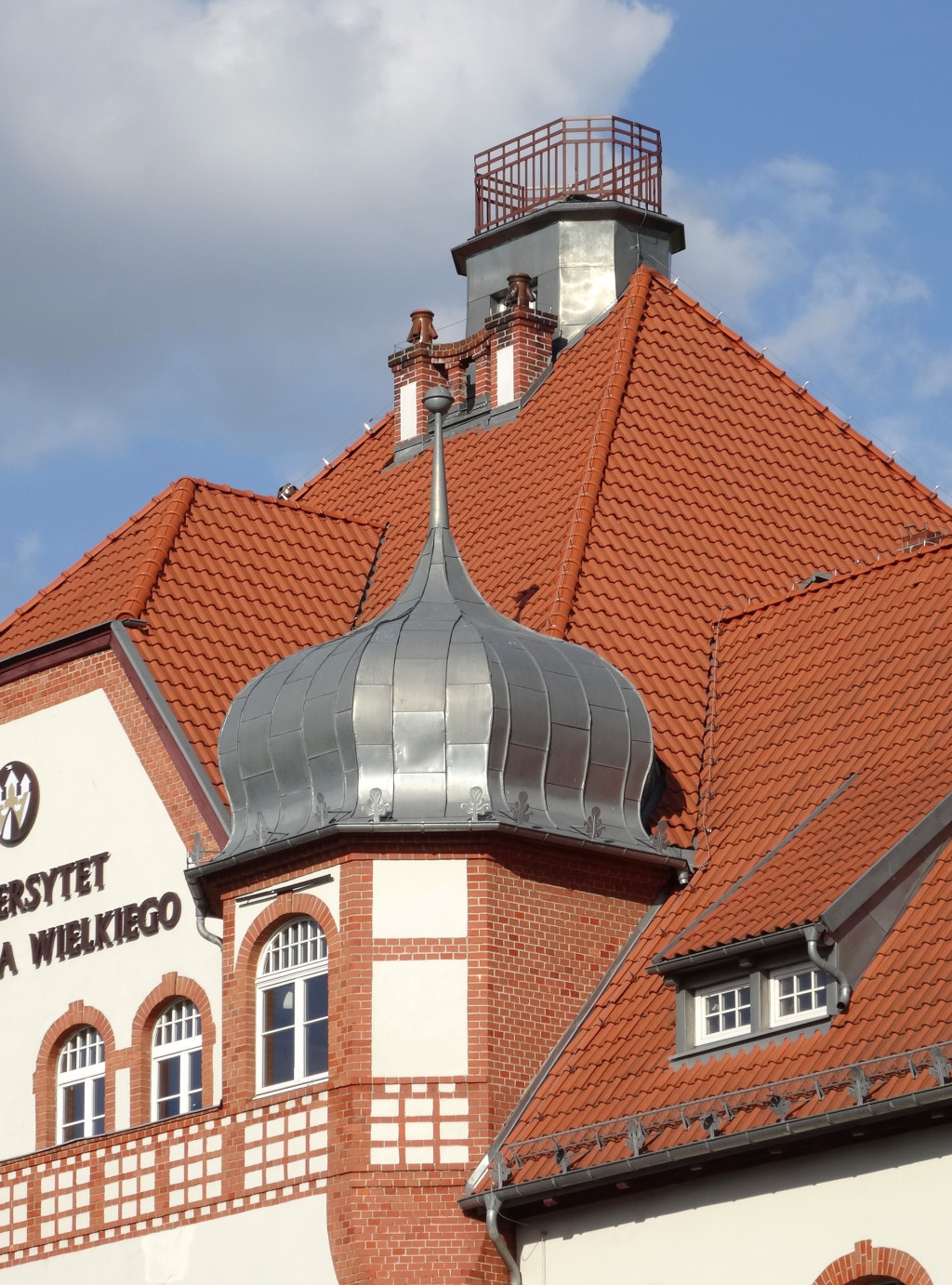
A dome and the panoramic terrace

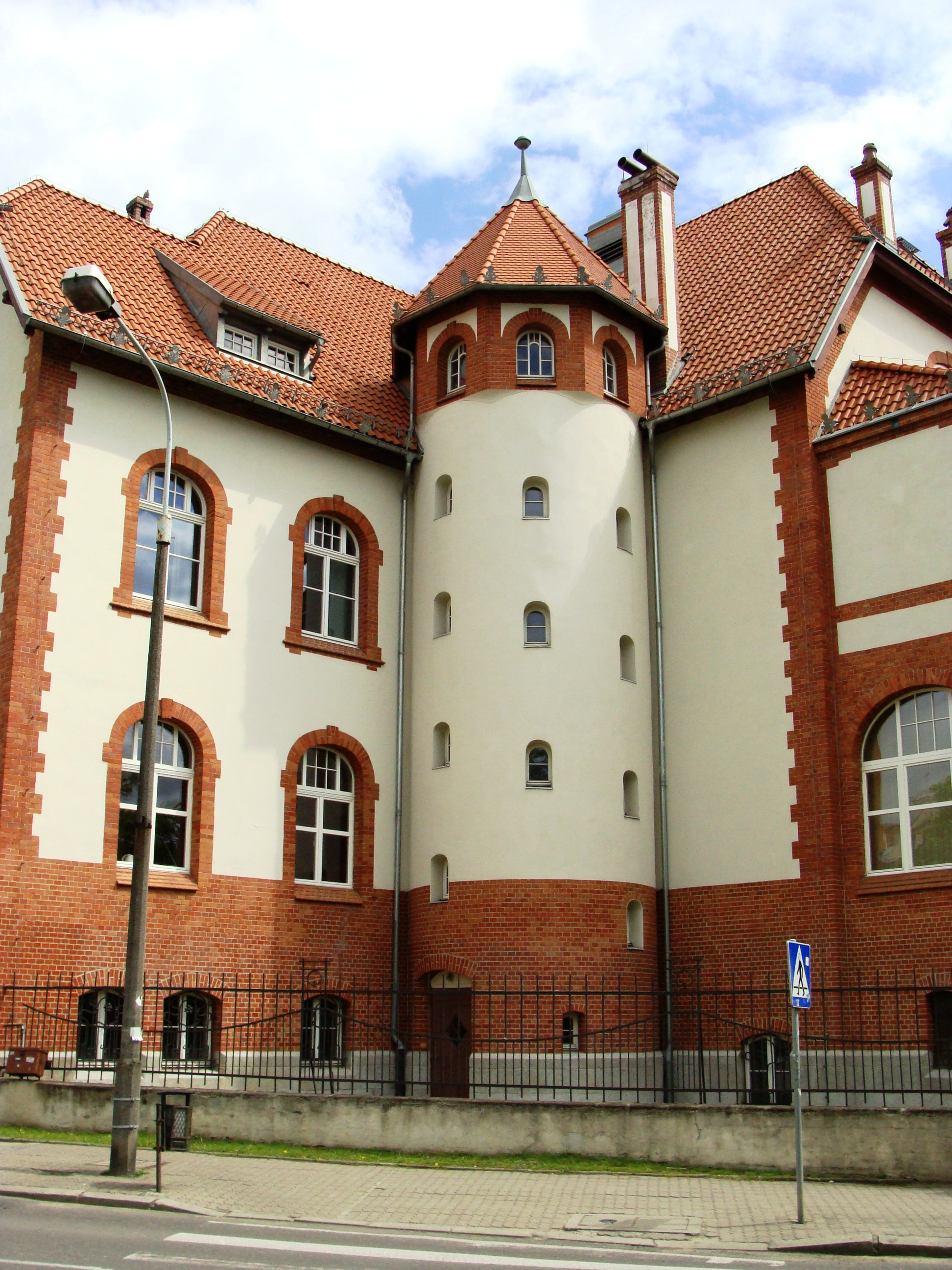
A turret

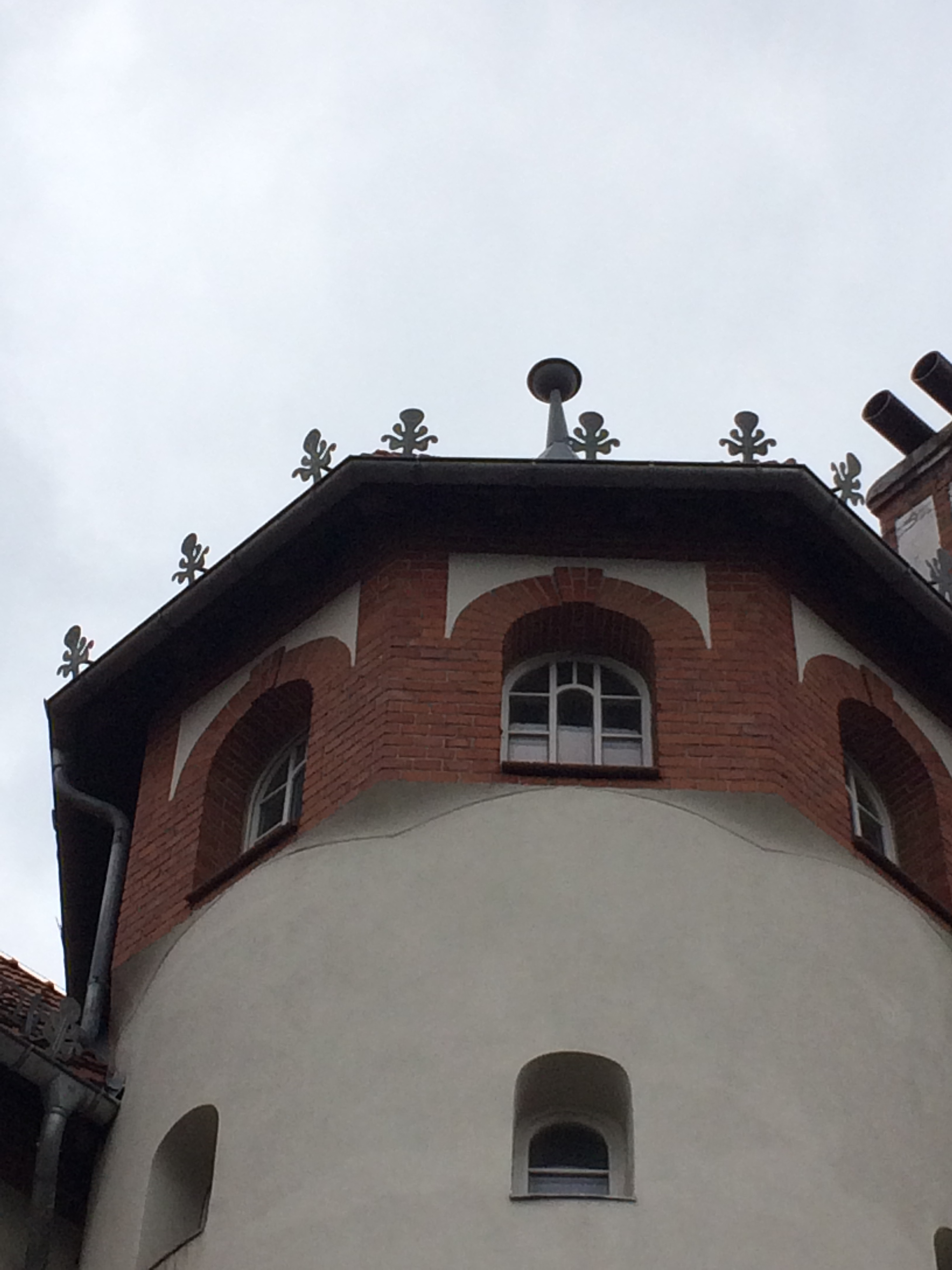
Motifs detail

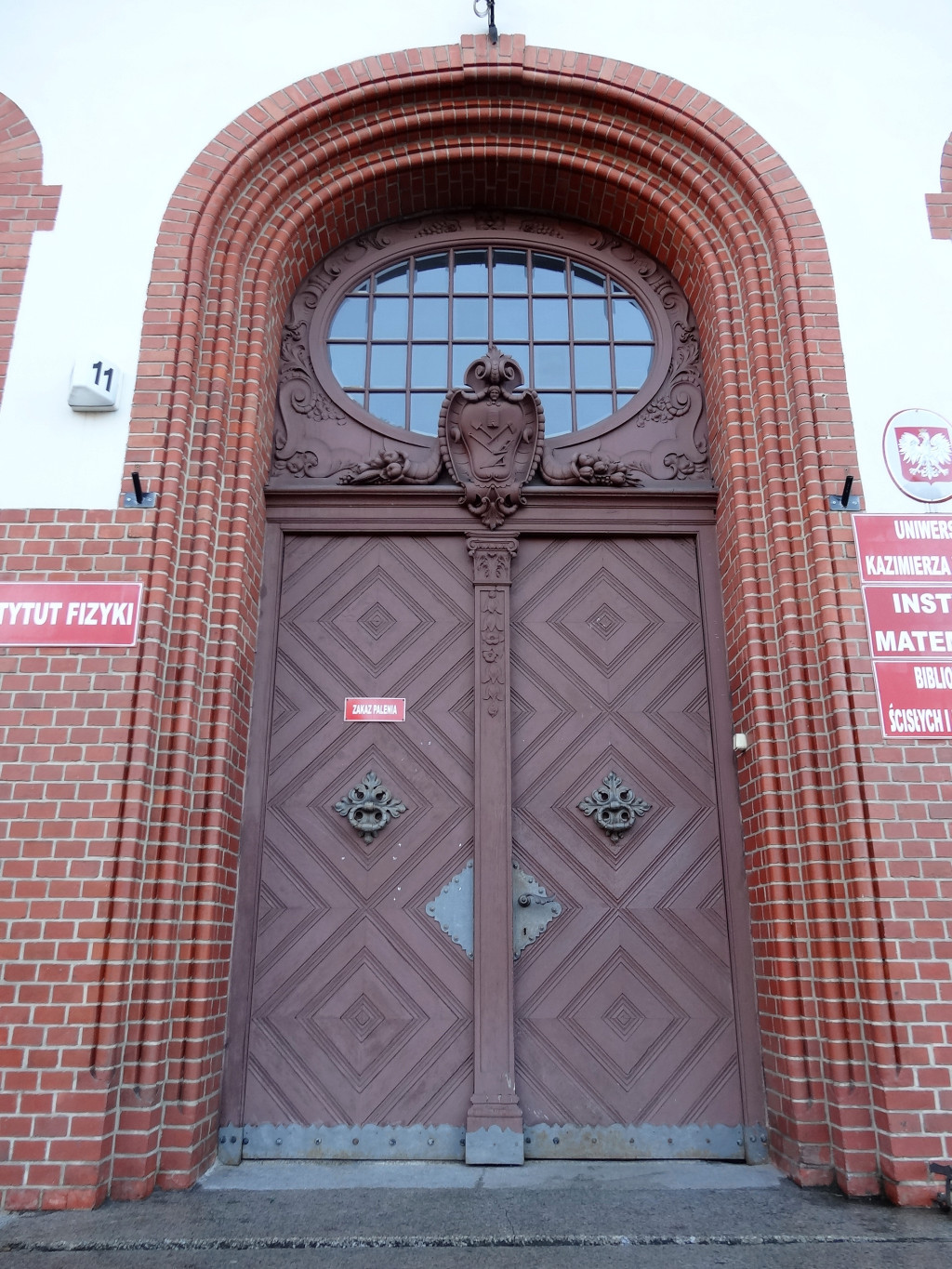
Main door, transom light and coat of arms

=== Habitation house, 4-6 Ossoliński Alley ===
Registered on Kuyavian-Pomeranian Voivodeship heritage list Nr.601258, A/676/1-8, May 20, 1992

The building was designed to house senior officials. It has three levels and has been later divided into smaller accommodations.

The asymmetrical Art Nouveau facade subsumes also elements of eclecticism and Historicism. Various materials are visible: two color bricks, plaster or timber framing. The quaint elevation characteristics rest on the variation of architectural elements: bay windows, balconies, loggias, avant-corps, gables.

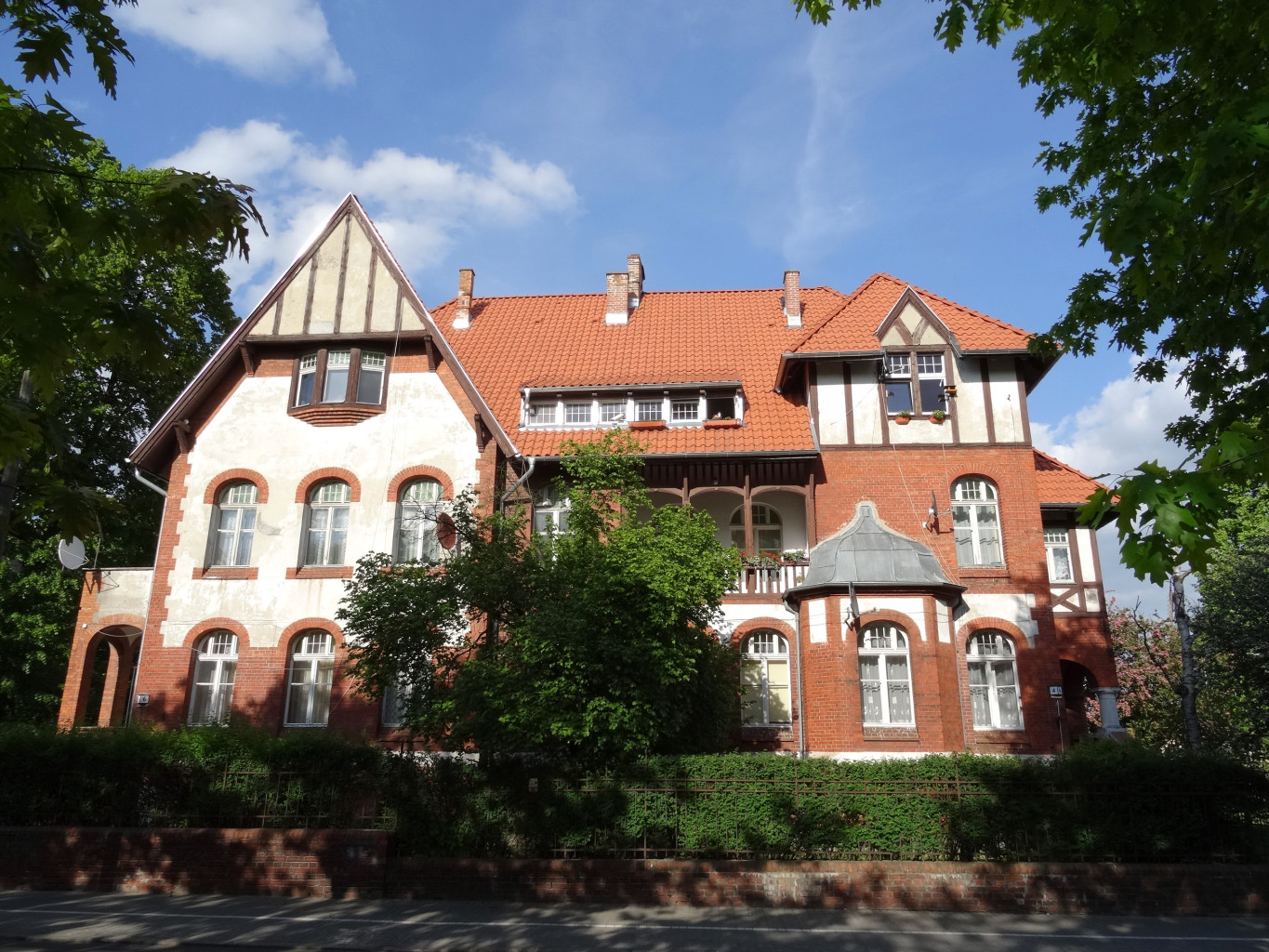
View from Ossoliński Alley

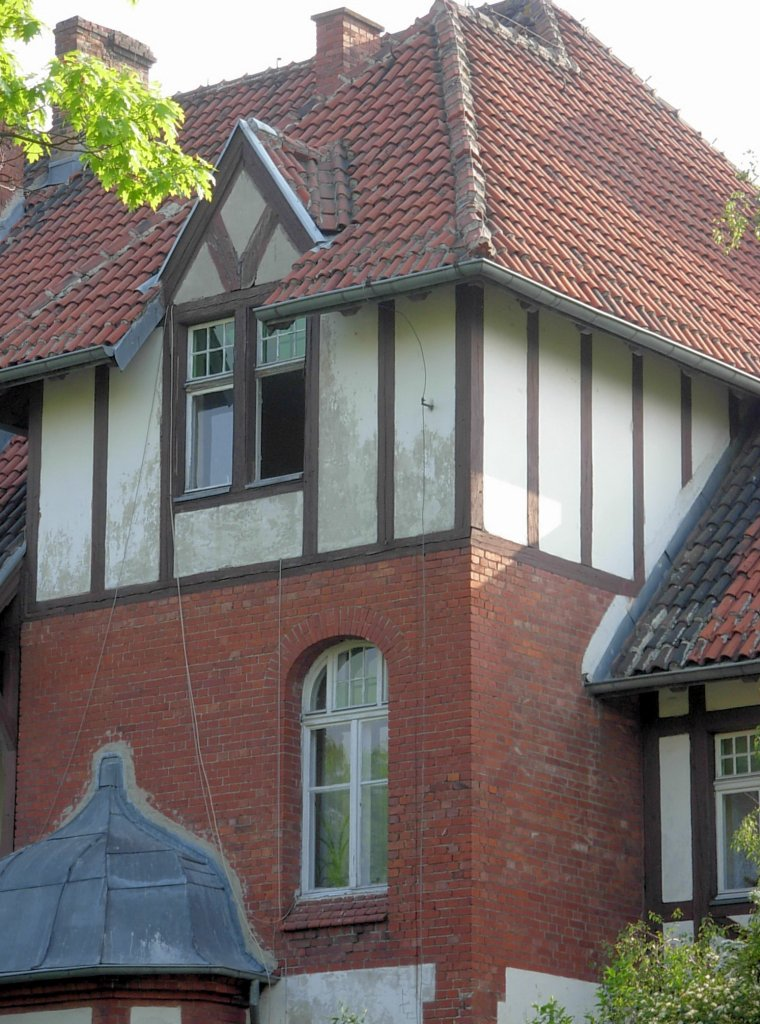
Timber framing detail

=== Habitation house, 8-10 Ossoliński Alley ===
Registered on Kuyavian-Pomeranian Voivodeship heritage list Nr.601259, Reg. A/676/1-8, May 20, 1992

The building was designed to house senior officials. It has three levels and has been later divided into smaller accommodations.

This house is more stubby than its neighbour at 4/6, but still displays eclecticism and historicism style. A more visible use of timber framing is made, especially on the avant-corps facade and in the design of the loggia. An interesting turret, crowned by a finial on its roof, is attached to the northern elevation.

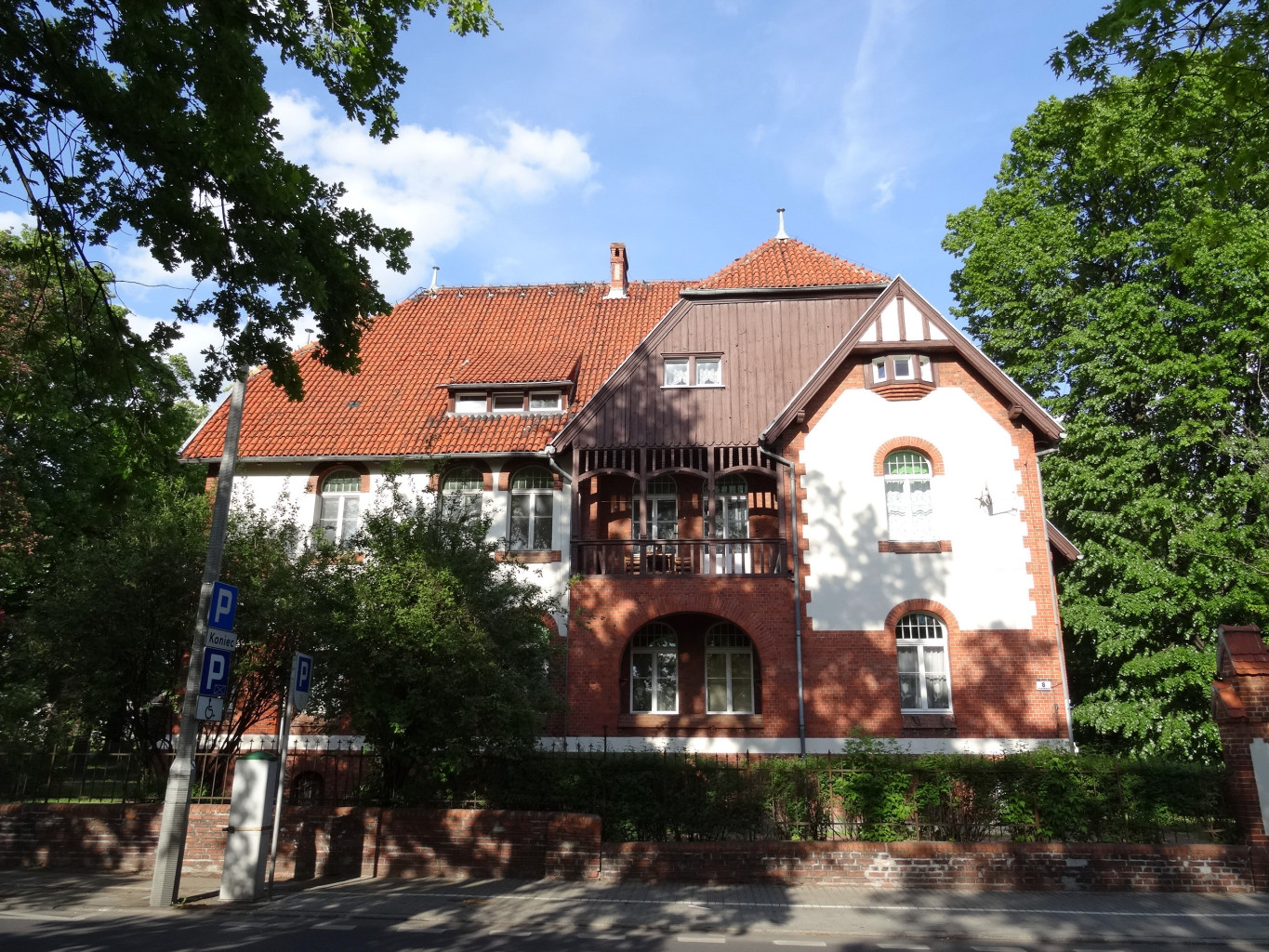
View from Ossoliński Alley

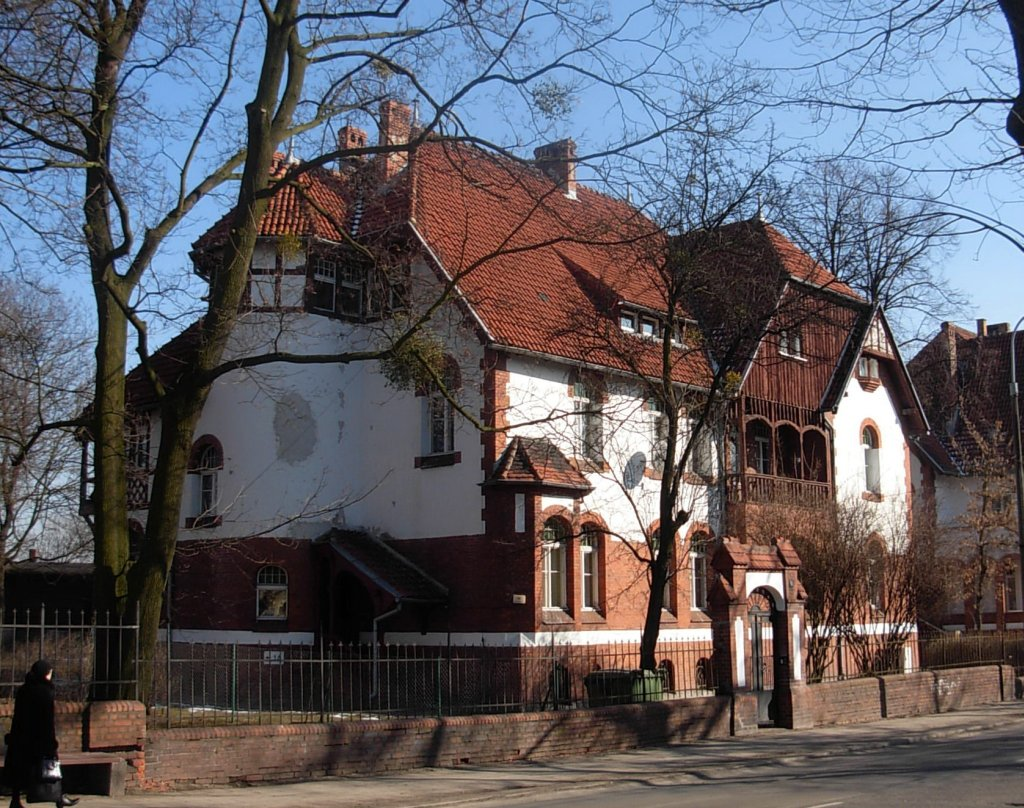
View of the facade with the turret

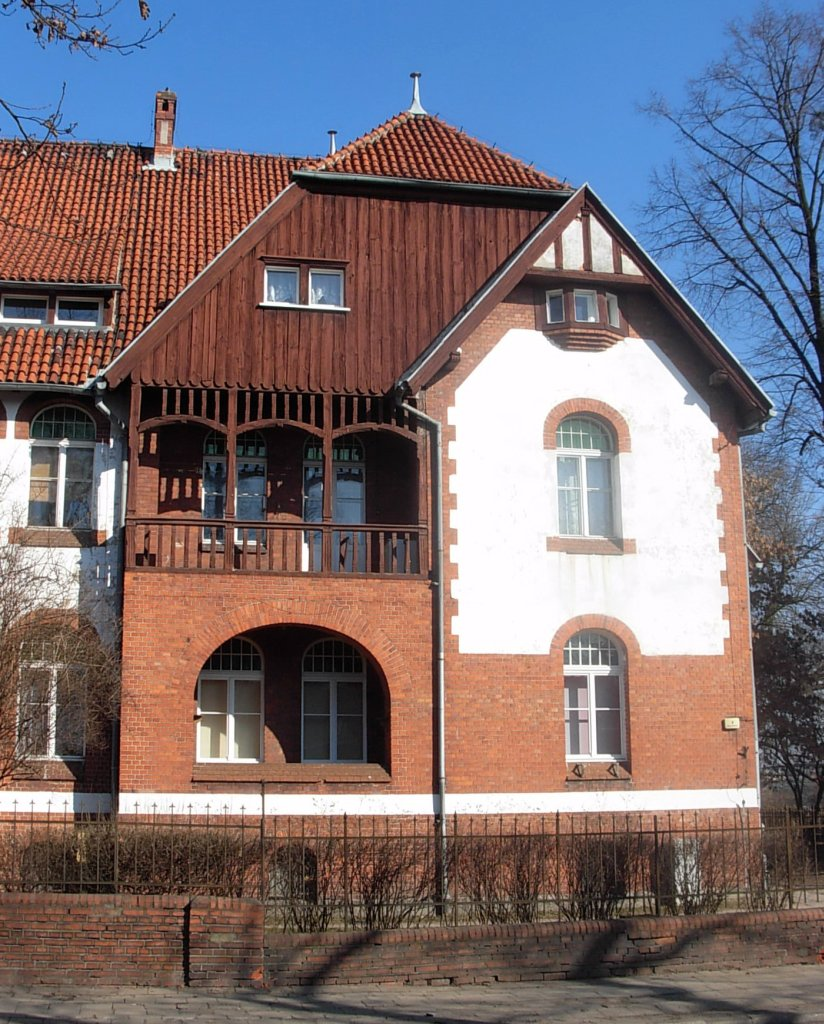
Timber framing elements

=== Agrochemical and Bacteriology institute building, 12 Ossoliński Alley ===
Registered on Kuyavian-Pomeranian Voivodeship heritage list, Nr.601256, Reg.A/676/1-8, May 20, 1992.

This building originally housed the Institute of Agrochemistry and Bacteriology. In the basement were a boiler room, a glass instruments and chemicals storeroom, a dishwashing and drying cabinets for glass and a special machine for sample preparation. There were also distillation facilities which used the water network. Ground floor housed accommodations, a library with a chemistry lab, and the main laboratory spaces with dedicated nitrogen and phosphoric acid areas. The first floor was devoted to bacteriology works, with a sterilization room, a plant breeding laboratory, an electrolyte laboratory, as a lecture hall with 52 seats. The attic was set up with flat for assistants and storage rooms. Today, it hosts UKW Faculty of Natural Sciences (Department of Zoology, Ecology, Botany).

The architecture exhibits robust heavy blocks and two large avant-corps flanking its edges, making it squatter than the surrounding buildings. However, we still recognize the eclecticism and historicism style, common to the architectural ensemble. Roof plinth is covered with Silesian granite tiles, while Monk and Nun tiles cover the rest of the gables. Inside one can notice, still preserved, an adorned staircase, a mosaic displaying the date of construction of ("1904–1905") on the main entrance ground floor, as well as a symbolic representation of a snake wrapped around agricultural products.

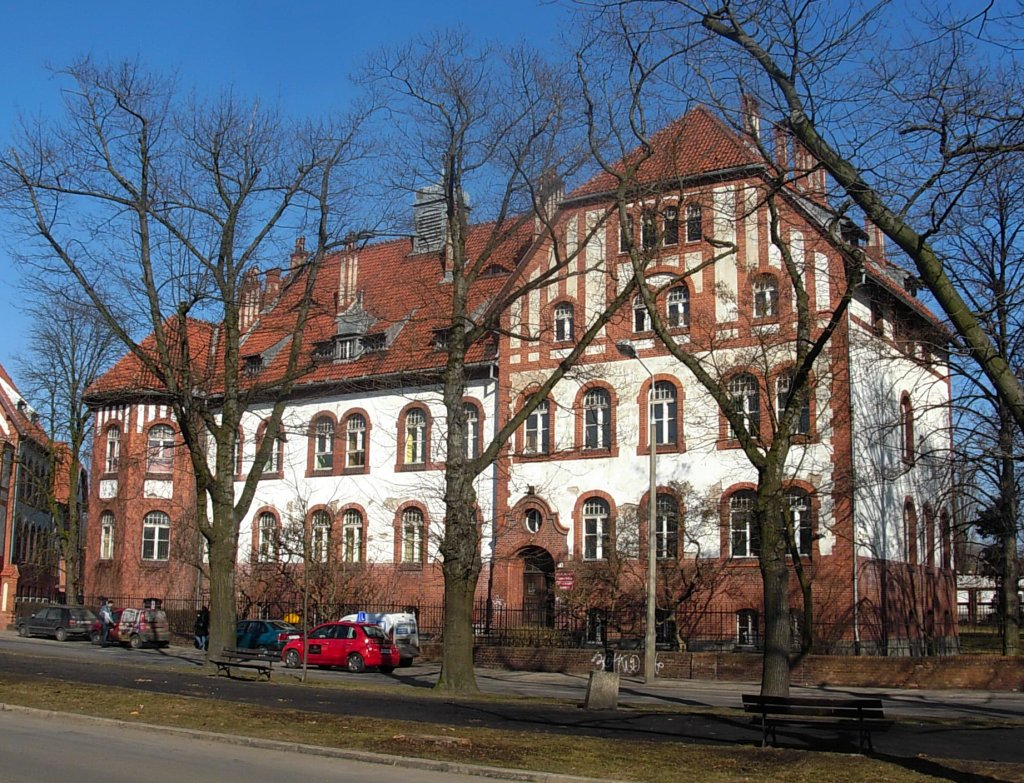
View from Ossoliński Alley

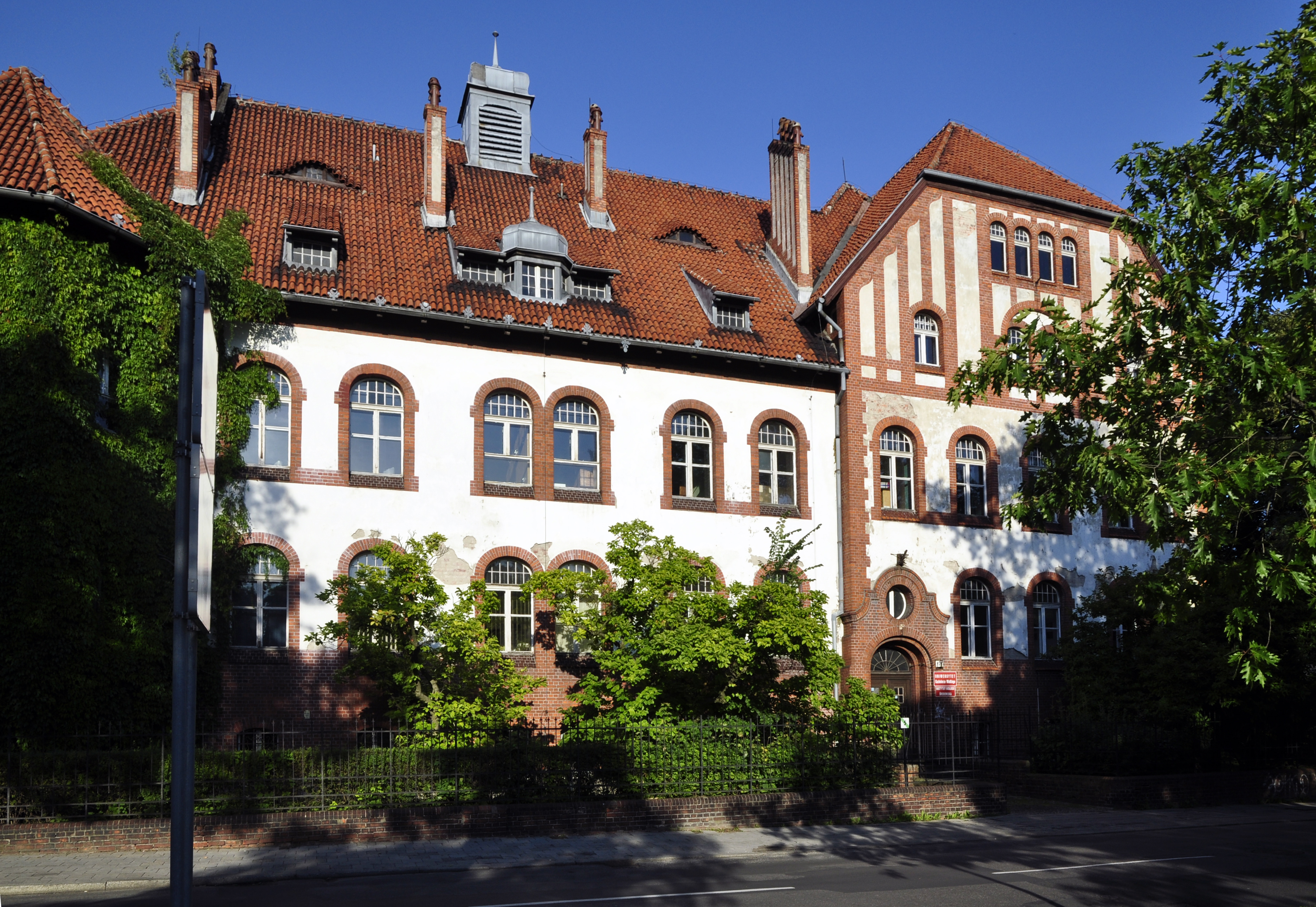
Main frontage

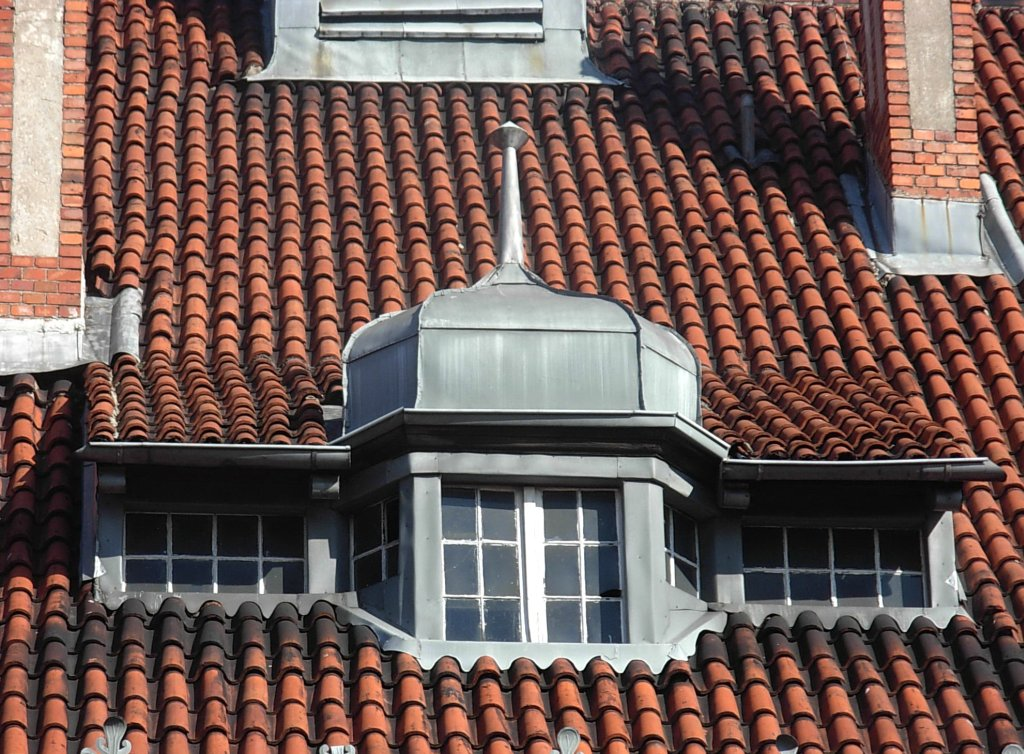
Detail of a dormer, with an onion dome and finial

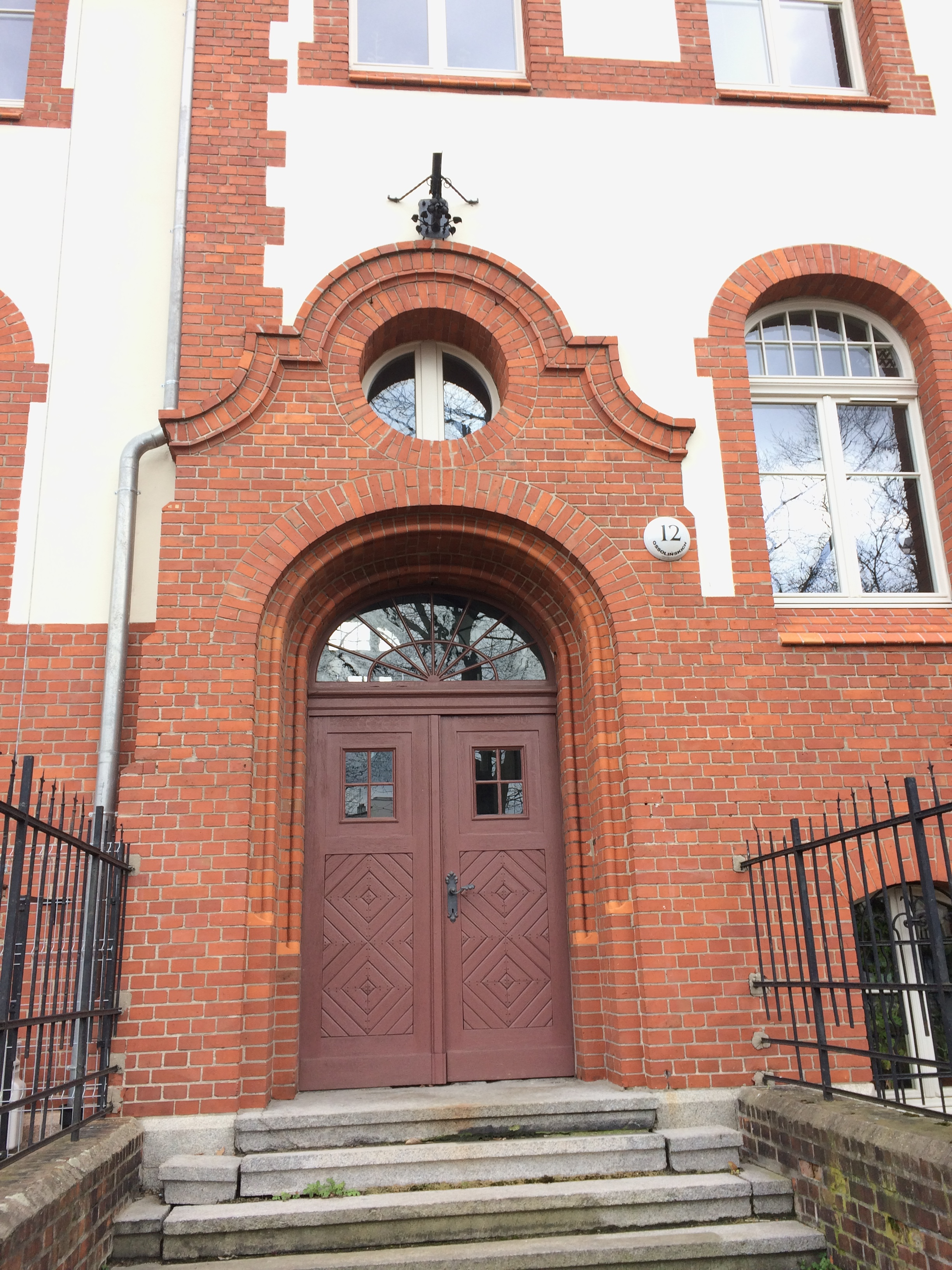
Detail of the portal

=== Building at 2 Powstańców Wielkopolskich Street ===
Registered on Kuyavian-Pomeranian Voivodeship heritage list, Nr.601255, Reg. A/676/1-8, May 20, 1992

The building housed originally the Institute of Animal Hygiene, dealing with animal epidemics, training veterinary physicians and farmers, as well as producing vaccines and antivenoms. The building housed in the basement a service apartment, a boiler room, a cold environment storage room for experimental dissections, incubators, centrifuges, a small stove and a sterilization room. The ground floor was equipped with a lecture room, an operating room, a chemistry laboratory, a weight room, a laboratory for assistants, and an aseptic room. On the first floor were a library, a darkroom for macro- and microphotography and two apartments for assistants. The attic area was split into warehouses. Today, it hosts UKW Faculty of Pedagogy and Psychology.

The edifice has a well proportional body with a middle avant-corps at the center of the elevation. Openings display round topped shape. The Monk and Nun tiled gable is regularly pierced with dormers and chimneys, overlooked by a middle pinnacle. Inside, a preserved staircase with a wrought iron balustrade boasts a neo-baroque decoration.

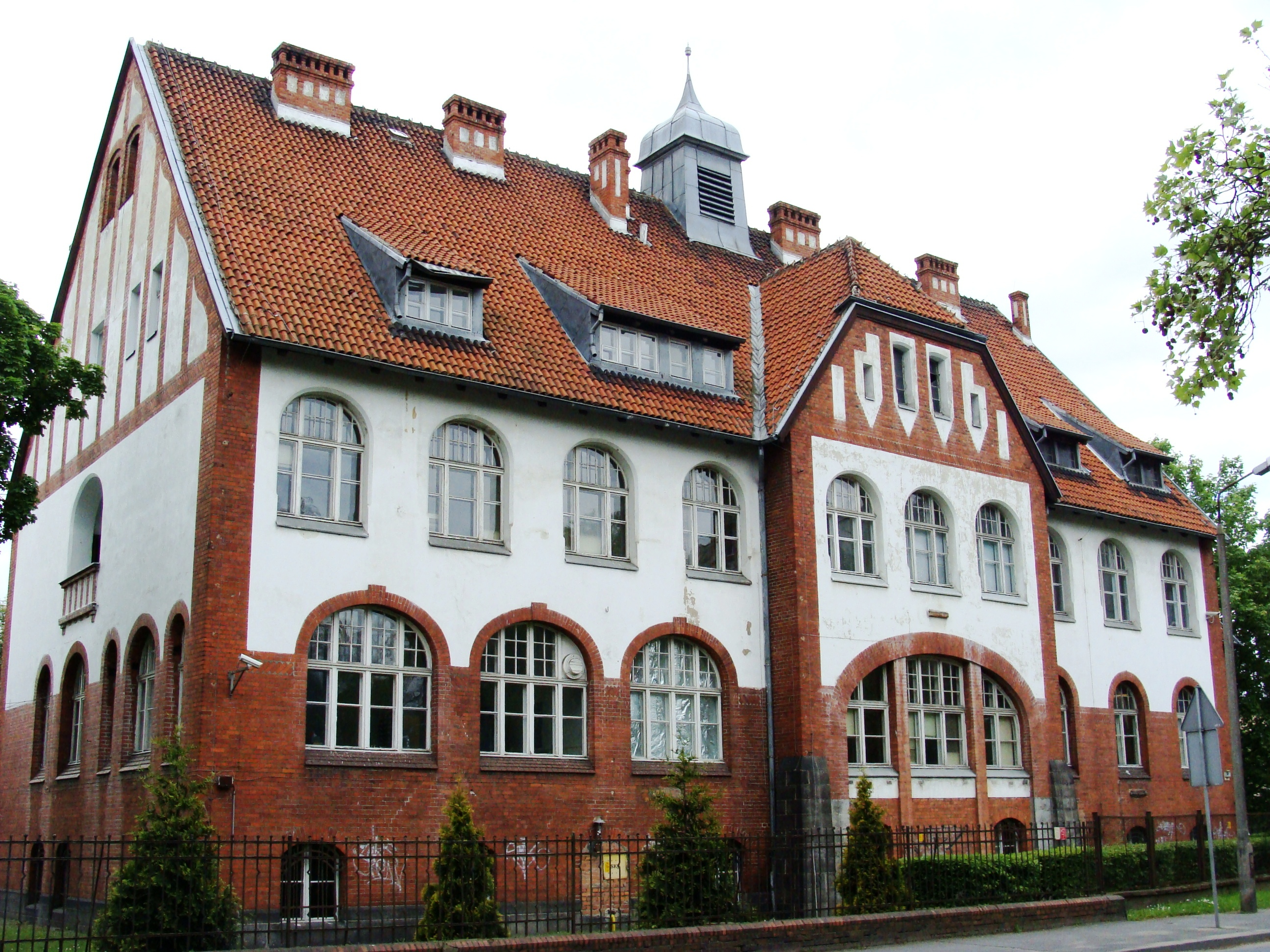
Street frontage

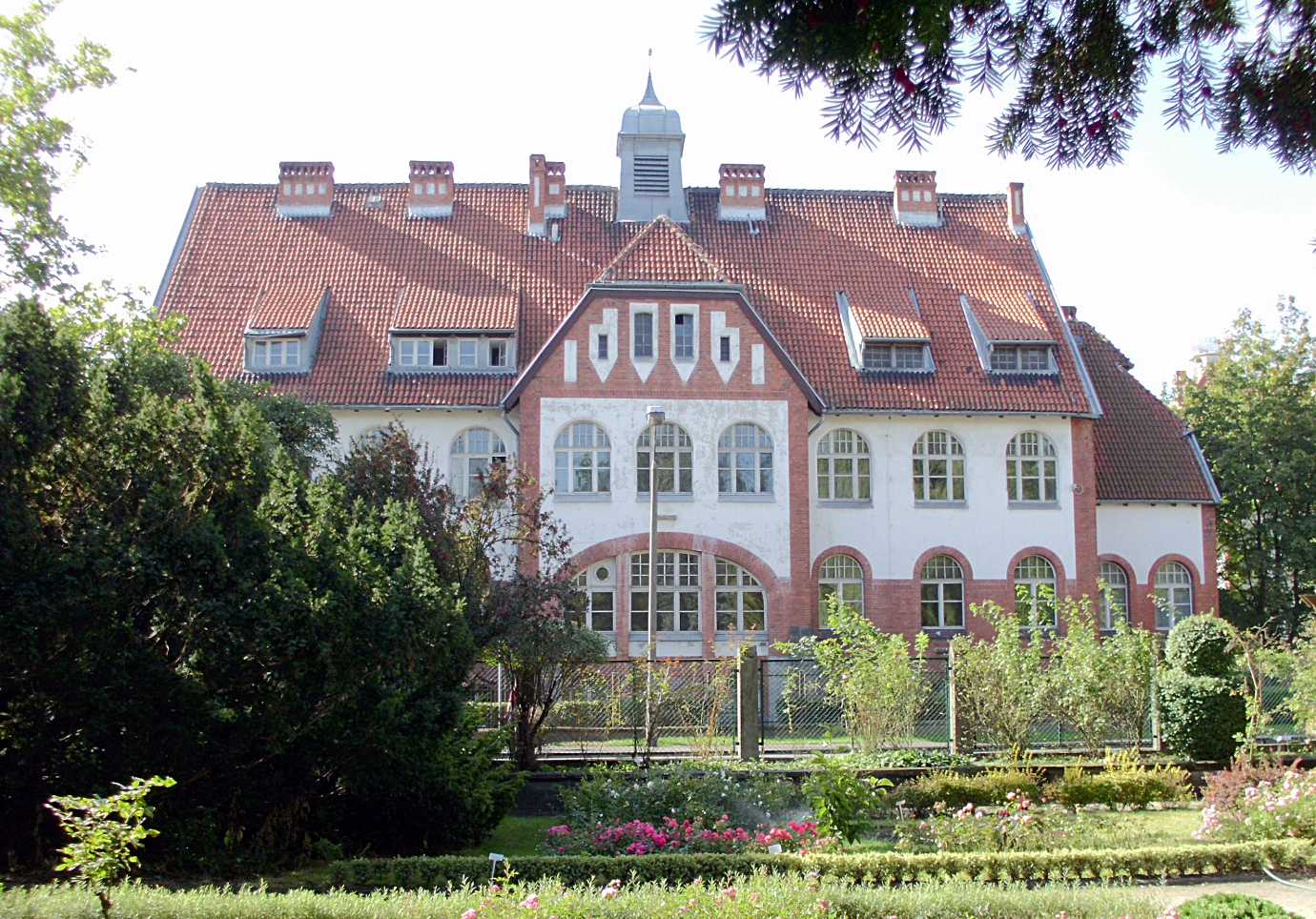
Opposite View

=== Habitation house, 4 Powstańców Wielkopolskich Street ===
Registered on Kuyavian-Pomeranian Voivodeship heritage list, Nr.601257, Reg.A/676/1-8, May 20, 1992.

The house was dedicated for accommodating the head gardener and the chief accountant. It has three levels and has been later divided into smaller accommodations.

Characteristics of eclecticism and historicism style, the edifice exhibits a small avant-corps that stands out like a turret. Facades mix various material, from different bricks, to plaster and timber framing. Attics are pierced with dormers, gables topped by finials.

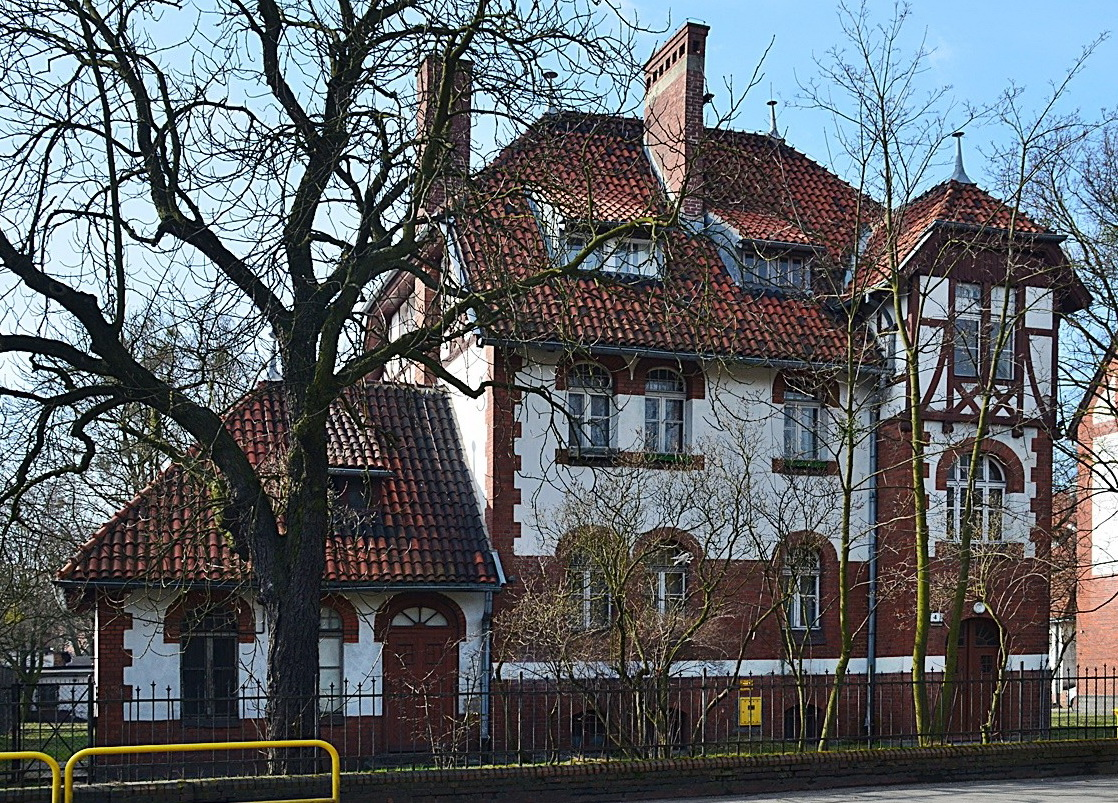
Main view from Powstańców Wielkopolskich Street

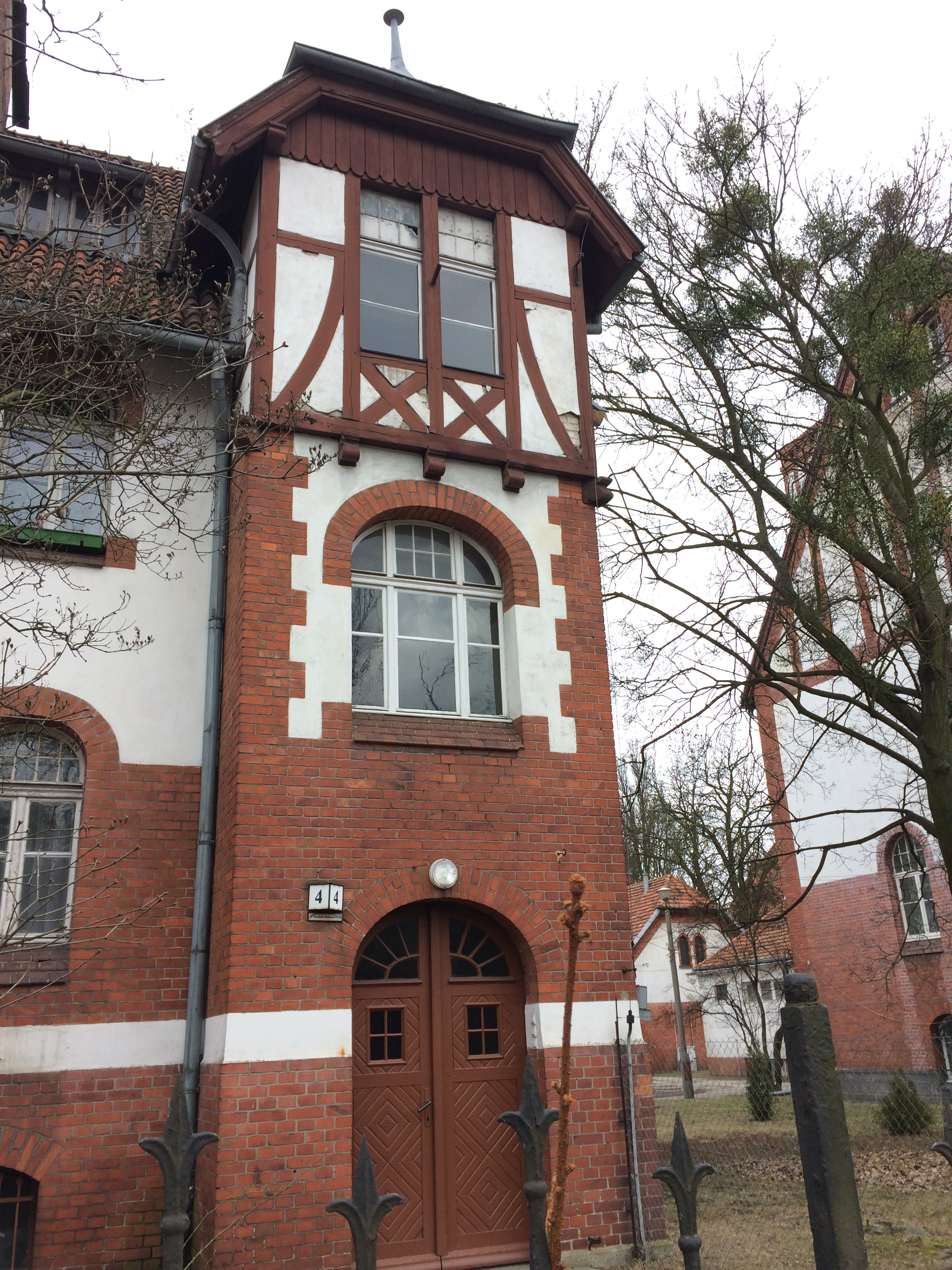
Avant-corps

=== Other buildings ===
In the depths of the inner courtyard there are more buildings, mainly dedicated for animal farming and breeding. The architecture reminds the character of the Institute building ensemble, but in a more economical way, without detailed decoration.

- Former piggery, registered on Kuyavian-Pomeranian Voivodeship heritage list

Associated with the Institute of Animal Hygiene, it has been built in the back of the institute edifice. It used to shelter pigs and sheep, segregating sick and healthy animals. Today, the building still has its preserved interior layout. It also served as an administrative building.

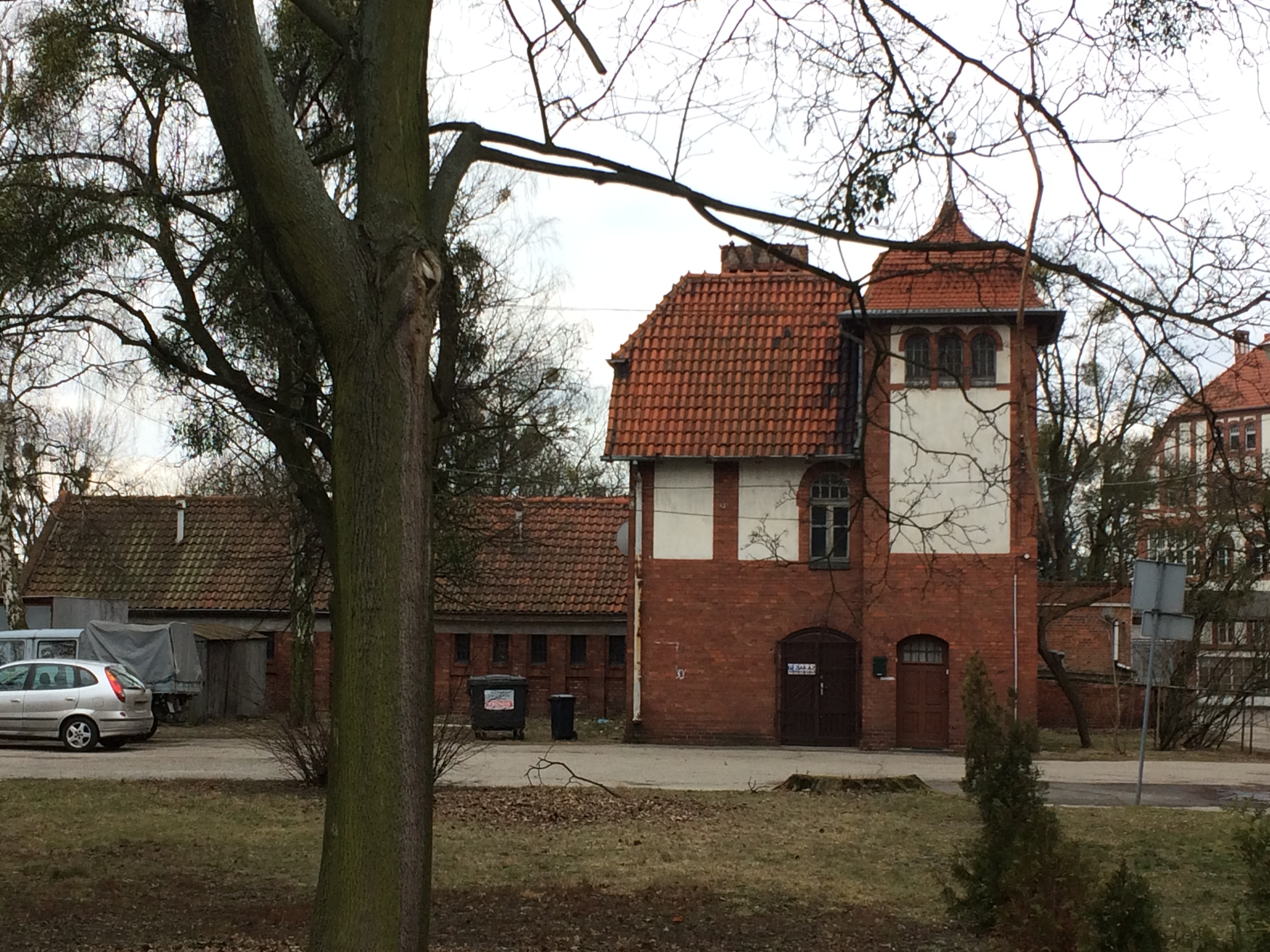
Former piggery
- Former stable, registered on Kuyavian-Pomeranian Voivodeship heritage list

Associated with the Institute of Animal Hygiene, it has been built in the back of the institute edifice. It used to shelter horses and cattle, with a segregation between sick and healthy animals. Today, the house still possess its preserved interior layout (e.g. brick boxes, glazed ceramic). It also served as a slaughterhouse.

- Green area, tree planted, registered on Kuyavian-Pomeranian Voivodeship heritage list

On the plot stands two greenhouses: they belonged to the Institute of Agrochemical and Bacteriology, and the Institutes of Plant Pathology. They were rather advanced construction for the time, with glass roof reinforced with wire, a heating system using tubes running alongside walls and a roof shape preventing the snow to accumulate. The area has been planted originally with various tree species (oaks, beeches, chestnuts, maples, spruces).

- Seat of the Institute of Plant Breeding and Acclimatization, (Polish: Instytut Hodowli i Aklimatyzacji Roślin, IHAR), at 10 Powstańców Wielkopolskich Street

Recent building, with modern architecture features, it has been erected in the second half of the 20th century. The edifice hosts, among others, UKW Institute of Experimental Biology (Departments of Genetics, Biochemistry & Cell Biology, Biotechnology, Physiology & Toxicology and Microbiology), and the Provincial Veterinary Inspectorate.

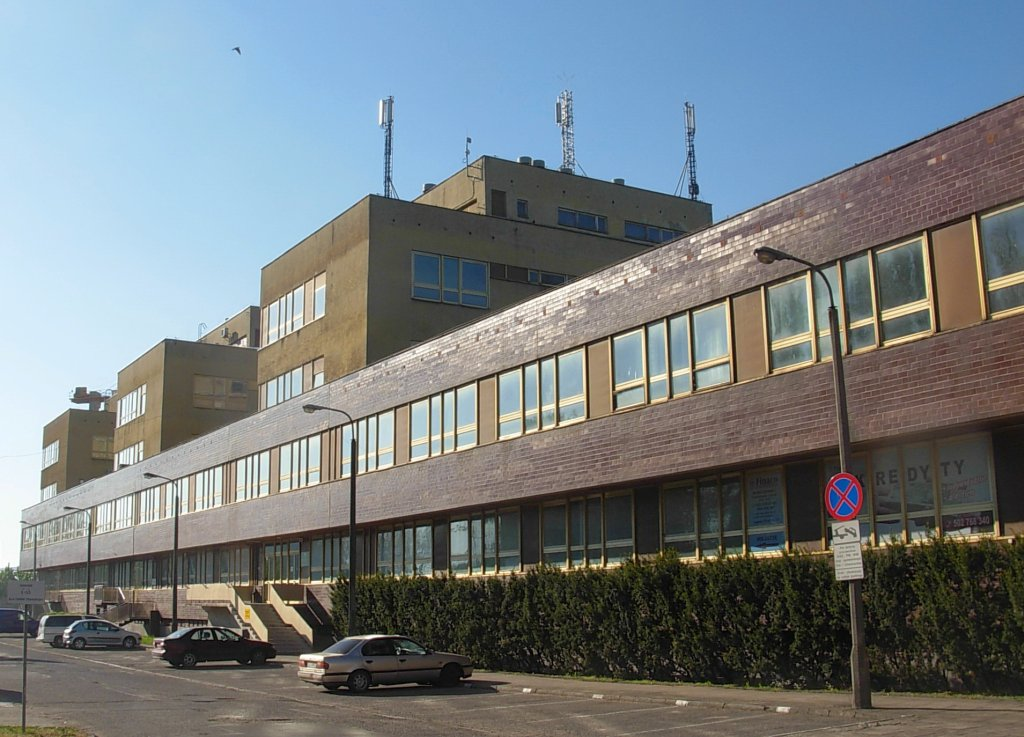
General view from Powstańców Wielkopolskich Street

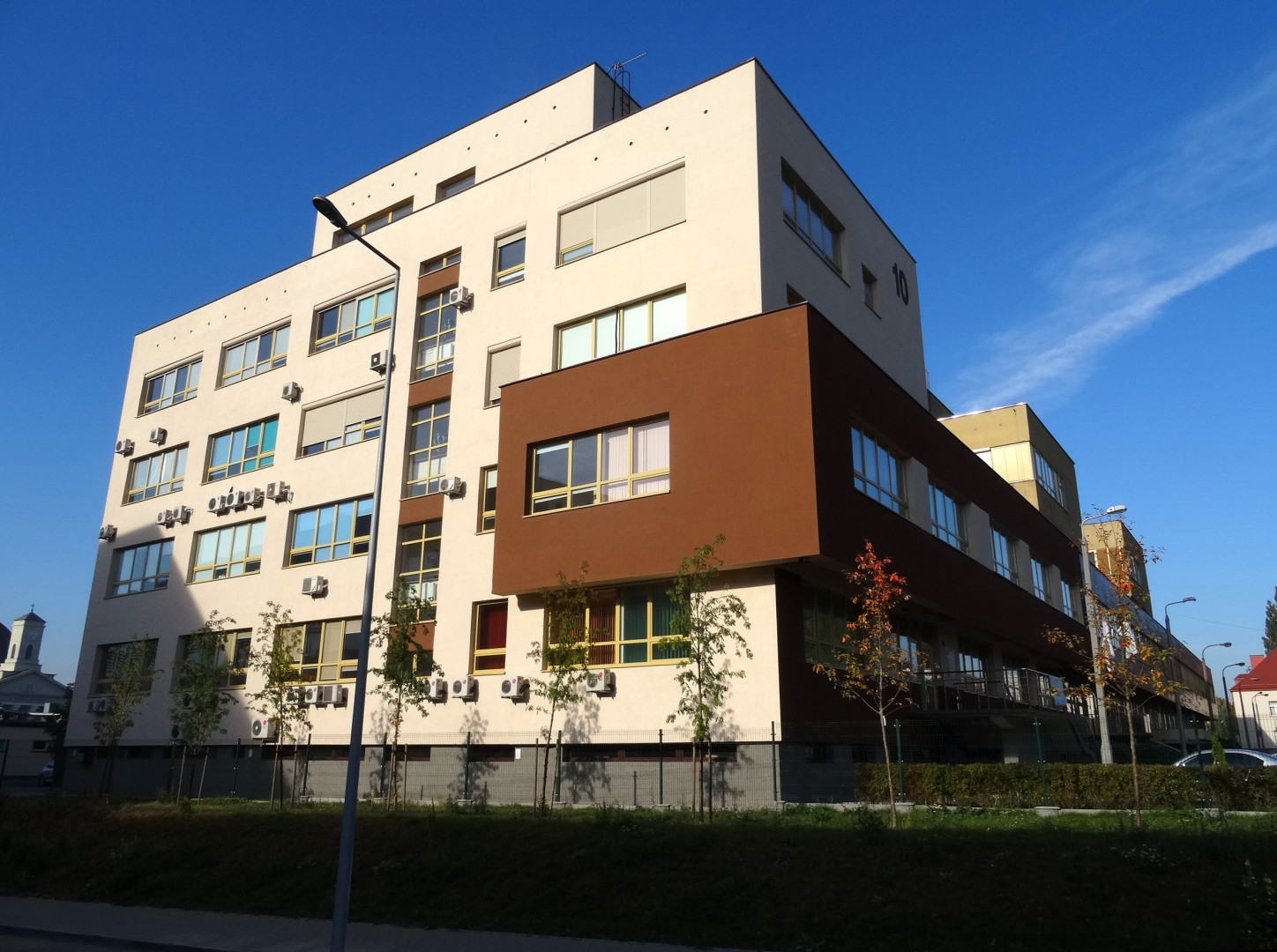
Western wing
- Regional agrochemical station in Bydgoszcz, at 6 Powstańców Wielkopolskich Street
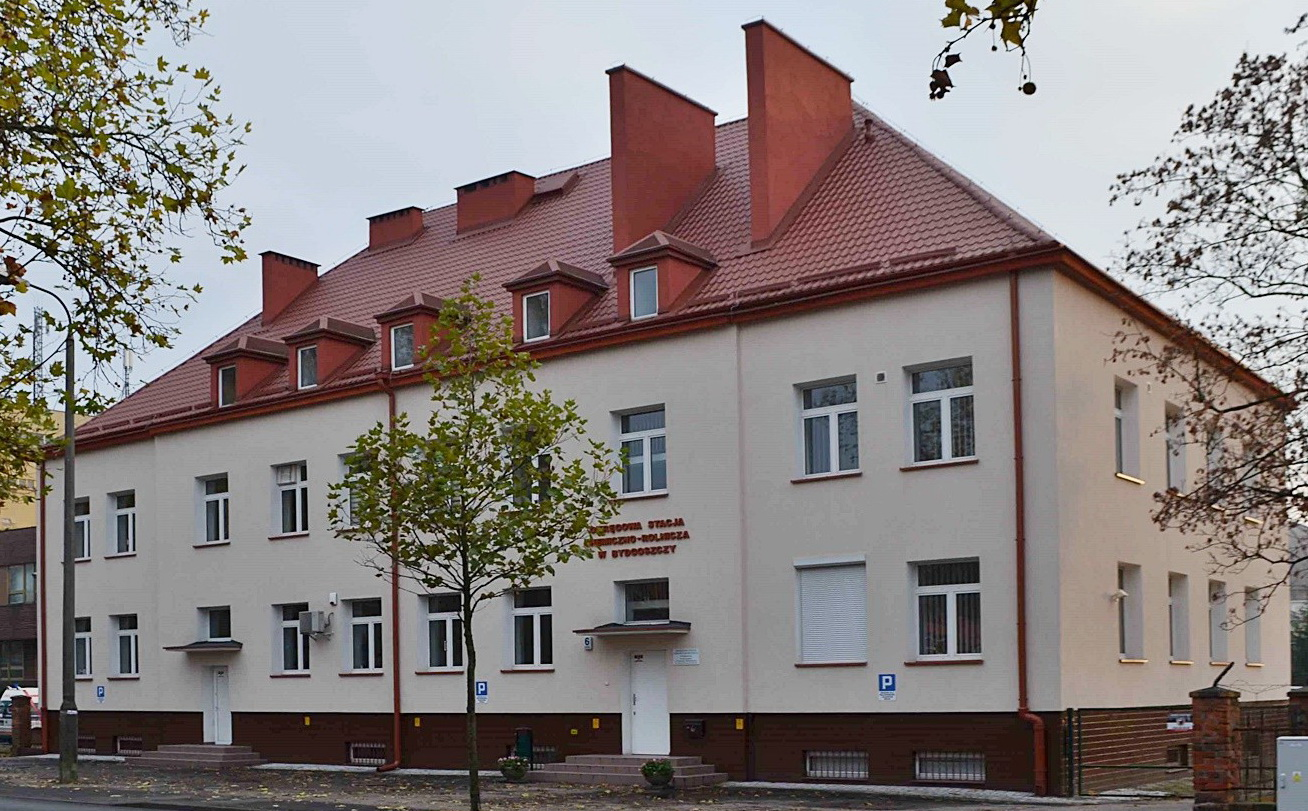
Main building

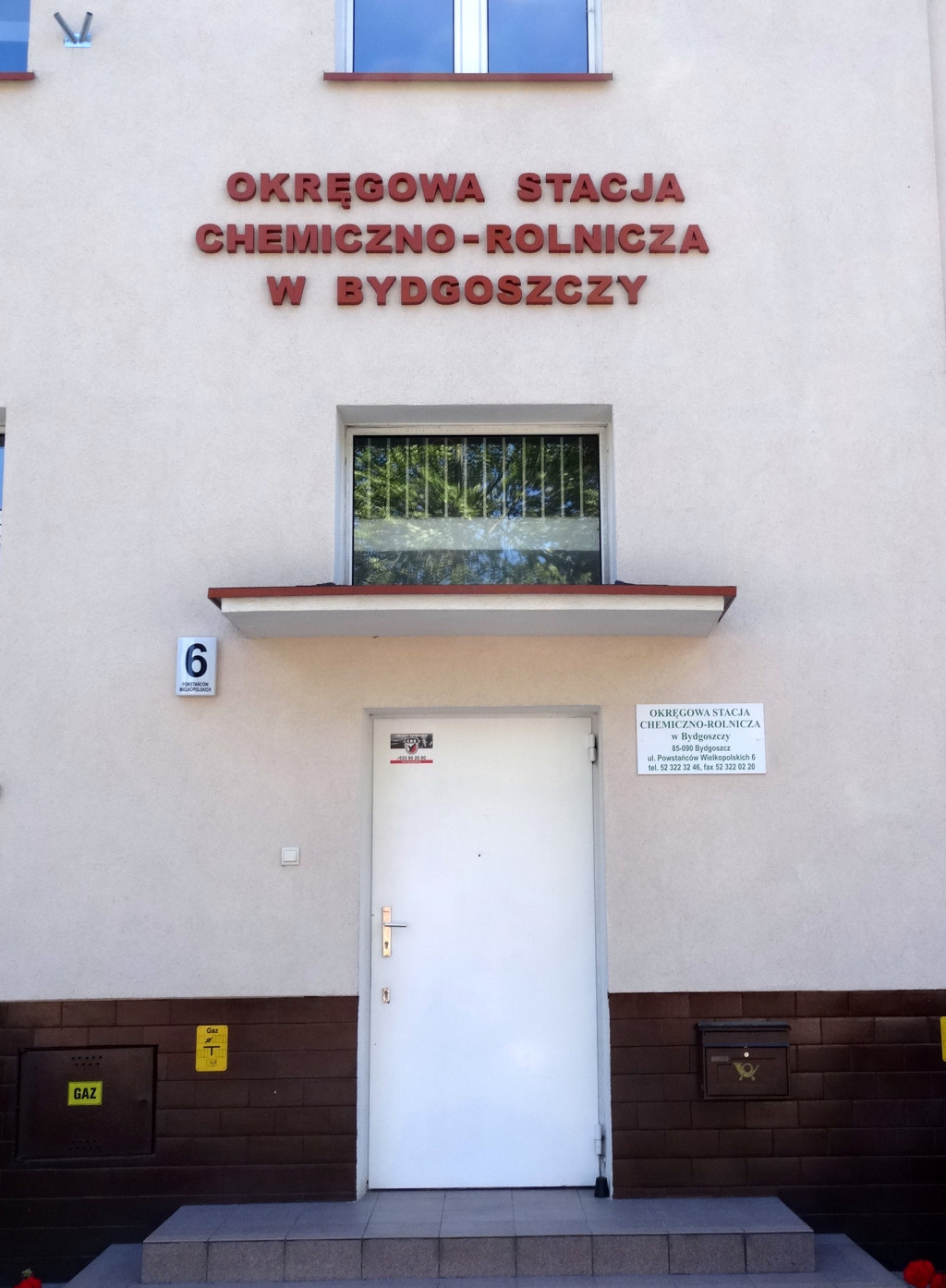
Frontage

== Bibliography ==
- Grzybowska Maria, Werterowska Zofia (1999). Przyczynki do historii architektury zespołu naukowych Instytutów Rolniczych w Bydgoszczy. Materiały do Dziejów Kultury i Sztuki Bydgoszczy i Regionu, zeszyt 4 (in Polish). Bydgoszcz: Pracownia Dokumentacji i Popularyzacji Zabytków Wojewódzkiego Ośrodka Kultury w Bydgoszczy. pp. 60–71.
- Kwaśniewska Krystyna, Rak Mieczysław (1997). Szkolnictwo wyższe w Bydgoszczy. Naukowcy Bydgoszczy – słownik biograficzny (in Polish). Bydgoszcz: Instytut Wydawniczy "Świadectwo". ISBN 8385860487.
- Parucka, Krystyna (2008). Zabytki Bydgoszczy – minikatalog (in Polish). Bydgoszcz: "Tifen" Krystyna Parucka. ISBN 9788392719106.
- Umiński, Janusz (1996). Bydgoszcz. Przewodnik (in Polish). Bydgoszcz: Regionalny Oddział PTTK "Szlak Brdy". ISBN 9788321725239.
- Rasmus, Hugo (1998). O badaniach rolniczych w Bydgoszczy. Prace Komisji Historii Bydgoskiego Towarzystwa Naukowego. Tom 16 (in Polish). Bydgoszcz: Bydgoszcz jako ośrodek administracyjny na przestrzeni wieków.
