= Zaleski =

Zaleski (feminine: Zaleska) is a Polish and Ukrainian (Залеський) toponymic surname related to any of the places named Zalesie. Outside Poland it could have been changed to "Zalesky". It is associated with several Polish noble families. Variant: Załęski/Załęska. The Germanized form is Saleski

Notable people with the surname include:

== Zaleski ==
- Alan Zaleski (1942–2025), American politician in Ohio
- Alexander M. Zaleski (1906–1975), U.S. Catholic Bishop
- Anthony Florian Zaleski (1913–1997), American two-time world middleweight boxing champion
- August Zaleski (1883–1972), Polish diplomat, historian, President of Poland in Exile
- Bronisław Zaleski (1819 or 1820–1880), Polish writer
- Carol Zaleski, American author, professor of religious studies
- Jan Zaleski (1869–1932), Polish biochemist
- Jan Zaleski (philologist) (1926–1981), Polish philologist, historian of language, numismatist
- Jerod Zaleski (born 1989), Canadian football player
- Józef Bohdan Zaleski (1802–1886), Polish poet
- Krzysztof Zaleski (1948–2008), Polish actor
- Ladislaus Michael Zaleski (1852–1925), Polish prelate, Apostolic Delegate to the East-Indies and Latin Patriarch of Antioch, botanist
- Leon Zaleski (c. 1810–1841), Polish patriotic activist
- Marcin Zaleski (1796–1877), Polish painter
- Michał Zaleski (born 1952), Polish politician
- Philip Zaleski, American writer and editor
- Terence M. Zaleski (born 1953), American politician
- Wacław Michał Zaleski (pseudonym Wacław from Olesko; 1799–1849), Polish poet, researcher of folklore
- Wojciech Zaleski (1906–1961), Polish politician
- Zbigniew Zaleski (1947–2019), Polish politician
- Zygmunt Zaleski (1882–1967), Polish literature historian, poet

== Zaleska ==
- Larissa Zaleska Onyshkevych
- Małgorzata Zaleska
- Maria Julia Zaleska

== Załęski ==
- Edmund Załęski (1863–1932), Polish chemist, agrotechnician, and plant breeder
- Stanisław Załęski (1843–1908), Polish priest and historian

== Saleski ==
- Gdal Saleski (1888–1966), American cellist, composer and publicist of Russian origin
- Don Saleski, Canadian professional ice hockey player

== See also ==
- Zalejski
- Fran Saleški Finžgar
- Zaleski, Ohio, village in the United States
- Zalesky
- Zalessky
- Záleský
- Zalewski
- Zales
