= Zalewski =

Zalewski (feminine: Zalewska) is a Polish-language toponymic surname derived from the place names such as Zalewo, Zalewsze, or Zalew. It may also be a hypercorrection of the surname Zaleski.

The Germanised version of this surname is Salewski, usually found in the Silesia region.

Notable people with the surname include:

- Anna Zalewska (born 1965), Polish politician
- Aran Zalewski (born 1991), Australian field hockey player
- Bianka Zalewska
- Dorota Zalewska
- Frank Salewski (born 1967), German teacher and writer
- Halina Zalewska (1940 – 19 August 1976) was a Polish-born Italian actress
- Karol Zalewski (born 1993), Polish athlete
- Karolina Zalewska-Gardoni (born 19 March 1984) is a Polish handball player
- Krystian Zalewski (born 1989), Polish athlete
- Ksawery Zalewski, Polish diplomat, part of the Piłsudski's Prometheism government, worker of consulate in French Lille (1925–1926) and Georgian Tbilisi (1926–1936). Later titular consul in Tbilisi.
- Ludwik Zalewski (1954–2025), Polish politician
- Maria Zalewska
- Michał Zalewski (born 1981), Polish "White Hat" Hacker, computer security expert
- Nicola Zalewski, Polish footballer
- Oliwia Zalewska (born 1995), Polish professional pool player
- Zachary Zalewski (born 2009), Polish footballer

== See also ==
- Zaleski
- Zelewski
- Zalevsky
