= Kreis Witkowo =

Coordinates: 52°26′11″N 17°46′27″E

Location of Kreis Witkowo

Kreis Witkowo was a district in Regierungsbezirk Bromberg, in the Prussian province of Posen, from 1887 to 1919.

== Demographics ==
According to the Prussian census of 1905, the district had a population of 27,784, of which 84% were Poles and 16% were Germans. The majority of German residents left the district after 1918.

== Court system ==
The main court (German: Landgericht) was in Gnesen, with lower courts (German: Amtsgericht) in Gnesen and Witkowo.
