= Jan Zaleski =

Polish biochemist

- Born: 8 March 1869; Kalwaria, Congress Poland
- Died: 22 August 1932 (aged 63); Warsaw, Republic of Poland
- Known for: Contributions to the field of blood chemistry
- Scientific career
- Fields: Biochemistry
- Institutions: Agrarian University of Dublany; Medical Institute for Women; PetrogradWarsaw University

Jan Zaleski (born 8 March 1869 in Kalwaria near Augustów (modern-day Lithuania), in the Russian Empire; died 22 August 1932 in Warsaw, Republic of Poland) was a Polish biochemist who made significant contributions to the understanding of blood chemistry.

== Career ==
From 1904–1907, Zaleski was a lecturer at the Agrarian University of Dublany, near Lviv. From 1907–1918, Zaleski worked at the Medical Institute for Women in Petrograd, starting out as a laboratory assistant and becoming Professor of General and Organic Chemistry in 1916. From 1922 until his death in 1932, Zaleski was Professor of Pharmaceutical Chemistry and Toxicology at Warsaw University. He became a member of the Polish Academy of Learning in 1921.

== Research ==
Between 1895 and 1901, Zaleski conducted research with Marceli Nencki on the ammonia content of blood and on conversions of blood pigments. In 1907, Zaleski published an empirical formula of mesoporphyrin. In 1924, he co-authored with Kazimierz Lindenfeld a method to obtain hemin.
