= Lviv National Environmental University =

Agricultural university in Lviv, Ukraine

Coordinates: 49.9000°N 24.0920°E

- ДЗВО «Льві́вський націона́льний університе́т природокористува́ння»
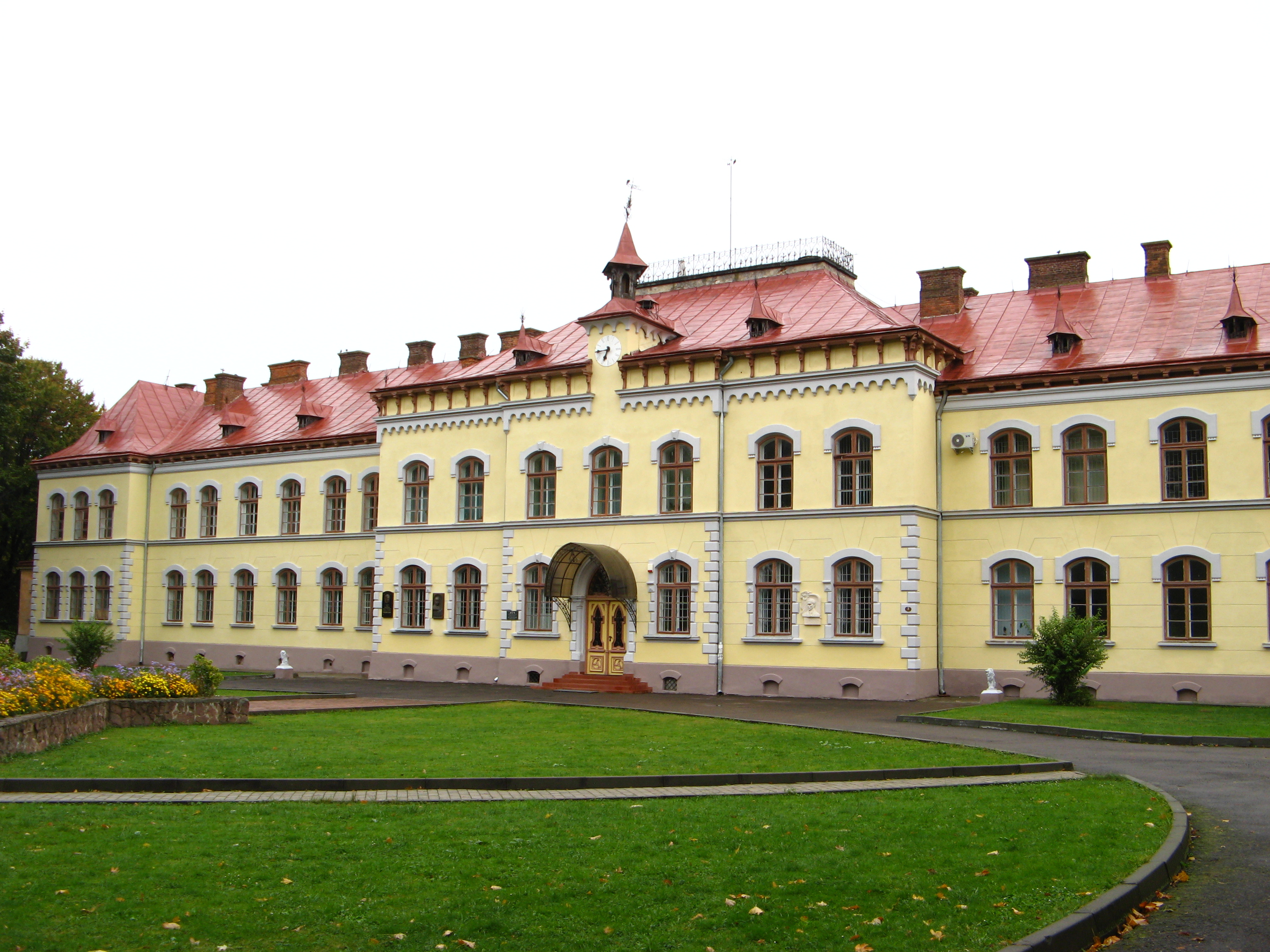
- Motto: Carpent tua Poma Nepotes
- Established: 9 January 1856
- Campus: Suburban
- Affiliations: Ministry of Education and Science of Ukraine

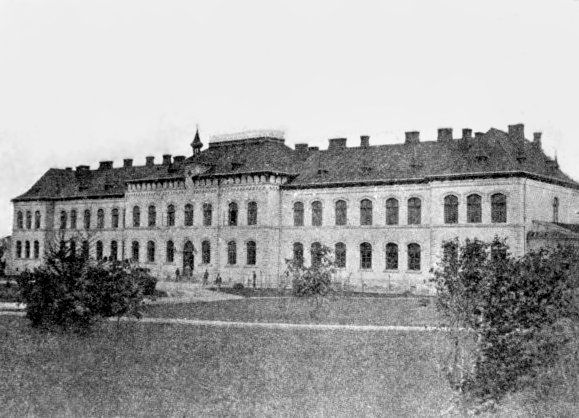
Complex of the academy, early 20th century

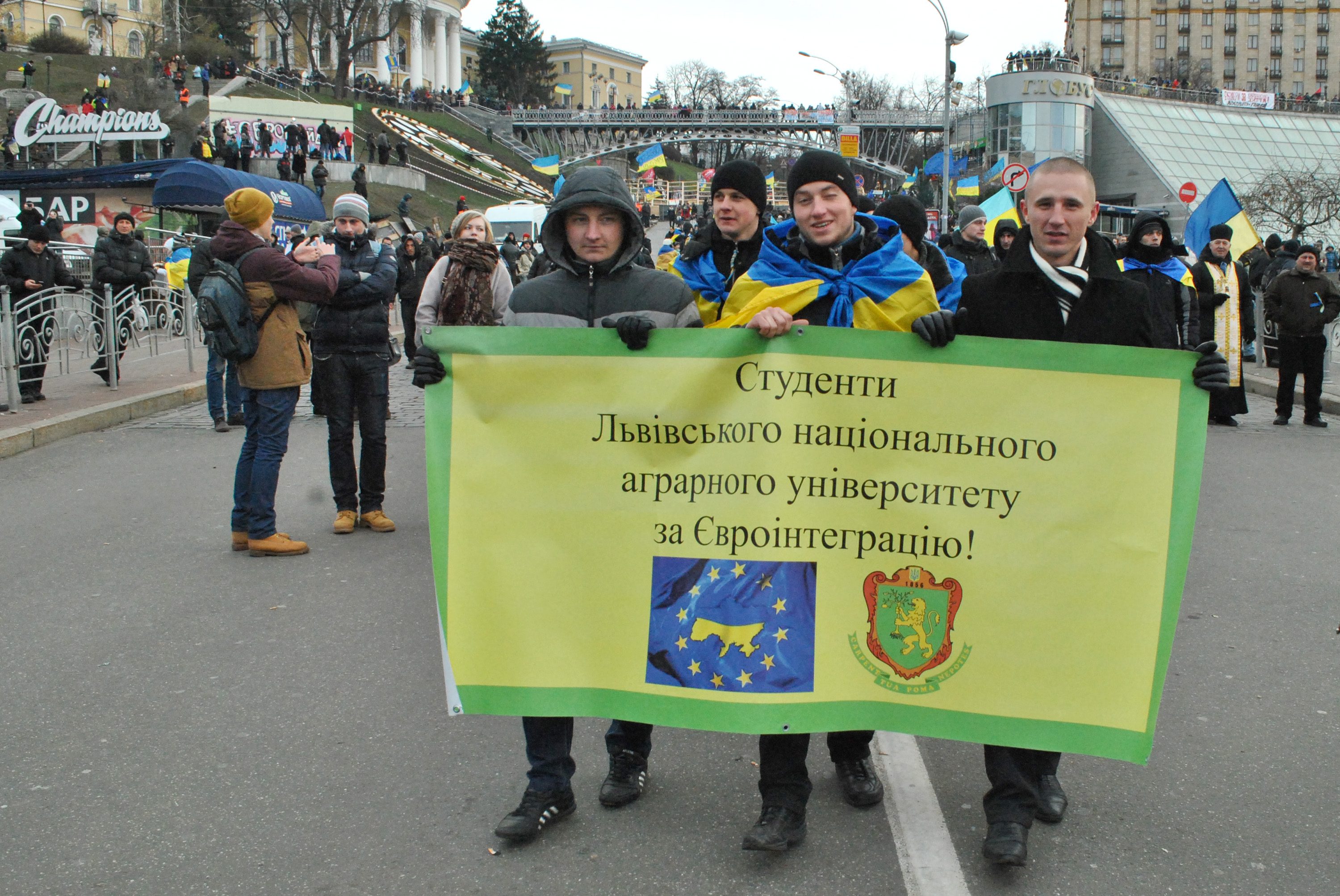
LNAU students at the Euromaidan

The Lviv National Environmental University (Ukrainian: Львівський національний університет природокористування, ЛНУП) is a Ukrainian university in Dubliany near Lviv.

== History ==
It was established as an agricultural academy in Dubliany and was one of the first Polish language schools of this kind. Its history dates back to 1852, when a farm in the village of Dubliany (eight kilometers from the outskirts of Lviv) was purchased by the Galicia Agricultural Society. Four years later, a private School of Village Agriculture was opened there and in 1858, the school was turned into the Agricultural College, with Leon Sapieha being the founder. In 1901 the school gained the rights of a university and was financed by the Galician authorities. However, it never received permission to issue doctorate degree, issuing only the agronomist diplomas. During the Polish–Ukrainian War, the academy's campus was destroyed and as a result, it was moved to Lwów, where in 1919 it was merged with the Lwów Polytechnic, creating Agricultural and Forestry Department.

At the beginning of the 20th century, the campus consisted of two buildings, the main one constructed in 1888 and the laboratory complex, opened in 1900. Before World War I, it had around 1500 students, most of them from Congress Poland. Among its professors were such names as Stefan Dąb-Biernacki, Edmund Załęski, Juliusz Au and Wladyslaw Tyniecki. Its most famous graduates include Stefan Alexandrowicz, Adam Brzechwa-Ajdukiewicz and Wlodzimierz Puchalski.

In 2021 Lviv National Agrarian University was renamed into Lviv National Environmental University.

On January 1, 2024, significantly damaged due to a Russian drone attack.

== See also ==
List of universities in Ukraine
