= Zalevsky =

Zalevsky, Zalevskyi, Zalevski is a surname, a variant of Zalewski. Notable people with the surname include:

- Filip Zalevski (born 3 January 1984) is a Ukrainian pair skater
- Nicholas Zalevsky, Ukrainian and American figurative painter
- Vladyslav Zalevskyi (born 19 September 1998) is a Ukrainian handball player
- Yakiv Zalevskyi, Ukrainian professional football coach and former player
- Zeev Zalevsky, Israeli professor of engineering and entrepreneur
