= Zalessky =

Zalessky feminine: Zalesskaya is a Russian-language surname, a variant of Zaleski. Notable people with the surname include:

- Ivan Zalessky (1897–1938), Russian ornithologist
- Kirill Zalessky (born 1980), Belarusian politician
- Mikhail Zalessky (1877–1946), Russian paleontologist and paleobotanist

== See also ==
- Zalesky
- Záleský
