= Salewski =

Salewski is a Germanized version of the Polish surname Zalewski. Notable people with the urname include:

- Hans-Jürgen Salewski (born 1956), German football player
- Michael Salewski (1938–2010), German historian
- Paul Salewski, a founder of Doyle Salewski Inc
