= Zalesky =

Zalesky is a surname of multiple origins.

- Belarusian surname Залескi with feminine form Zaleskaya, Залеская.
- Czech surname Záleský, anglicized or spelled without diacritics.
- The Polish surname Zaleski could have been changed to "Zalesky" outside Poland.

Notable people with the surname include:

- Aleksey Zalesky (born 1994), Belarusian footballer
- Donald Zalesky (1962–2015), better known as Curly Moe, Canadian-American professional wrestler
- Jim Zalesky (born 1961), American college wrestling coach

== See also ==
- Zalessky
