= Zelewski =

Zelewski is a German surname. Notable people with the surname include:

- Emil von Zelewski (1854–1891), Imperial German Army officer
- Erich von dem Bach-Zelewski (1899–1972), SS-Obergruppenführer

== See also ==
- Zalewski
- Zelenski
