= Dubliany =

City in Lviv Oblast, Ukraine

Dubliany Дубляни
- City
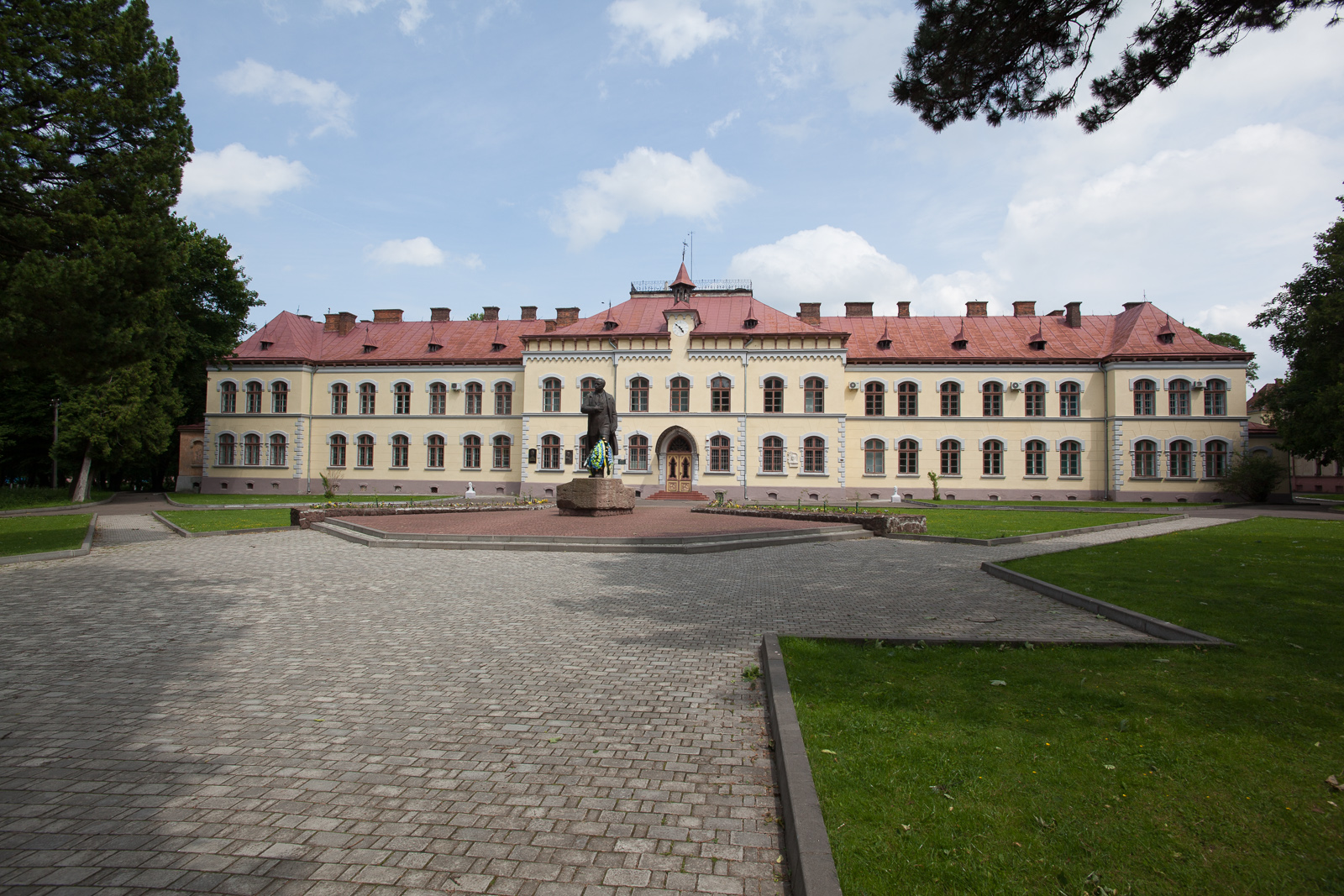
- Lviv National Environmental University

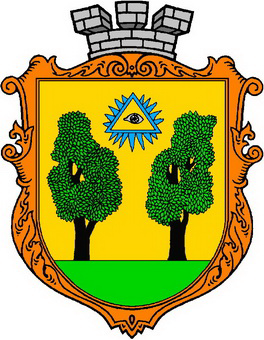
- Flag Coat of arms

- Location within Ukraine Location within Lviv Oblast
- Country: Ukraine
- Oblast: Lviv Oblast
- Raion: Lviv Raion
- Hromada: Lviv urban hromada

Population (2022)
  - Total: 9,748
  - Estimate (2025): 7,957
- Time zone: UTC+2 (EET)
  - Summer (DST): UTC+3 (EEST)

Dubliany (Ukrainian: Дубляни, IPA: [dʊbˈlʲɑnɪ]; Polish: Dublany) is a small city in Lviv Raion, Lviv Oblast (region) of Ukraine and a suburb of Lviv (7 km (4.3 mi) away). It belongs to Lviv urban hromada, one of the hromadas of Ukraine. Population: 9,748 (2022 estimate).

== Name ==
The name of Dubliany is likely related to oak (Ukrainian: дуб - dub) groves located nearby. Depiction of an oak is also present on the city's coat of arms.

== History ==
The first mention of Dubliany comes from 1440.

A local Roman Catholic church that was the first known religious building in village built in 1885–1890, since 1990 has been passed to the Ukrainian Autocephalous Orthodox Church. During the Soviet period the temple was used as a sports gym for the agricultural institute. The first Ukrainian Greek Catholic Church, Dormition of the Theotokos, was built in Dubliany only in 1912 and for long period of time local Greek-Catholic population traveled to the neighboring village (about 2 km) of Malekhiv.

In 1910, in Dubliany was built a train station on a railroad Lviv–Kivertsi (Lwów–Kiwerce).

During the Polish-Ukrainian War, forces of the Ukrainian Galician Army were stationed in Dubliany between November 1918 and April 1919.

After World War II Polish ethnic residents of Dubliany were forced to leave the village, and move to the Recovered Territories (see Polish population transfers (1944–46)). Most of them settled in former German village Drachenbrunn near Wrocław in Silesia. They renamed the village into Dublany (since 1947 — Wojnów, now a district of Wrocław).

In 1967, the village was granted the status of urban type settlement. In 1978, Dubliany was granted the status of city.

Until 18 July 2020, Dubliany belonged to Zhovkva Raion. The raion was abolished in July 2020 as part of the administrative reform of Ukraine, which reduced the number of raions of Lviv Oblast to seven. The area of Zhovkva Raion was merged into Lviv Raion.

In early 2024 the historical building of the university was damaged by a Russian missile strike.

== Points of interest ==
Located in the northern side of Lviv, the city's main landmark is the Agrarian University which was established on 9 January 1856 by the Galician Economic Society. An arboretum was founded on the school's ground in 1892 by botany professor Ignacy Szyszyłowicz. In 1901 the school was awarded the title of academy. During the Second Polish Republic, when the village of Dubliany was part of Lwów Voivodeship, the Agricultural Academy served as the only existing Polish-language agricultural academy. In 1919 it became part of the Lviv Polytechnic as its agrarian and forestry department.

Among lost landmarks there was a cemetery chapel of Jan Alembek, a Polonized German apothecary and trader and who for a long period was a burgomaster (mayor) of Lwów (see Mayor of Lviv). To Alembek is attested the first description of Lviv in the Ukrainian Latin Alphabet.

Dubliany is also known for its traditional craft of Christmas star production.

== Notable people ==
Dubliany is the birthplace of Polish painter Adam Werka, and long jumper Edward Czernik.

Stepan Bandera studied in Dubliany in 1928-1933. A memorial museum dedicated to him functions in the university.

Stepan Turchak, a Ukrainian conductor, lived in Dubliany. A children's art school is named after him in the city.

Anatoliy Zhalovaha, a native of Dubliany, died at the age of 33 during the Revolution of Dignity and was later awarded the title of Hero of Ukraine.
