= Edmund Załęski =

Polish chemist, agrotechnician and plant breeder

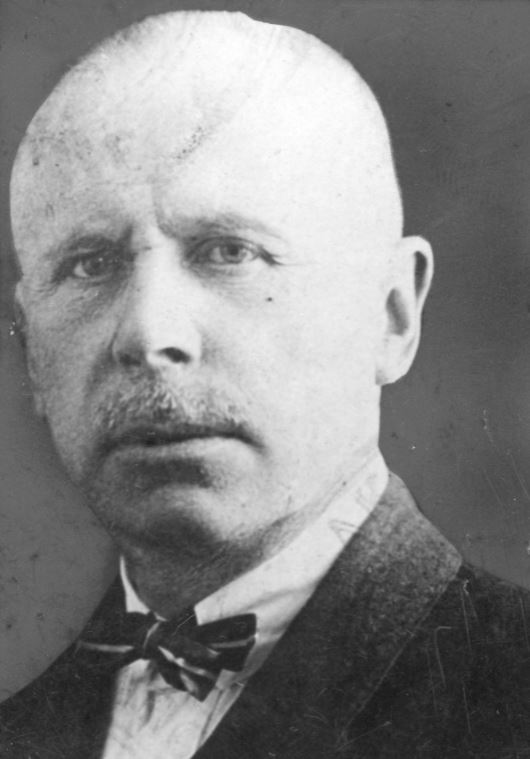
- Born: August 18, 1863; Lemberg, Austria-Hungary
- Died: December 1932 (aged 69); Kraków, Poland
- Known for: Breeding new varieties of wheat and sugar beet
- Scientific career
- Fields: Chemistry, plant biology
- Institutions: Agricultural University of Dublany; Jagiellonian University

Edmund Załęski (18 August 1863 in Lviv (Lemberg), Austria-Hungary – December 1932 in Kraków, Poland) was a Polish chemist, agrotechnician, and plant breeder. He was a professor at the Agricultural University of Dublany, as well as a professor (beginning in 1918) at Jagiellonian University, where he also served as rector from 1930–1931.

Załęski created new, valuable varieties of wheat and sugar beet. His book Metodyka doświadczeń rolniczych (Methodology of agricultural experiments) was published in 1927. Professor Tadeusz Caliński of the Poznań University of Life Sciences credits him with the "first systematic lecture on the methodology of agricultural experiments with some application of probability theory."
