= Záleský =

Záleský (feminine: Záleská) is a Czech surname. Notable people with the surname include:

- Dominik Záleský (born 1995), Czech sprinter and bobsledder
- Jiří Záleský (born 1965), Czech footballer
- Lucie Hochmann née Záleská (born 1991), Czech track cyclist

== See also ==
- Zaleski
- Zalessky
- Zalesky
