= Władysław Tyniecki =

Polish forester and botanist (1833–1912)

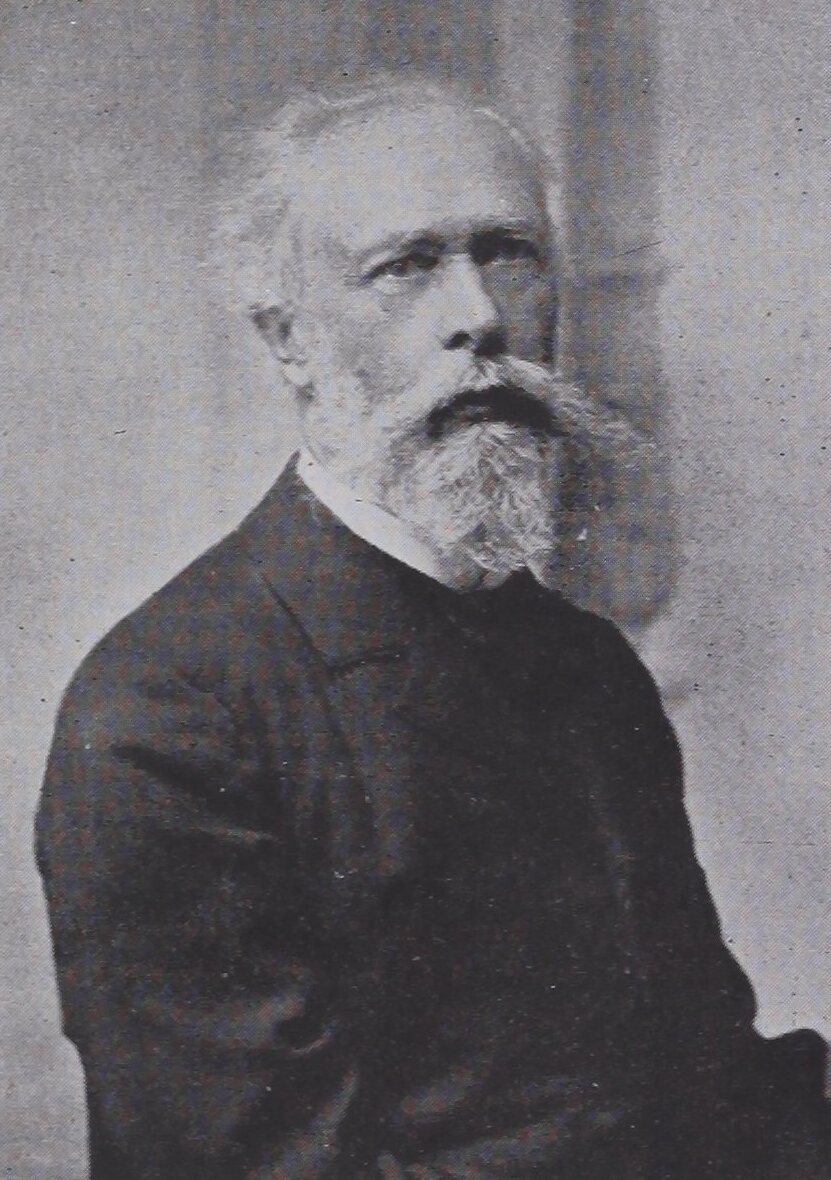

Władysław Tyniecki (5 May 1833 – 16 October 1912) was a Polish forester and botanist who served as a professor at the school of forestry in Lviv. He was the founding editor of the journal Sylwan.

== Life and work ==
Tyniecki was born in Olszanica (Podolia) to Erazm and Salomea née Łazowski. He went to grammar school but political events in 1848-49 stopped study. He was refused entry as a volunteer in General Bem's army for being too young. He then worked on his father's farm. He went to study at the newly created Agricultural Academy in Dublany in 1855. He then studied at the Forest Academy in Tharandt from 1858 to 1860 and returned to become a lecturer at Dublany. He also founded a botanical garden there. In 1874 he moved to teach botany and forestry at the school of forestry in Lviv, succeeding Henryk Strzelecki who resigned, as the head in 1892. He was a founder of the Galician Forest Society and began the journal "Sylwan" which he edited. He also edited the magazine "Rolnik" for the Galician Farming Society. He was a founding member of the Copernicus society of Polish naturalists.

Tyniecki's forestry work included protection measures against cockchafers and moths. He gave lectures on the physiology of trees, discussed the aging and death of trees. In 1867 he was involved in the propagation of willows. In 1898 he wrote a dissertation on cancer diseases in trees. In 1898 he promoted the use of beech wood for railway sleepers. He suggested in 1904 that mixed species forest plantations were preferred to monocultures.
