= Bromberg (region) =

Region of Posen during Prussian and German rule

Coordinates: 52°50′N 17°30′E

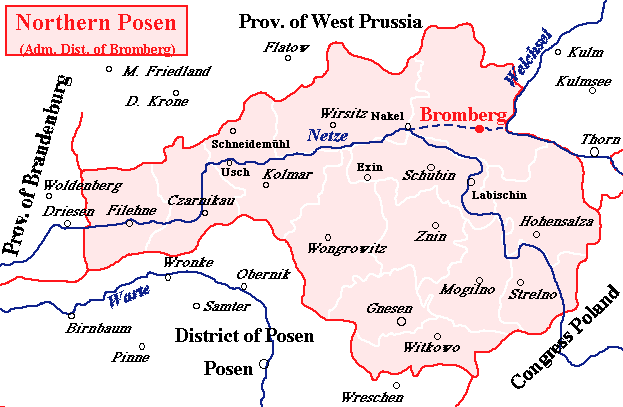
Bromberg Region with its districts and cities

Bromberg was the northern of two Prussian government regions, or Regierungsbezirke (Polish: Rejencja), of the Grand Duchy of Posen (1815–1848) and its successor, the Province of Posen (1848–1919). The administrative center was the city of Bromberg (Bydgoszcz), which is now part of Poland.

The region was bordered on the south by the Regierungsbezirk Posen, to the west by the Province of Brandenburg, to the north by West Prussia, and to the east by Congress Poland (part of the Russian Empire).

The Bromberg region had a larger percentage of mostly Protestant Germans than average for the Province of Posen. Other German speakers were by religion Jewish or Roman Catholic. However, around half the population were Roman Catholic Poles. Initially, there was a sizable Jewish minority, but that number diminished over time due to the Ostflucht.

== Divisions ==
Note: Prussian provinces were subdivided into units called Kreise (singular Kreis, abbreviated Kr., English "circle"), which were similar to small counties in US terms, "rural districts" in British terms. The larger cities would have their own Stadtkreis (English: "urban district") and the surrounding rural area would be named for the city, but referred to as a Landkreis (English: "rural district"). In the case of Posen, the Landkreis was split into two: Landkreis Posen West, and Landkreis Posen East. The region was originally divided into several larger Kreise, which were later divided into the final 13 Kreise, the larger ones spinning off smaller units.

== Demographics ==
Ethnolinguistic structure in the Bromberg Region (1910)
District	Polish Name	Population	German	%	Polish	%	Bilingual	%
City of Bromberg	Bydgoszcz	57,696	46,720	81.0%	9,350	16.2%	1,557	2.7%
Bromberg	Bydgoszcz	96,473	58,783	60.9%	37,049	38.4%	590	0.6%
Czarnikau	Czarnków	42,287	30,016	71.0%	12,027	28.4%	179	0.4%
Filehne	Wieleń	33,653	23,504	69.8%	9,918	29.5%	217	0.6%
Gnesen	Gniezno	56,250	21,461	38.2%	34,643	61.6%	129	0.2%
Hohensalza	Inowrocław	77,294	28,394	36.7%	48,599	62.9%	258	0.3%
Kolmar in Posen	Chodzież	76,020	61,600	81.0%	13,957	18.4%	427	0.6%
Mogilno	Mogilno	49,253	14,274	29.0%	34,659	70.4%	194	0.4%
Schubin	Szubin	48,304	21,035	43.5%	26,799	55.5%	403	0.8%
Strelno	Strzelno	37,620	7,437	19.8%	30,109	80.0%	67	0.2%
Wirsitz	Wyrzysk	67,219	34,235	50.9%	32,446	48.3%	495	0.7%
Witkowo	Witkowo	29,094	4,814	16.5%	24,164	83.1%	91	0.3%
Wongrowitz	Wągrowiec	52,574	16,309	31.0%	35,955	68.4%	216	0.4%
Znin	Żnin	40,210	10,906	27.1%	29,156	72.5%	133	0.3%
Total	-	763,947	379,488	49.7%	378,831	49.6%	4,956	0.6%

Demographic evolution of the Bromberg region (1831–1910)
Year	Population	German	%	Polish / Bilingual	%
1831	323,756	167,784	51.8%	154,902	47.8%
1860	493,655	250,967	50.8%	242,687	49.2%
1890	625,051	309,756	49.6%	315,042	50.4%
1900	689,023	332,921	48.3%	355,893	51.7%
1905	723,965	354,714	49.0%	368,690	50.9%
1910	763,947	379,488	49.7%	383,787	50.2%

== See also ==
- Netze District
- Bydgoszcz District
- Bydgoszcz Department
