= Sikorowo =

- Village
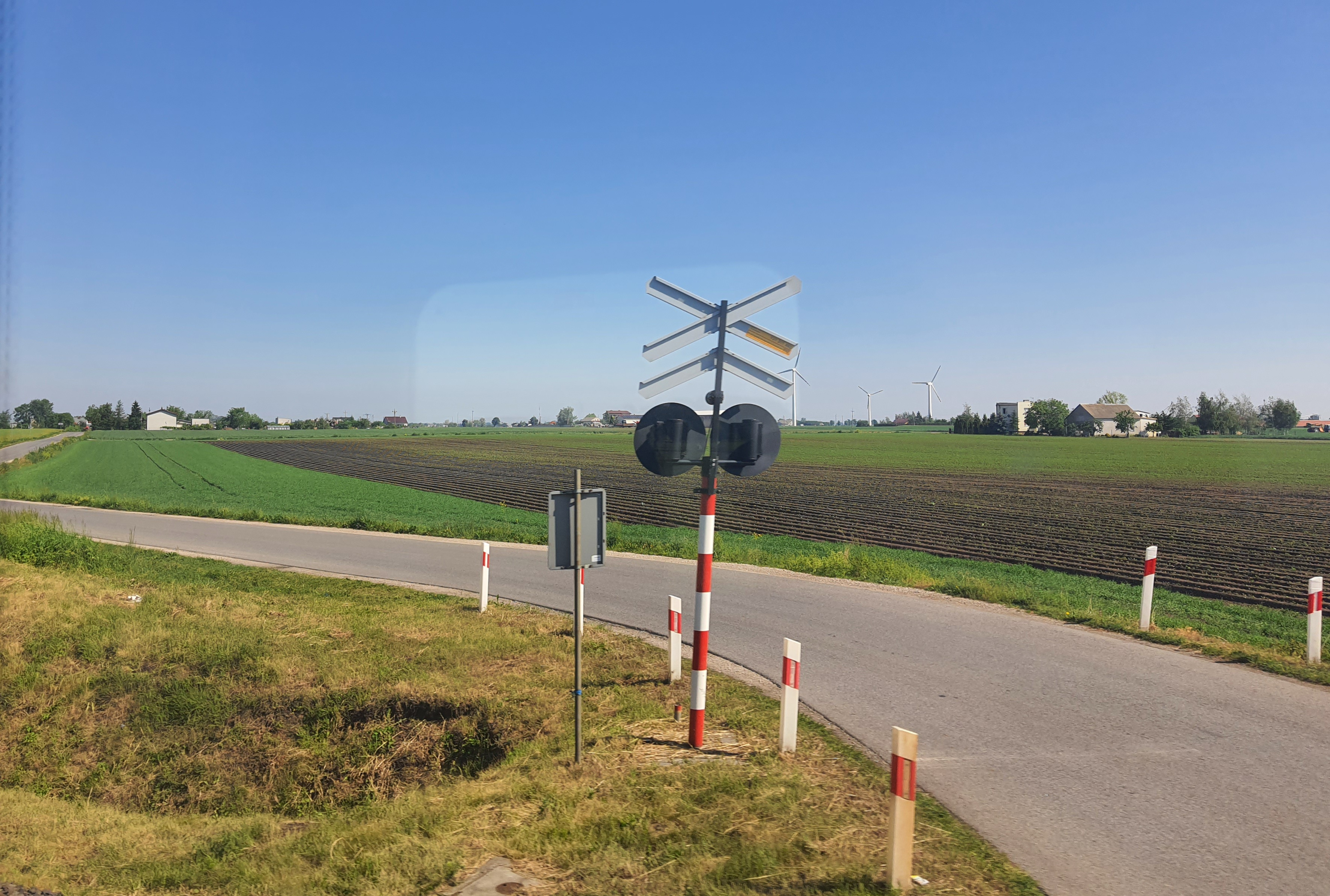

- Location within Poland
- Coordinates: 52°45′14″N 18°18′51″E
- Country: Poland
- Voivodeship: Kuyavian-Pomeranian
- County: Inowrocław
- Gmina: Inowrocław

Sikorowo [ɕikɔˈrɔvɔ] is a village in the administrative district of Gmina Inowrocław, within Inowrocław County, Kuyavian-Pomeranian Voivodeship, in north-central Poland.
