= Mierzwin, Kuyavian-Pomeranian Voivodeship =

Mierzwin
- Village
- Location within Poland
- Coordinates: 52°52′45″N 18°09′12″E
- Country: Poland
- Voivodeship: Kuyavian-Pomeranian
- County: Inowrocław
- Gmina: Złotniki Kujawskie

Mierzwin [ˈmjɛʐvin] is a village in the administrative district of Gmina Złotniki Kujawskie, within Inowrocław County, Kuyavian-Pomeranian Voivodeship, in north-central Poland.
