= Czyste, Kuyavian-Pomeranian Voivodeship =

Czyste
- Village
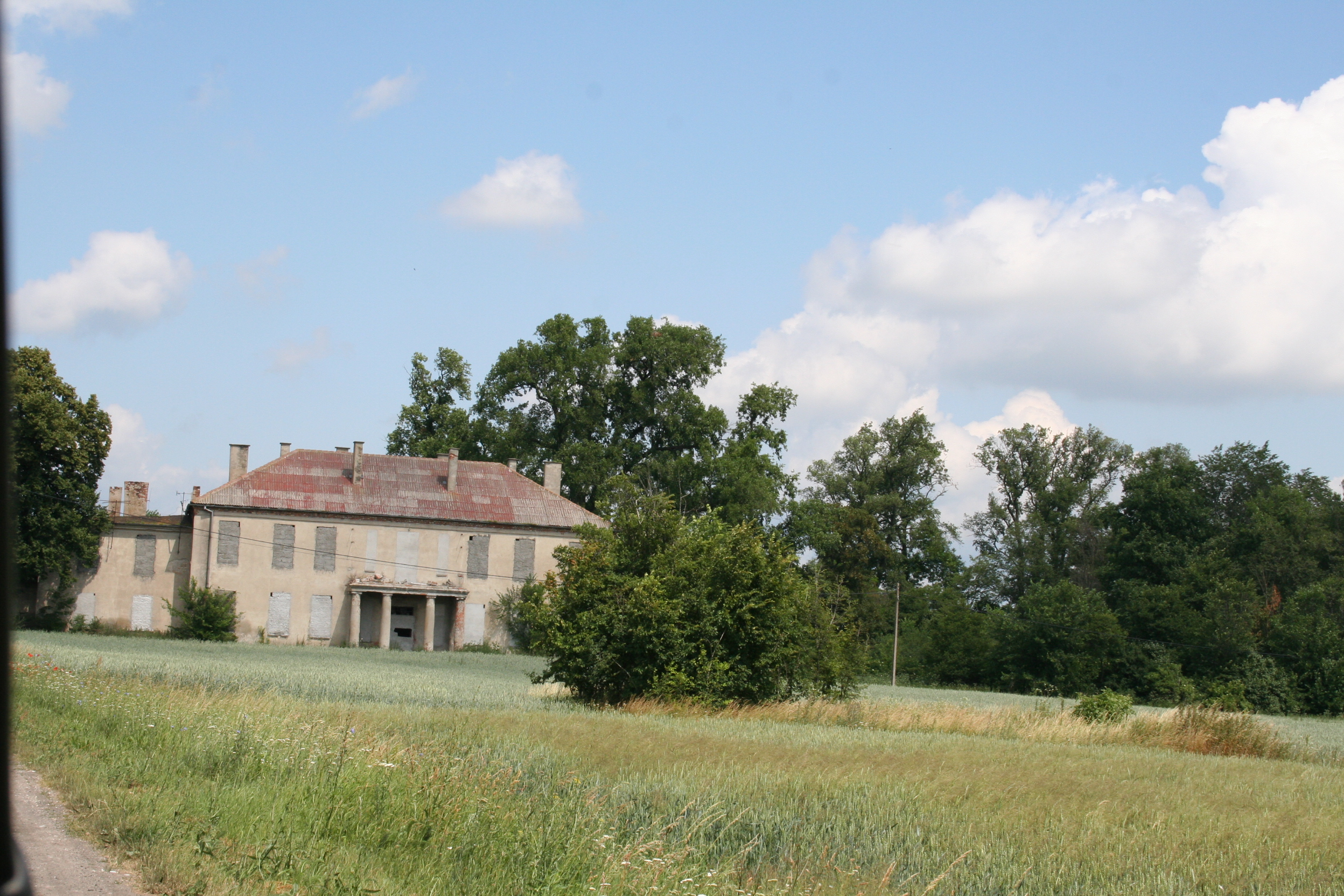
- Manor in Czyste

- Location within Poland
- Coordinates: 52°51′40″N 18°14′15″E
- Country: Poland
- Voivodeship: Kuyavian-Pomeranian
- County: Inowrocław
- Gmina: Inowrocław

Czyste [ˈt͡ʂɨstɛ] is a village in the administrative district of Gmina Inowrocław, within Inowrocław County, Kuyavian-Pomeranian Voivodeship, in north-central Poland.

== History ==
Czyste is a former noble village situated 6 km north of Inowrocław. It was known already in the 15th century, when its owner was the knight Dominik. From the end of the 15th century and for the next 150 years, Modlibogs of the Rola coat of arms had departments in the village. At that time, the village was subordinate to the parish in Liszkowo, and paid tithes there.

In the middle of the 17th century, Stanisław Ostrowski, married to Katarzyna Sulikowska, became its owner. At the end of that century, the property of Czyste and Łążyn was owned by Dorota Niemojewska, married to Hieronim Cieński of the Pomian coat of arms, then Andrzej Cieński, who held a number of senior positions, including the Brzesko-Kuyavian table and its successors.

At the beginning of the 19th century, Czyste Rafał Mierzyński, of the Jastrzębiec coat of arms, purchased from the Cieński family. He was not a good host, so the poorly managed property was put up for auction. In 1827, the village was purchased by Józef Bauditz. In the same year, he sold the property to Hermann Otto von Krüger from Pławin.

In 1844, the Krüger sold Czyste to Ernst Leopold Nehring, who was married to Hermina Kisielnicka, the Topór coat of arms. The estate also included the Łążyn farm. In 1851, Clean for 38 thousand Thalers, were purchased by Juliusz Korneliusz Stubenrauch, and Łążyn for 20.7 thousand Thalers. Around 1856, the owner of Czysty was Juliusz's widow, Leopoldina Reinsdorf; at that time, the present manor house was built in the village. It was built on solid brick foundations of the previous manor house.

In 1860, the village was a dominion with the area of 1072 morgen, There were 8 houses with 117 inhabitants (105 Catholics, 9 Evangelicals, 3 Jews, including 63 illiterate people) in the domain. From 1866, Manfred Guradze, married to Sofia Anna Werther, was the owner of the "knightly estates" of Czyste. In the 1870s, the settlement of Wolanowo, formerly belonging to the Ściborze estate, was included in the estate.

In 1909, their total area was 302 ha, and the net income shown for the purpose of calculating the land tax - 5,977 marks. In 1910, Czyste from the Guradz family was purchased by the son of the current tenant, Maks Kohnert - Franz, who 10 years later sold the property for almost 1.3 million marks to January (Janusz) Korytowski of the Mora coat of arms. During the reign of that same, in 1926, the estate covered 302 ha and showed over 2000 thalers of pure land income.

In 1929, Czyste was bought from Korytowski by Józef Hoppe of his own coat of arms (1886-1939), married to Janina Bieńkowska of the Ślepowron coat of arms. J. Hoppe was a famous agricultural activist, among others, a graduate of the Higher Agricultural and Veterinary School in Munich, president of the Sugar Beet Growers' Association, decorated with the Polonia Restituta Cross; she - an activist of the Farmers' Circle, powiat Inowrocław.

From this union came five children, one of the sons, also Józef, the nickname "falcon", from 1939 in the underground, then fought in the Warsaw Uprising, in the 1st District "Radwan" - 4th grouping "Gurt" - 1st company - platoon 332 Military Service Protection of the Uprising.

Józef Hoppe senior was arrested by the Germans after the outbreak of the war. He died during the "Macabre Night" of October 22/23, 1939 in a prison in Inowrocław, when drunk Ulrich Jahnz from Palczyn together with the landrat Otto Christian Hirschfeld organized a "game" of random killing of prisoners. During World War II, the property was called Reinfeld under German administration. From 1946, these goods became the property of the Polish State Treasury. Initially, the mansion was converted into apartments, then abandoned. A few years ago the windows and doors were bricked up, but this did not stop those willing to "explore" and now the manor is again available to "explorers"

== Monuments ==
According to the NID register of monuments, a manor complex from the middle of the 19th century, reg.no .: 116 / A from April 26, 1984: manor house from the mid-19th century

A building with classicist features. Storey, rectangular in shape, with a hipped roof. A modest columned portico supporting the balcony. At the front there was a circular driveway with a lawn decorated with blue spruce trees. On the left-hand side, an outbuilding was added at the beginning of the 20th century. In 2012, the roof and floor of the first floor of the abovementioned outbuilding were still intact. In 2014, they were already partially collapsed and supported by beams. In 2019, the roof of the outbuilding collapsed almost completely.

=== Park ===
Park from the second half of the 19th century with an area 6 ha. Precious old trees grow here, including: small-leaved linden trees, field elms, European ash, black poplars and white chestnut trees. The undergrowth is made of lilacs, white and blue snowball, Siberian caragana and elderberry. The park is wild, with the old spatial arrangement blurred, yet it is an interesting, green accent among the surrounding fields.
