= Rucewko =

- Village
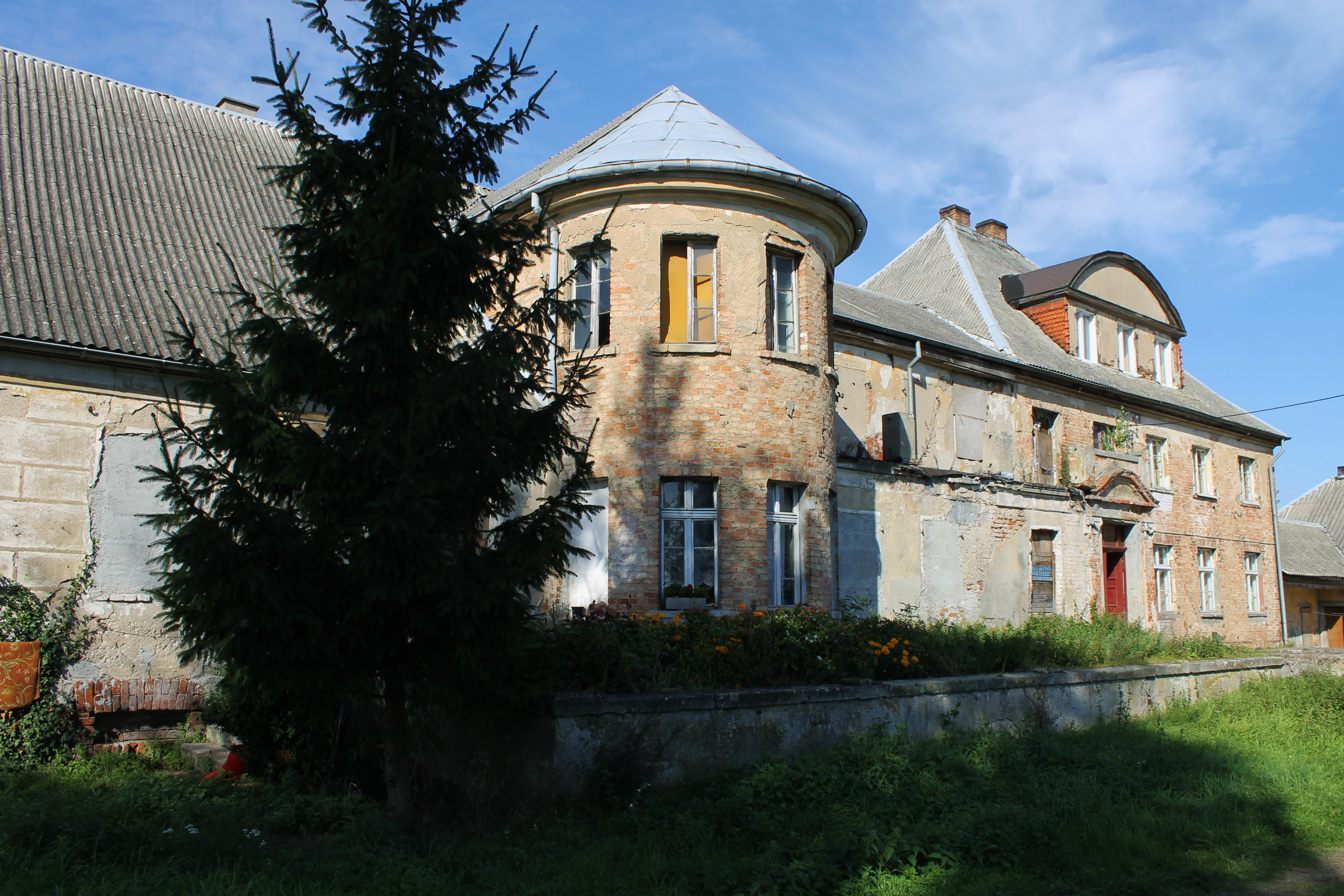
- Manor in Rucewko

- Location within Poland
- Coordinates: 52°54′27″N 18°05′50″E
- Country: Poland
- Voivodeship: Kuyavian-Pomeranian
- County: Inowrocław
- Gmina: Złotniki Kujawskie

Rucewko [ruˈt͡sɛfkɔ] is a village in the administrative district of Gmina Złotniki Kujawskie, within Inowrocław County, Kuyavian-Pomeranian Voivodeship, in north-central Poland.
