= Złotniczki, Kuyavian-Pomeranian Voivodeship =

Złotniczki
- Village
- Location within Poland
- Coordinates: 52°54′44″N 18°8′46″E
- Country: Poland
- Voivodeship: Kuyavian-Pomeranian
- County: Inowrocław
- Gmina: Złotniki Kujawskie

Złotniczki [zwɔtˈnit͡ʂki] is a village in the administrative district of Gmina Złotniki Kujawskie, within Inowrocław County, Kuyavian-Pomeranian Voivodeship, in north-central Poland.
