= Krusza Zamkowa =

- Village
- Location within Poland
- Coordinates: 52°44′27″N 18°13′23″E
- Country: Poland
- Voivodeship: Kuyavian-Pomeranian
- County: Inowrocław
- Gmina: Inowrocław

Krusza Zamkowa [ˈkruʂa zamˈkɔva] is a village in the administrative district of Gmina Inowrocław, within Inowrocław County, Kuyavian-Pomeranian Voivodeship, in north-central Poland.

Identified (next to today's Bydgoszcz and Nakło nad Notecią) as Askaukalis, mentioned by Ptolemy in Geography (Γεωγραφικὴ Ὑφήγησις) and one of 94 located on Magna Germania.
