= Tupadly =

Tupadly may refer to places in the Czech Republic:

- Tupadly (Kutná Hora District), a municipality and village in the Central Bohemian Region
- Tupadly (Mělník District), a municipality and village in the Central Bohemian Region
- Tupadly, a village and part of Klatovy in the Plzeň Region

== See also ==
- Tupadły (disambiguation)
