= Mimowola =

- Village
- Location within Poland
- Coordinates: 52°47′39″N 18°12′40″E
- Country: Poland
- Voivodeship: Kuyavian-Pomeranian
- County: Inowrocław
- Gmina: Inowrocław

Mimowola [mimɔˈvɔla] is a village in the administrative district of Gmina Inowrocław, within Inowrocław County, Kuyavian-Pomeranian Voivodeship, in north-central Poland.
