= Jacewo =

- Village
- Location within Poland
- Coordinates: 52°48′N 18°17′E
- Country: Poland
- Voivodeship: Kuyavian-Pomeranian
- County: Inowrocław
- Gmina: Inowrocław
- Population: 569 (2,011)
- Website: http://www.jacewo.pl

Jacewo [jaˈt͡sɛvɔ] is a village in the administrative district of Gmina Inowrocław, within Inowrocław County, Kuyavian-Pomeranian Voivodeship, in north-central Poland.
