= Jordanowo, Kuyavian-Pomeranian Voivodeship =

Jordanowo
- Village
- Location within Poland
- Coordinates: 52°53′23″N 18°05′30″E
- Country: Poland
- Voivodeship: Kuyavian-Pomeranian
- County: Inowrocław
- Gmina: Złotniki Kujawskie

Jordanowo [jɔrdaˈnɔvɔ] is a village in the administrative district of Gmina Złotniki Kujawskie, within Inowrocław County, Kuyavian-Pomeranian Voivodeship, in north-central Poland.
