= Klopot =

Klopot is a Slavic toponym that may refer to:

- Klopot, Podgorica, Montenegro
- Kłopot, Kuyavian-Pomeranian Voivodeship, Poland
- Kłopot, Lubusz Voivodeship, Poland
