= Orłowo, Inowrocław County =

Orłowo
- Village
- Location within Poland
- Coordinates: 52°50′N 18°16′E
- Country: Poland
- Voivodeship: Kuyavian-Pomeranian
- County: Inowrocław
- Gmina: Inowrocław
- Population: 580

Orłowo [ɔrˈwɔvɔ] is a village in the administrative district of Gmina Inowrocław, within Inowrocław County, Kuyavian-Pomeranian Voivodeship, in north-central Poland.
