= Krusza Podlotowa =

- Village
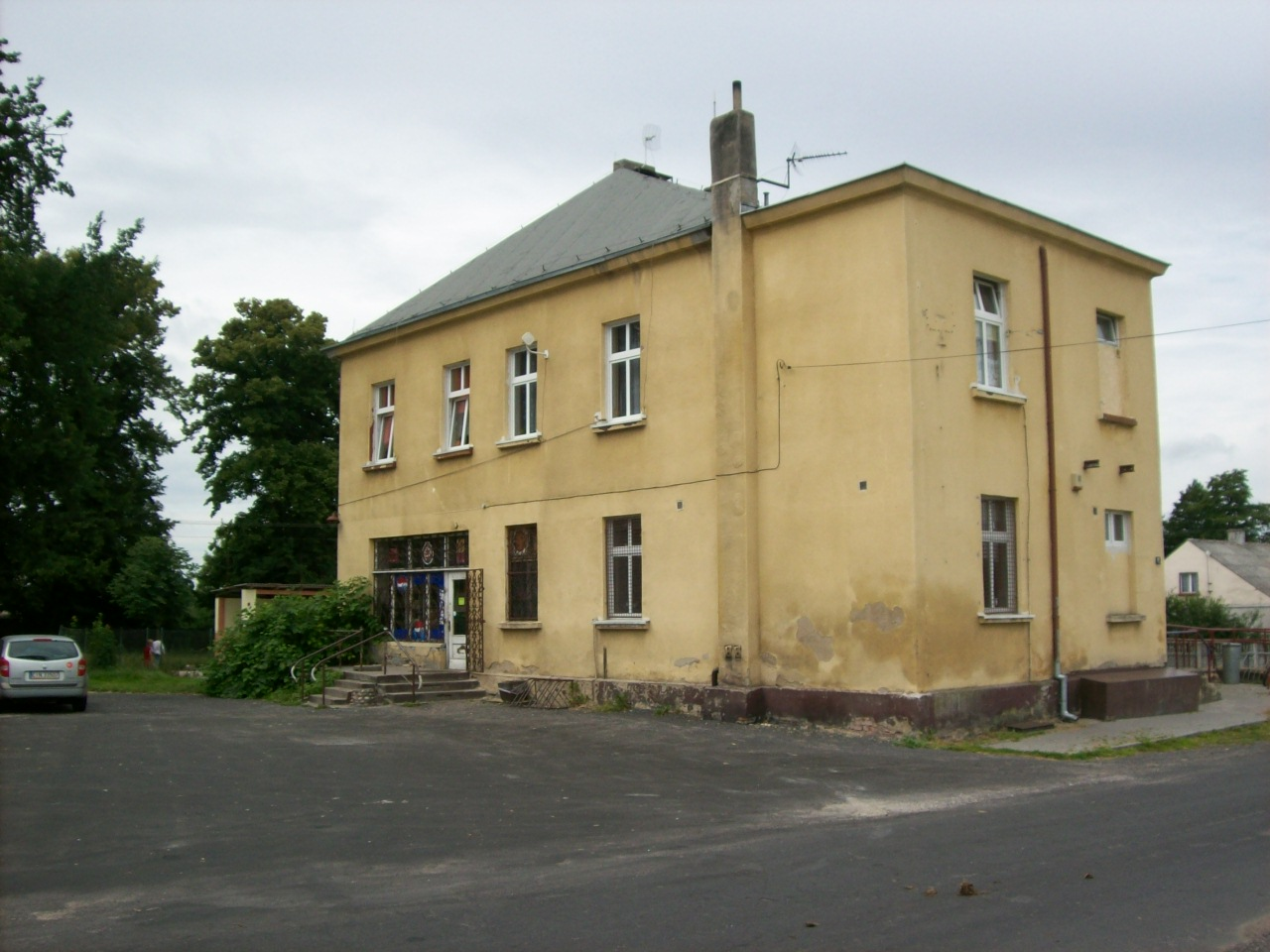
- Manor house in Krusza

- Location within Poland
- Coordinates: 52°44′44″N 18°12′17″E
- Country: Poland
- Voivodeship: Kuyavian-Pomeranian
- County: Inowrocław
- Gmina: Inowrocław

Krusza Podlotowa [ˈkruʂa pɔdlɔˈtɔva] is a village in the administrative district of Gmina Inowrocław, within Inowrocław County, Kuyavian-Pomeranian Voivodeship, in north-central Poland.
