= Dziennice =

- Village
- Location within Poland
- Coordinates: 52°46′N 18°20′E
- Country: Poland
- Voivodeship: Kuyavian-Pomeranian
- County: Inowrocław
- Gmina: Inowrocław
- Elevation: 80 m (260 ft)
- Population: 125
- Website: www.inowroclaw.ug.gov.pl

Dziennice [d͡ʑɛnˈnit͡sɛ] (German: Dziennitz) is a village in the administrative district of Gmina Inowrocław, within Inowrocław County, Kuyavian-Pomeranian Voivodeship, in north-central Poland.
