= Będzitówek =

- Village
- Location within Poland
- Coordinates: 52°55′14″N 18°2′10″E
- Country: Poland
- Voivodeship: Kuyavian-Pomeranian
- County: Inowrocław
- Gmina: Złotniki Kujawskie
- Population: 100

Będzitówek [bɛnd͡ʑiˈtuvɛk] is a village in the administrative district of Gmina Złotniki Kujawskie, within Inowrocław County, Kuyavian-Pomeranian Voivodeship, in north-central Poland.
