= Karczyn-Wieś =

- Village
- Location within Poland
- Coordinates: 52°44′08″N 18°23′08″E
- Country: Poland
- Voivodeship: Kuyavian-Pomeranian
- County: Inowrocław
- Gmina: Inowrocław

Karczyn-Wieś [ˈkart͡ʂɨn ˈvjɛɕ] is a small village in Poland the administrative district of Gmina Inowrocław, within Inowrocław County, Kuyavian-Pomeranian Voivodeship, in north-central Poland.
