= Klepary =

- Village
- Location within Poland
- Coordinates: 52°51′N 18°28′E
- Country: Poland
- Voivodeship: Kuyavian-Pomeranian
- County: Inowrocław
- Gmina: Gniewkowo
- Population (approx.): 150

Klepary [klɛˈparɨ] is a village in the administrative district of Gmina Gniewkowo, within Inowrocław County, Kuyavian-Pomeranian Voivodeship, in north-central Poland.

The village has an approximate population of 150.
