= Jaksiczki =

- Village
- Location within Poland
- Coordinates: 52°52′36″N 18°10′18″E
- Country: Poland
- Voivodeship: Kuyavian-Pomeranian
- County: Inowrocław
- Gmina: Inowrocław

Jaksiczki [jakˈɕit͡ʂki] is a village in the administrative district of Gmina Inowrocław, within Inowrocław County, Kuyavian-Pomeranian Voivodeship, in north-central Poland.
