= Żalinowo =

- Village
- Location within Poland
- Coordinates: 52°45′N 18°11′E
- Country: Poland
- Voivodeship: Kuyavian-Pomeranian
- County: Inowrocław
- Gmina: Inowrocław

Żalinowo [ʐaliˈnɔvɔ] is a village in the administrative district of Gmina Inowrocław, within Inowrocław County, Kuyavian-Pomeranian Voivodeship, in north-central Poland.
