= Cieślin, Kuyavian-Pomeranian Voivodeship =

Cieślin
- Village
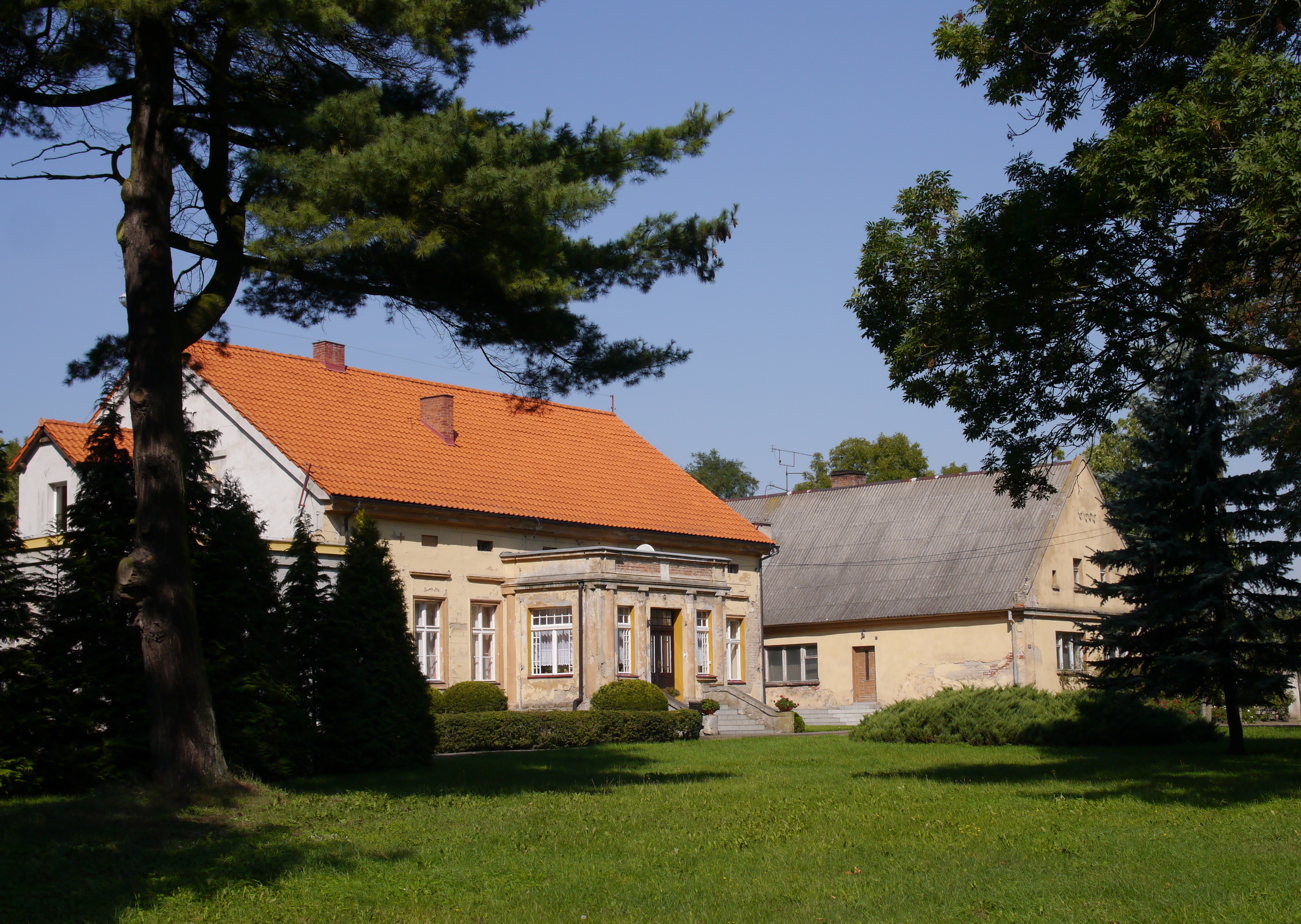
- Manor house in Cieślin

- Location within Poland
- Coordinates: 52°48′08″N 18°11′53″E
- Country: Poland
- Voivodeship: Kuyavian-Pomeranian
- County: Inowrocław
- Gmina: Inowrocław

Cieślin [ˈt͡ɕɛɕlin] is a village in the administrative district of Gmina Inowrocław, within Inowrocław County, Kuyavian-Pomeranian Voivodeship, in north-central Poland.
