= Pławinek =

- Village
- Location within Poland
- Coordinates: 52°45′31″N 18°21′47″E
- Country: Poland
- Voivodeship: Kuyavian-Pomeranian
- County: Inowrocław
- Gmina: Inowrocław

Pławinek [pwaˈvinɛk] is a village in the administrative district of Gmina Inowrocław, within Inowrocław County, Kuyavian-Pomeranian Voivodeship, in north-central Poland.
