= Miechowice =

Miechowice may refer to the following places:

- Miechowice, Inowrocław County in Kuyavian-Pomeranian Voivodeship (north-central Poland)
- Miechowice, Włocławek County in Kuyavian-Pomeranian Voivodeship (north-central Poland)
- Miechowice, Masovian Voivodeship (east-central Poland)
