= Będzitowo =

- Village
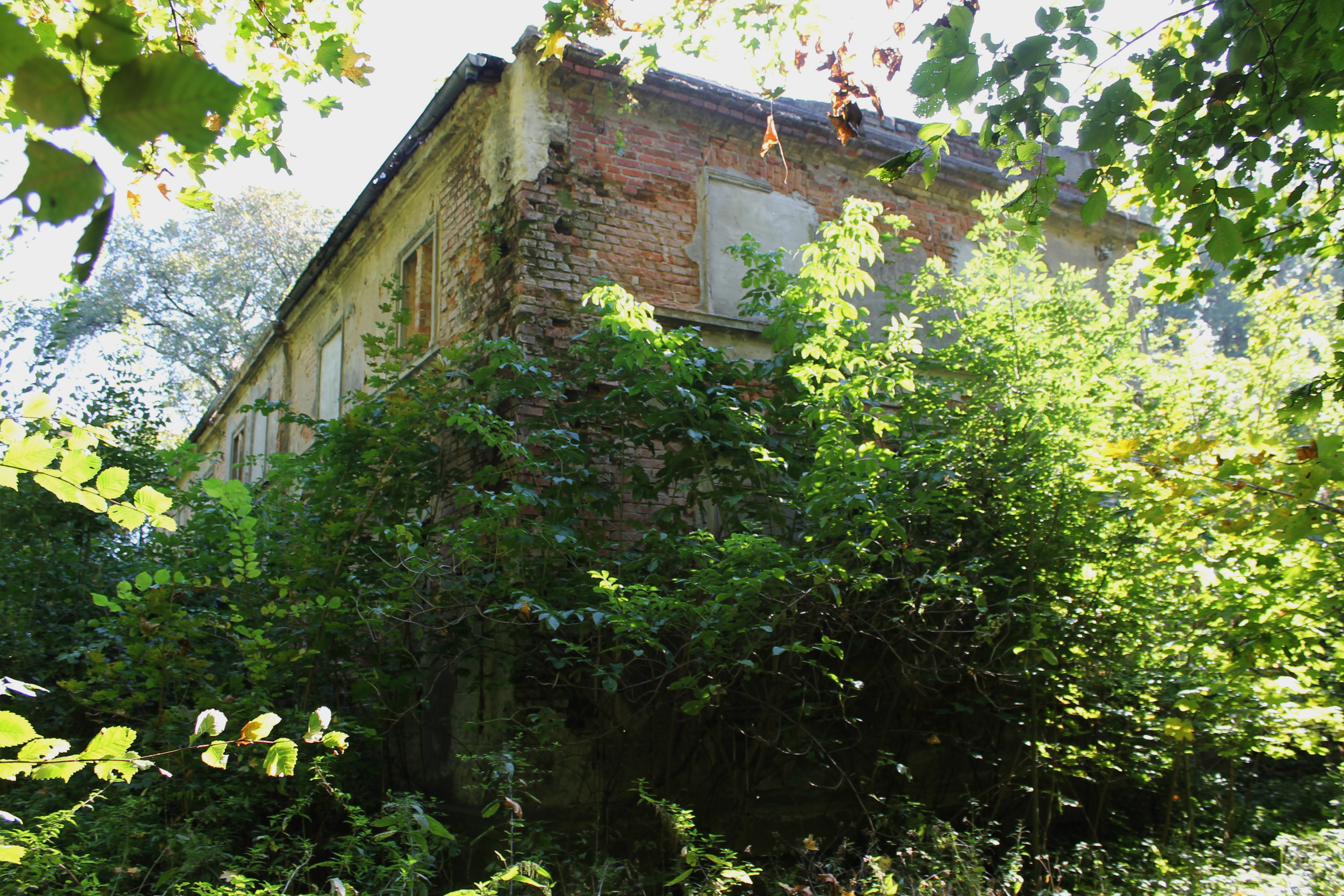
- Manor in Będzitowo

- Coat of arms

- Location within Poland
- Coordinates: 52°54′58″N 18°0′5″E
- Country: Poland
- Voivodeship: Kuyavian-Pomeranian
- County: Inowrocław
- Gmina: Złotniki Kujawskie

Będzitowo [bɛnd͡ʑiˈtɔvɔ] is a village in the administrative district of Gmina Złotniki Kujawskie, within Inowrocław County, Kuyavian-Pomeranian Voivodeship, in north-central Poland.
