= Branno =

Branno may refer to:

- Brännö, an island in Sweden
- Branno, Kuyavian-Pomeranian Voivodeship (north-central Poland)
- Branno, Greater Poland Voivodeship (west-central Poland)
- Harla Branno, fictional character in Foundation's Edge by Isaac Asimov
