= Radłówek =

- Village
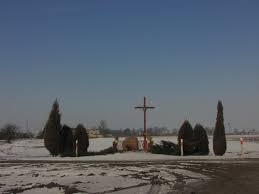
- Wayside cross in Radłówek

- Location within Poland
- Coordinates: 52°49′57″N 18°10′13″E
- Country: Poland
- Voivodeship: Kuyavian-Pomeranian
- County: Inowrocław
- Gmina: Inowrocław

Radłówek [radˈwuvɛk] is a village in the administrative district of Gmina Inowrocław, within Inowrocław County, Kuyavian-Pomeranian Voivodeship, in north-central Poland.
