= Dąblin =

- Village
- Location within Poland
- Coordinates: 52°55′N 18°23′E
- Country: Poland
- Voivodeship: Kuyavian-Pomeranian
- County: Inowrocław
- Gmina: Gniewkowo

Dąblin (Polish pronunciation: [ˈdomblin]) is a village in the administrative district of Gmina Gniewkowo, within Inowrocław County, Kuyavian-Pomeranian Voivodeship, in north-central Poland.
