= Góra, Inowrocław County =

Góra
- Village
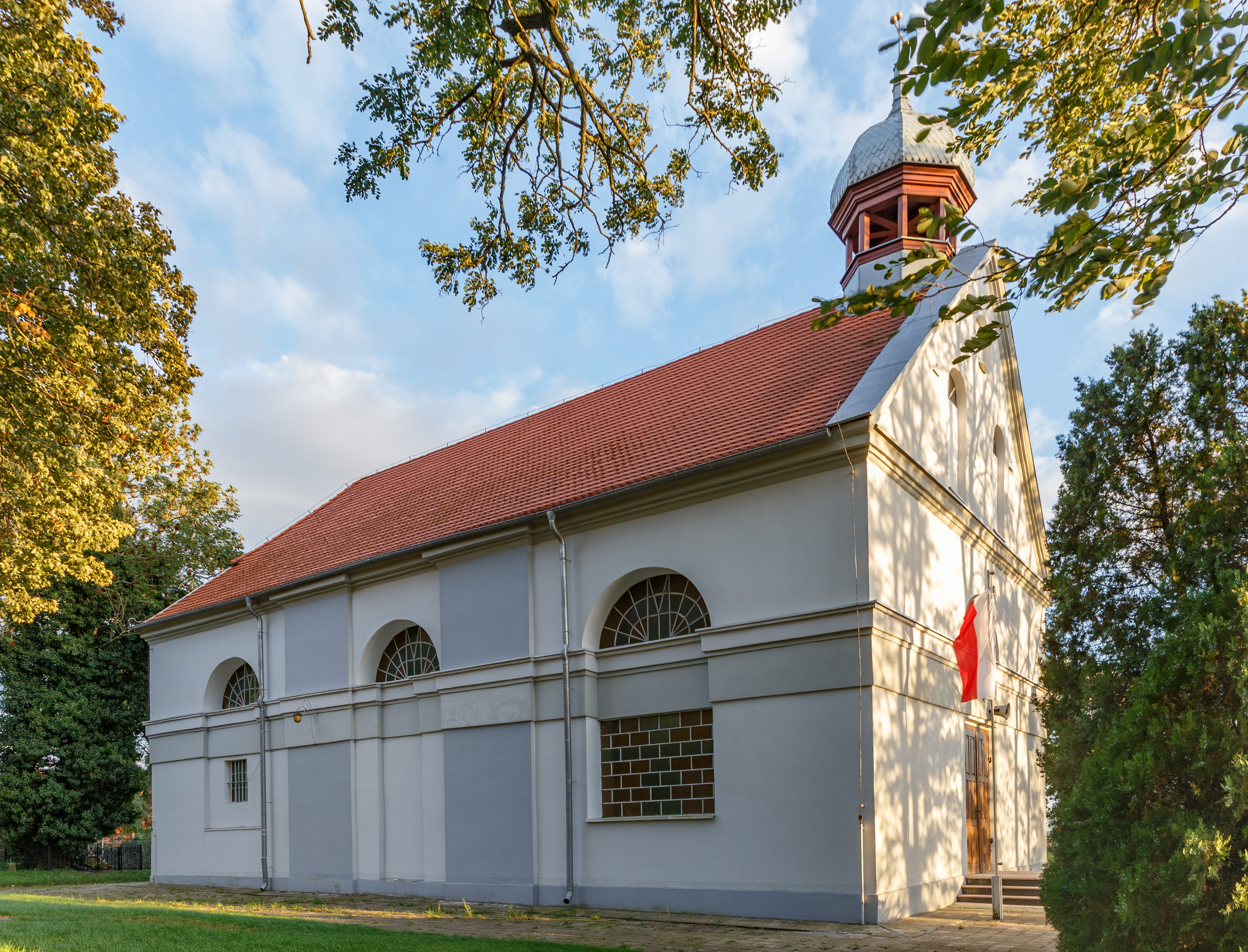
- Holy Trinity church in Góra

- Location within Poland
- Coordinates: 52°44′38″N 18°21′9″E
- Country: Poland
- Voivodeship: Kuyavian-Pomeranian
- County: Inowrocław
- Gmina: Inowrocław

Population
  - Total: 250
- Time zone: UTC+1 (CET)
  - Summer (DST): UTC+2 (CEST)

Góra [ˈɡura] is a village in the administrative district of Gmina Inowrocław, within Inowrocław County, Kuyavian-Pomeranian Voivodeship, in central Poland.
