= Podgaj, Inowrocław County =

Podgaj
- Village
- Location within Poland
- Coordinates: 52°51′35″N 18°6′18″E
- Country: Poland
- Voivodeship: Kuyavian-Pomeranian
- County: Inowrocław
- Gmina: Złotniki Kujawskie

Podgaj [ˈpɔdɡai̯] is a village in the administrative district of Gmina Złotniki Kujawskie, within Inowrocław County, Kuyavian-Pomeranian Voivodeship, in north-central Poland.
