= Bąbolin =

- Village
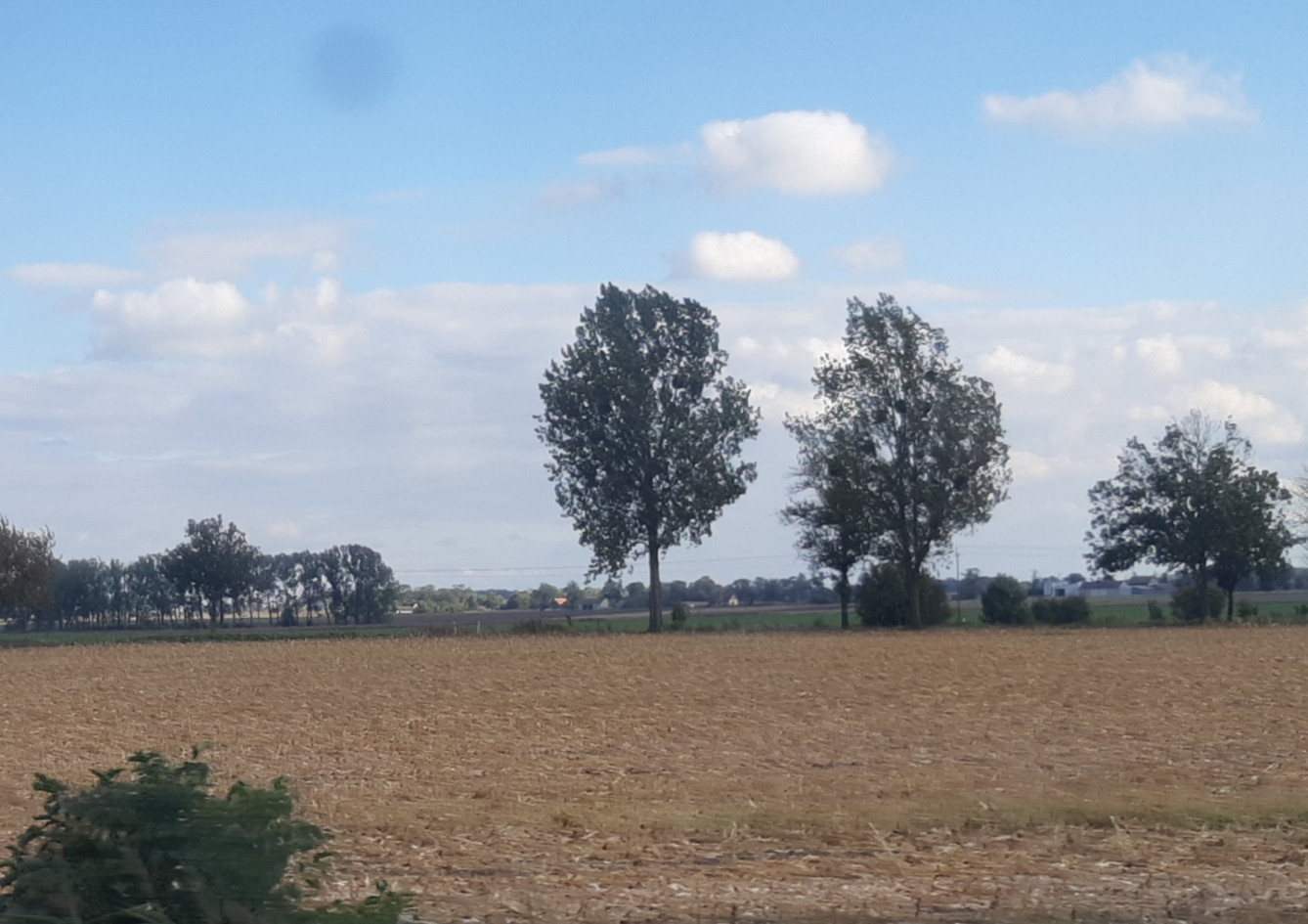

- Location within Poland
- Coordinates: 52°52′38″N 18°23′47″E
- Country: Poland
- Voivodeship: Kuyavian-Pomeranian
- County: Inowrocław
- Gmina: Gniewkowo

Bąbolin [bɔmˈbɔlin] (German: Bombolin) is a village in the administrative district of Gmina Gniewkowo, within Inowrocław County, Kuyavian-Pomeranian Voivodeship, in north-central Poland.
