= Helenowo, Inowrocław County =

Helenowo
- Village
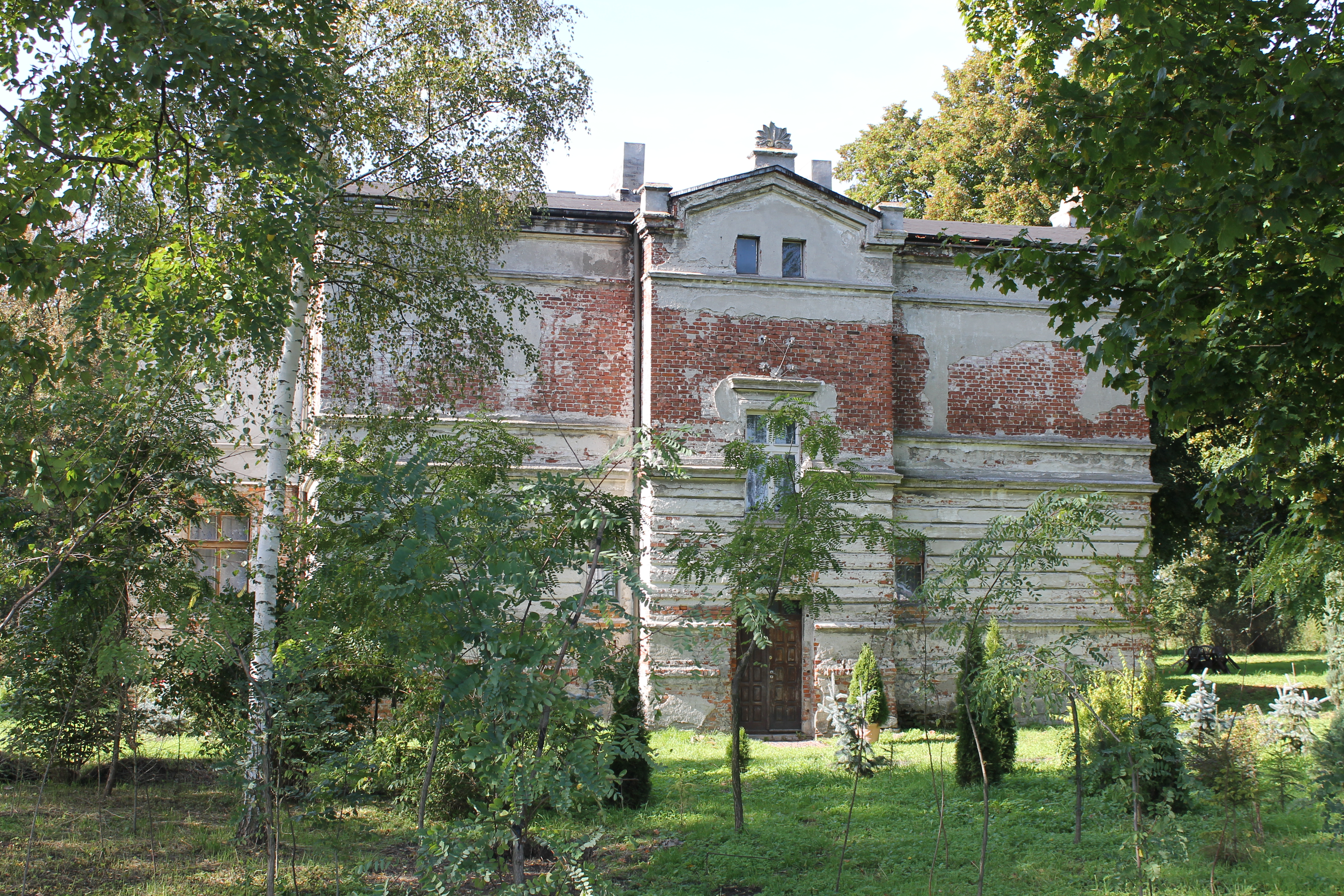

- Location within Poland
- Coordinates: 52°51′24″N 18°9′16″E
- Country: Poland
- Voivodeship: Kuyavian-Pomeranian
- County: Inowrocław
- Gmina: Złotniki Kujawskie

Helenowo [xɛlɛˈnɔvɔ] is a village in the administrative district of Gmina Złotniki Kujawskie, within Inowrocław County, Kuyavian-Pomeranian Voivodeship, in north-central Poland.
