= Kruśliwiec =

- Village
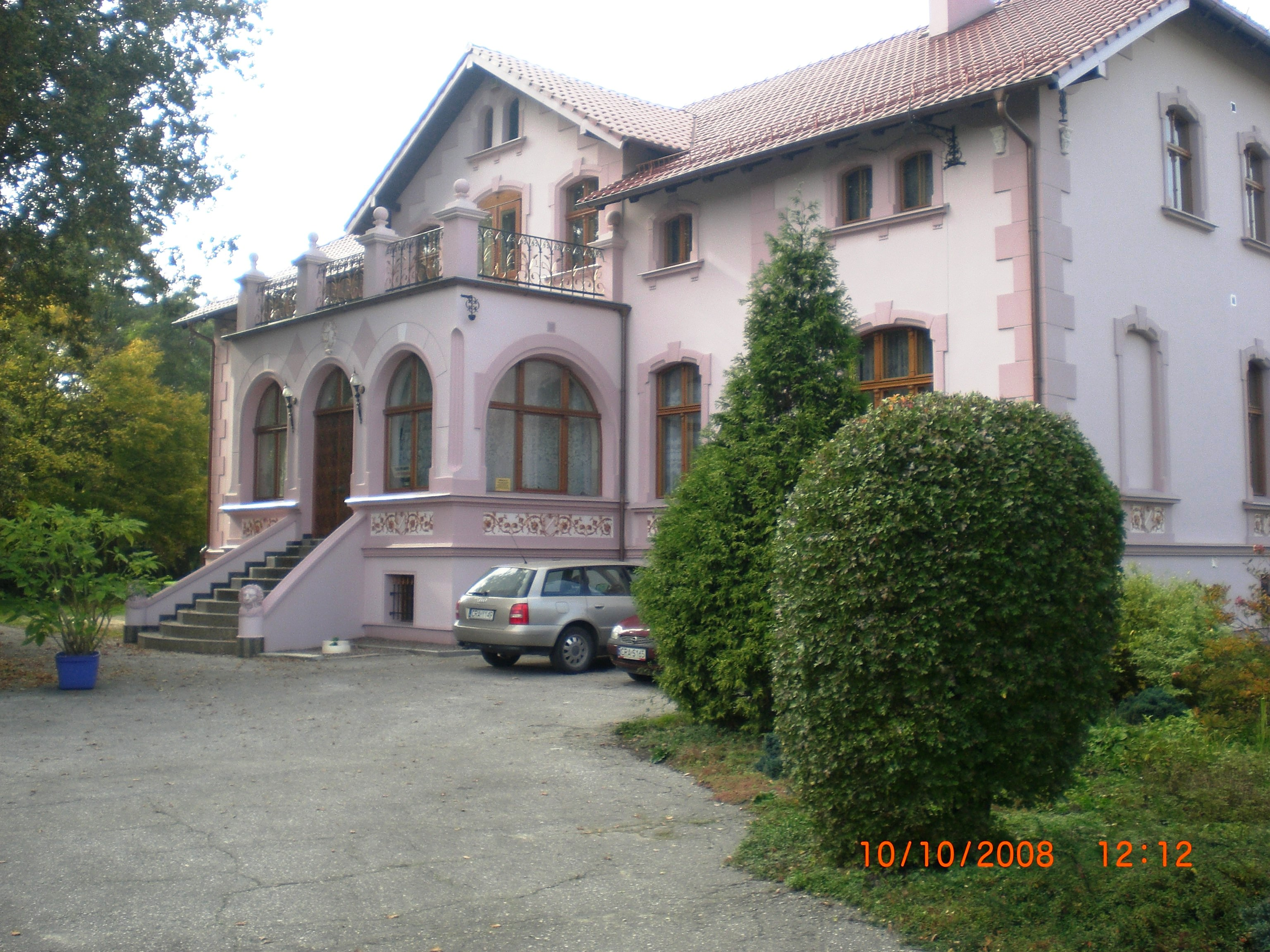
- Kruśliwiec, manor house

- Location within Poland
- Coordinates: 52°48′20″N 18°14′19″E
- Country: Poland
- Voivodeship: Kuyavian-Pomeranian
- County: Inowrocław
- Gmina: Inowrocław

Kruśliwiec [kruˈɕlivjɛt͡s] is a village in the administrative district of Gmina Inowrocław, within Inowrocław County, Kuyavian-Pomeranian Voivodeship, in north-central Poland.
