= Ostrowo Krzyckie =

- Village
- Location within Poland
- Coordinates: 52°43′22″N 18°18′8″E
- Country: Poland
- Voivodeship: Kuyavian-Pomeranian
- County: Inowrocław
- Gmina: Inowrocław
- Population: 30

Ostrowo Krzyckie [ɔsˈtrɔvɔ ˈkʂɨt͡skʲɛ] is a village in the administrative district of Gmina Inowrocław, within Inowrocław County, Kuyavian-Pomeranian Voivodeship, in north-central Poland.
