= Krusza Duchowna =

- Village
- Location within Poland
- Coordinates: 52°44′N 18°14′E
- Country: Poland
- Voivodeship: Kuyavian-Pomeranian
- County: Inowrocław
- Gmina: Inowrocław

Krusza Duchowna [ˈkruʂa duˈxɔvna] is a village in the administrative district of Gmina Inowrocław, within Inowrocław County, Kuyavian-Pomeranian Voivodeship, in north-central Poland.
