= Turlejewo =

- Village
- Location within Poland
- Coordinates: 52°50′55″N 18°09′42″E
- Country: Poland
- Voivodeship: Kuyavian-Pomeranian
- County: Inowrocław
- Gmina: Inowrocław

Turlejewo [turlɛˈjɛvɔ] is a village in the administrative district of Gmina Inowrocław, within Inowrocław County, Kuyavian-Pomeranian Voivodeship, in north-central Poland.
