= Dobrogościce =

- Village
- Location within Poland
- Coordinates: 52°55′47″N 18°07′43″E
- Country: Poland
- Voivodeship: Kuyavian-Pomeranian
- County: Inowrocław
- Gmina: Złotniki Kujawskie

Dobrogościce [dɔbrɔɡɔɕˈt͡ɕit͡sɛ] is a village in the administrative district of Gmina Złotniki Kujawskie, within Inowrocław County, Kuyavian-Pomeranian Voivodeship, in north-central Poland.
