= Kawęczyn, Inowrocław County =

Kawęczyn
- Village
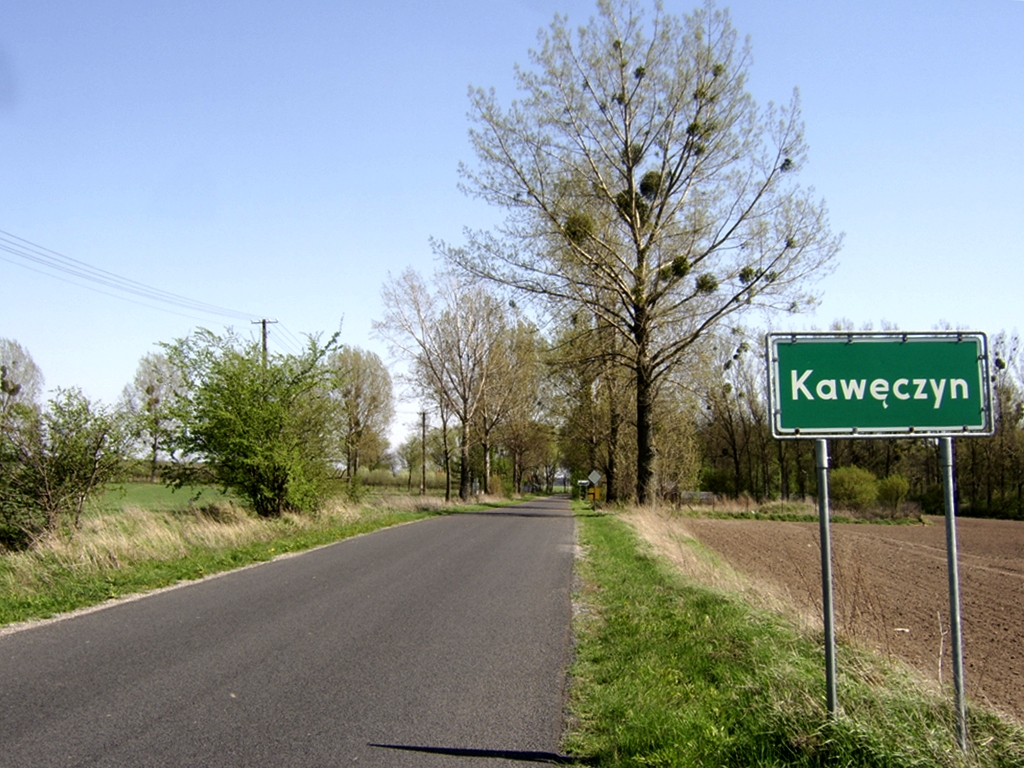
- Road sign in Kawęczyn

- Location within Poland
- Coordinates: 52°51′50″N 18°32′31″E
- Country: Poland
- Voivodeship: Kuyavian-Pomeranian
- County: Inowrocław
- Gmina: Gniewkowo

Kawęczyn [kaˈvɛnt͡ʂɨn] is a village in the administrative district of Gmina Gniewkowo, within Inowrocław County, Kuyavian-Pomeranian Voivodeship, in north-central Poland.
