= Lipie, Kuyavian-Pomeranian Voivodeship =

Lipie
- Village
- Location within Poland
- Coordinates: 52°52′40″N 18°26′40″E
- Country: Poland
- Voivodeship: Kuyavian-Pomeranian
- County: Inowrocław
- Gmina: Gniewkowo

Lipie [ˈlipjɛ] is a village in the administrative district of Gmina Gniewkowo, within Inowrocław County, Kuyavian-Pomeranian Voivodeship, in north-central Poland.
