= Broniewo =

Broniewo may refer to the following places:

- Broniewo, Inowrocław County in Kuyavian-Pomeranian Voivodeship (north-central Poland)
- Broniewo, Radziejów County in Kuyavian-Pomeranian Voivodeship (north-central Poland)
- Broniewo, Nakło County in Kuyavian-Pomeranian Voivodeship (north-central Poland)
- Broniewo, Pomeranian Voivodeship (north Poland)
