= Leszcze, Kuyavian-Pomeranian Voivodeship =

Leszcze
- Village
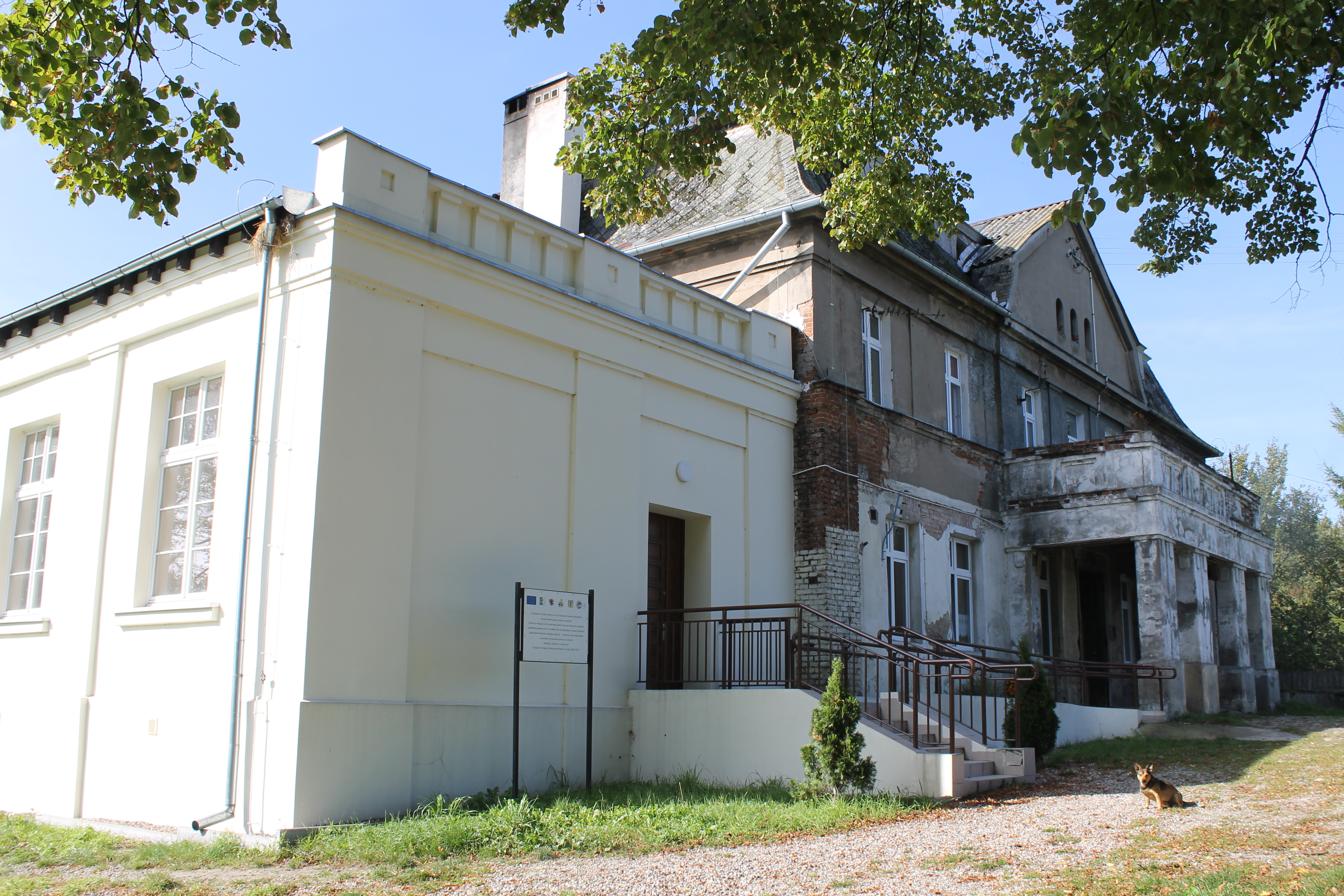

- Location within Poland
- Coordinates: 52°52′49″N 18°06′37″E
- Country: Poland
- Voivodeship: Kuyavian-Pomeranian
- County: Inowrocław
- Gmina: Złotniki Kujawskie

Leszcze (German 1939-1945 Fischau) [ˈlɛʂt͡ʂɛ] is a village in the administrative district of Gmina Złotniki Kujawskie, within Inowrocław County, Kuyavian-Pomeranian Voivodeship, in north-central Poland.
