= Gniewkówiec =

- Village
- Location within Poland
- Coordinates: 52°55′11″N 18°08′59″E
- Country: Poland
- Voivodeship: Kuyavian-Pomeranian
- County: Inowrocław
- Gmina: Złotniki Kujawskie

Gniewkówiec [ɡɲɛfˈkuvjɛt͡s] (German: Gniewkowitz) is a village in the administrative district of Gmina Złotniki Kujawskie, within Inowrocław County, Kuyavian-Pomeranian Voivodeship, in north-central Poland.
