= Borkowo, Kuyavian-Pomeranian Voivodeship =

Borkowo
- Village
- Location within Poland
- Coordinates: 52°50′N 18°11′E
- Country: Poland
- Voivodeship: Kuyavian-Pomeranian
- County: Inowrocław
- Gmina: Inowrocław

Borkowo [bɔrˈkɔvɔ] (German: Erzleben, 1944) is a village in the administrative district of Gmina Inowrocław, within Inowrocław County, Kuyavian-Pomeranian Voivodeship, in north-central Poland.
