= Dulsk, Inowrocław County =

Dulsk
- Village
- Location within Poland
- Coordinates: 52°45′20″N 18°20′31″E
- Country: Poland
- Voivodeship: Kuyavian-Pomeranian
- County: Inowrocław
- Gmina: Inowrocław
- Population: 210

Dulsk [dulsk] is a village in the administrative district of Gmina Inowrocław, within Inowrocław County, Kuyavian-Pomeranian Voivodeship, in north-central Poland.
