= Latkowo, Inowrocław County =

Latkowo
- Village
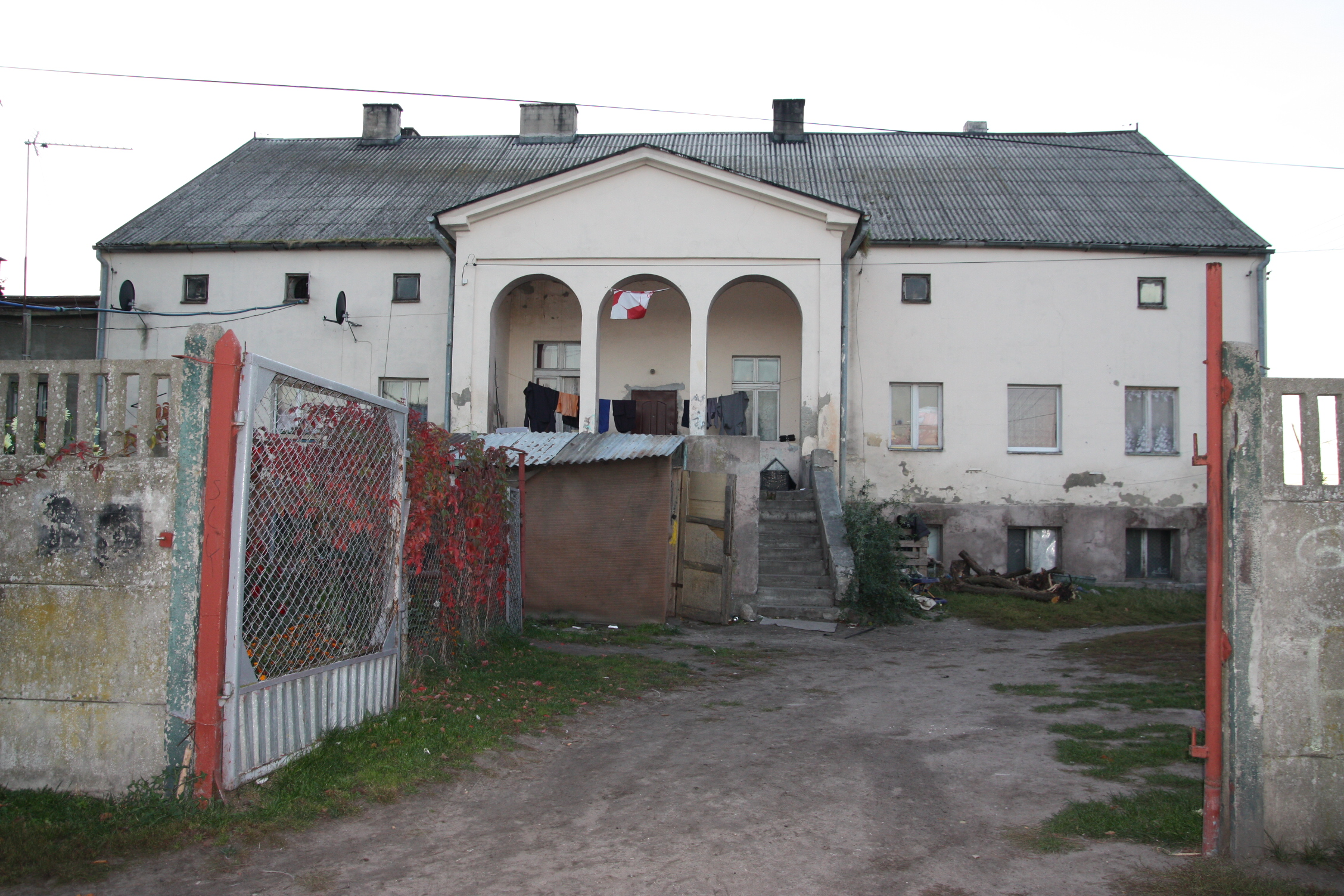
- Manor houses in Kuyavian-Pomeranian Voivodeshi

- Location within Poland
- Coordinates: 52°49′49″N 18°18′07″E
- Country: Poland
- Voivodeship: Kuyavian-Pomeranian
- County: Inowrocław
- Gmina: Inowrocław

Latkowo [latˈkɔvɔ] is a village in the administrative district of Gmina Inowrocław, within Inowrocław County, Kuyavian-Pomeranian Voivodeship, in north-central Poland.
