= Piotrkowice, Kuyavian-Pomeranian Voivodeship =

Piotrkowice
- Village
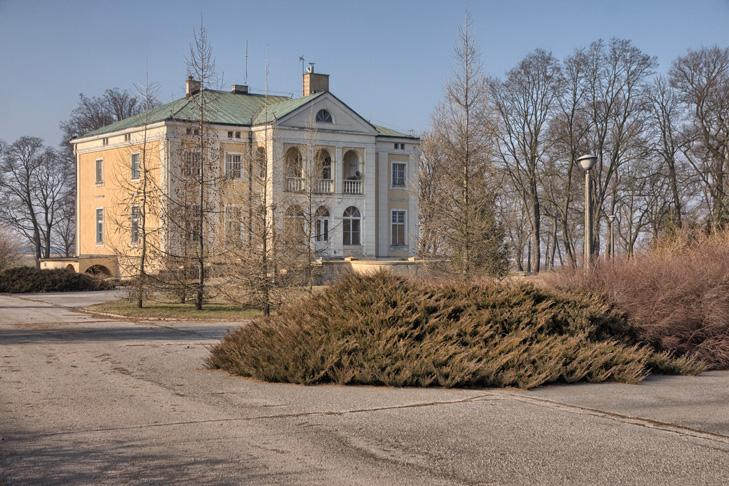
- The Rutkowski manor in Piotrkowice

- Location within Poland
- Coordinates: 52°45′11″N 18°10′37″E
- Country: Poland
- Voivodeship: Kuyavian-Pomeranian
- County: Inowrocław
- Gmina: Inowrocław

Piotrkowice [pjɔtrkɔˈvit͡sɛ] is a village in the administrative district of Gmina Inowrocław, within Inowrocław County, Kuyavian-Pomeranian Voivodeship, in north-central Poland.
