= Niszczewice =

- Village
- Location within Poland
- Coordinates: 52°54′N 18°11′E
- Country: Poland
- Voivodeship: Kuyavian-Pomeranian
- County: Inowrocław
- Gmina: Złotniki Kujawskie

Niszczewice [niʂt͡ʂɛˈvit͡sɛ] is a village in the administrative district of Gmina Złotniki Kujawskie, within Inowrocław County, Kuyavian-Pomeranian Voivodeship, in north-central Poland.
