= Kijewo =

Kijewo may refer to the following places:

- Kijewo, Greater Poland Voivodeship (west-central Poland)
- Kijewo, Kuyavian-Pomeranian Voivodeship (north-central Poland)
- Kijewo, Warmian-Masurian Voivodeship (north Poland)
- Kijewo, Szczecin
