= Tupadły =

Tupadły may refer to the following places:

- Tupadły, Gmina Inowrocław in Kuyavian-Pomeranian Voivodeship (north-central Poland)
- Tupadły, Gmina Złotniki Kujawskie in Kuyavian-Pomeranian Voivodeship (north-central Poland)
- Tupadły, Lipno County in Kuyavian-Pomeranian Voivodeship (north-central Poland)
- Tupadły, Nakło County in Kuyavian-Pomeranian Voivodeship (north-central Poland)
- Tupadły, Masovian Voivodeship (east-central Poland)
- Tupadły, Pomeranian Voivodeship (north Poland)
