= Stefanowo, Inowrocław County =

Stefanowo
- Village
- Location within Poland
- Coordinates: 52°51′54″N 18°10′35″E
- Country: Poland
- Voivodeship: Kuyavian-Pomeranian
- County: Inowrocław
- Gmina: Inowrocław
- Population: 100

Stefanowo [stɛfaˈnɔvɔ] is a village in the administrative district of Gmina Inowrocław, within Inowrocław County, Kuyavian-Pomeranian Voivodeship, in north-central Poland.
