= Krężoły, Kuyavian-Pomeranian Voivodeship =

Krężoły
- Village
- Location within Poland
- Coordinates: 52°53′18″N 18°7′55″E
- Country: Poland
- Voivodeship: Kuyavian-Pomeranian
- County: Inowrocław
- Gmina: Złotniki Kujawskie
- Population: 100

Krężoły [krɛ̃ˈʐɔwɨ] is a village in the administrative district of Gmina Złotniki Kujawskie, within Inowrocław County, Kuyavian-Pomeranian Voivodeship, in north-central Poland.
