= Gnojno, Inowrocław County =

Gnojno
- Village
- Location within Poland
- Coordinates: 52°49′52″N 18°15′00″E
- Country: Poland
- Voivodeship: Kuyavian-Pomeranian
- County: Inowrocław
- Gmina: Inowrocław

Gnojno [ˈɡnɔi̯nɔ] is a village in the administrative district of Gmina Inowrocław, within Inowrocław County, Kuyavian-Pomeranian Voivodeship, in north-central Poland.
