= Dąbrówka Kujawska =

- Village
- Location within Poland
- Coordinates: 52°57′N 18°2′E
- Country: Poland
- Voivodeship: Kuyavian-Pomeranian
- County: Inowrocław
- Gmina: Złotniki Kujawskie
- Time zone: UTC+1 (CET)
  - Summer (DST): UTC+2 (CEST)
- Vehicle registration: CIN

Dąbrówka Kujawska [dɔmˈbrufka kuˈjafska] is a village in the administrative district of Gmina Złotniki Kujawskie, within Inowrocław County, Kuyavian-Pomeranian Voivodeship, in central Poland.

Four Polish citizens were murdered by Nazi Germany in the village during World War II.
