= Jaksice =

Jaksice may refer to the following places:

- Jaksice, Kuyavian-Pomeranian Voivodeship (north-central Poland)
- Jaksice, Miechów County in Lesser Poland Voivodeship (south Poland)
- Jaksice, Proszowice County in Lesser Poland Voivodeship (south Poland)
