= Tuczno, Kuyavian-Pomeranian Voivodeship =

Tuczno
- Village
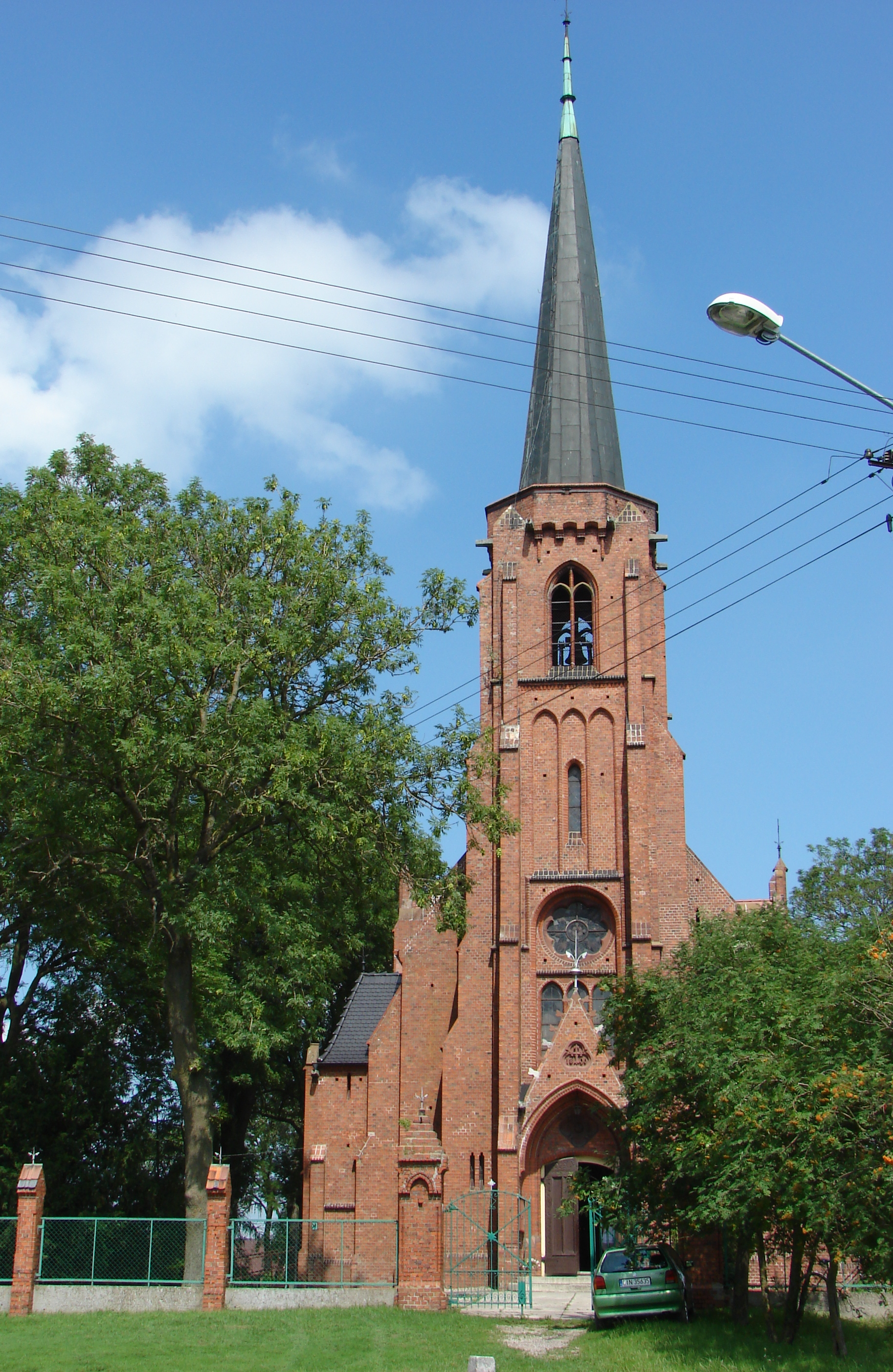
- Sts Peter & Paul church from 1889−1891.

- Location within Poland
- Coordinates: 52°51′N 18°8′E
- Country: Poland
- Voivodeship: Kuyavian-Pomeranian
- County: Inowrocław
- Gmina: Złotniki Kujawskie

Tuczno [ˈtut͡ʂnɔ] is a village in the administrative district of Gmina Złotniki Kujawskie, within Inowrocław County, Kuyavian-Pomeranian Voivodeship, in north-central Poland.
