= Turzany =

Turzany may refer to the following places in Poland:

- Turzany, Lower Silesian Voivodeship (south-west Poland)
- Turzany, Kuyavian-Pomeranian Voivodeship (north-central Poland)
