= Będzitowskie Huby =

- Village
- Location within Poland
- Coordinates: 52°55′48.91″N 18°00′29.06″E
- Country: Poland
- Voivodeship: Kuyavian-Pomeranian
- County: Inowrocław
- Gmina: Złotniki Kujawskie

Będzitowskie Huby [bɛnd͡ʑiˈtɔfskʲɛ ˈxubɨ] is a village in the administrative district of Gmina Złotniki Kujawskie, within Inowrocław County, Kuyavian-Pomeranian Voivodeship, in north-central Poland.
