= Karczówka =

Karczówka may refer to the following places:

- Karczówka, Kuyavian-Pomeranian Voivodeship (north-central Poland)
- Karczówka, Przysucha County in Masovian Voivodeship (east-central Poland)
- Karczówka, Zwoleń County in Masovian Voivodeship (east-central Poland)
- Karczówka, Lubusz Voivodeship (west Poland)
