= Oporówek, Inowrocław County =

Oporówek
- Village
- Location within Poland
- Coordinates: 52°51′34″N 18°12′33″E
- Country: Poland
- Voivodeship: Kuyavian-Pomeranian
- County: Inowrocław
- Gmina: Inowrocław

Oporówek [ɔpɔˈruvɛk] is a village in the administrative district of Gmina Inowrocław, within Inowrocław County, Kuyavian-Pomeranian Voivodeship, in north-central Poland.
