= Warzyn =

- Village
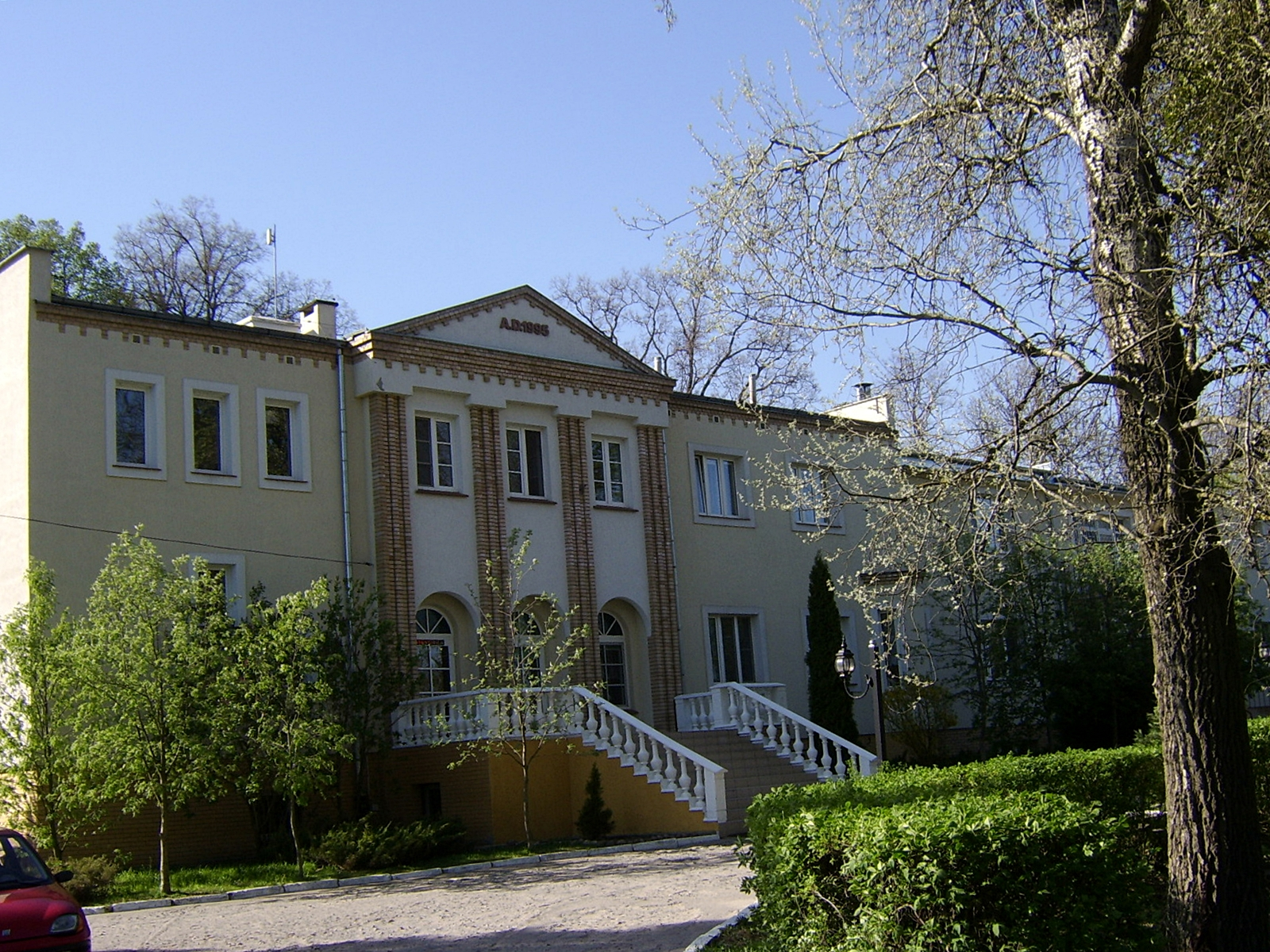

- Location within Poland
- Coordinates: 52°53′38″N 18°30′35″E
- Country: Poland
- Voivodeship: Kuyavian-Pomeranian
- County: Inowrocław
- Gmina: Gniewkowo

Warzyn [ˈvaʐɨn] is a village in the administrative district of Gmina Gniewkowo, within Inowrocław County, Kuyavian-Pomeranian Voivodeship, in north-central Poland.
