= Krążkowo =

Krążkowo may refer to the following places:

- Krążkowo, Kuyavian-Pomeranian Voivodeship (north-central Poland)
- Krążkowo, Lubusz Voivodeship (west Poland)
- Krążkowo, Pomeranian Voivodeship (north Poland)
