= Trzaski, Kuyavian-Pomeranian Voivodeship =

Trzaski
- Village
- Location within Poland
- Coordinates: 52°46′22″N 18°19′28″E
- Country: Poland
- Voivodeship: Kuyavian-Pomeranian
- County: Inowrocław
- Gmina: Inowrocław

Trzaski [ˈtʂaski] is a village in the administrative district of Gmina Inowrocław, within Inowrocław County, Kuyavian-Pomeranian Voivodeship, in north-central Poland.
