= Tupadły, Gmina Inowrocław =

Tupadły
- Village
- Location within Poland
- Coordinates: 52°44′36″N 18°15′08″E
- Country: Poland
- Voivodeship: Kuyavian-Pomeranian
- County: Inowrocław
- Gmina: Inowrocław

Tupadły [tuˈpadwɨ] is a village in the administrative district of Gmina Inowrocław, within Inowrocław County, Kuyavian-Pomeranian Voivodeship, in north-central Poland.
