= Tupadły, Gmina Złotniki Kujawskie =

Tupadły
- Village
- Location within Poland
- Coordinates: 52°55′14″N 18°10′32″E
- Country: Poland
- Voivodeship: Kuyavian-Pomeranian
- County: Inowrocław
- Gmina: Złotniki Kujawskie

Tupadły [tuˈpadwɨ] is a village in the administrative district of Gmina Złotniki Kujawskie, within Inowrocław County, Kuyavian-Pomeranian Voivodeship, in north-central Poland.
