= Askaukalis =

Historical region in Europe, exact location of which is debated

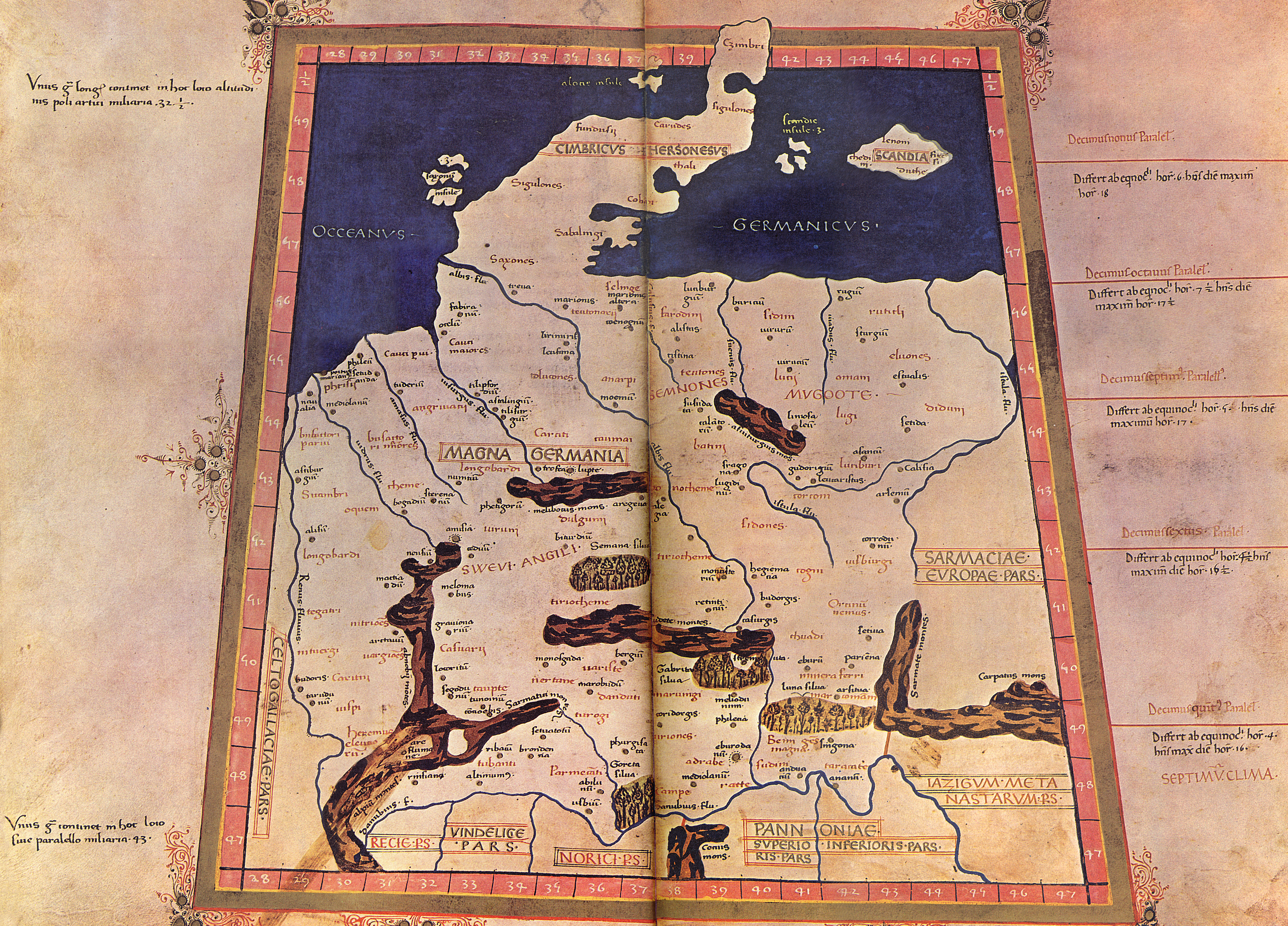
Magna Germania

Askaukalis (Greek ἀσκαυκαλίς, Latin Ascaucalis) was a place in Central Europe mentioned by Ptolemy in Geography (Γεωγραφικὴ Ὑφήγησις) and was one of 94 located on Magna Germania. The fourth map of Europe (Γερμανίας Μεγάλης θέσις, Εὐρώπης πίναξ δ´) was identified with today's Nakło on the Noteć, Bydgoszcz or Krusza Zamkowa.

== History ==
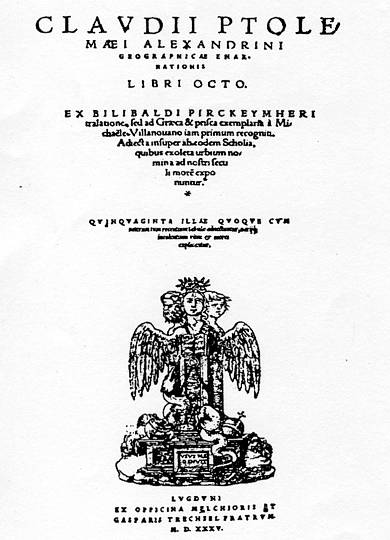
Title Page of Geography Published in 1535

Askaukalis was one of the settlements in the Gothic (Gothic-Gepid) state, known in Polish archeology as Wielbark culture. This country was founded on the territory of today's Poland in the first century CE by East Germanic tribes.

About 150 A.D. A Greek mathematician and astronomer, Ptolemy, who lived in Alexandria placed her on Magna Germania, the fourth map of Europe (Γερμανίας Μεγάλης θέσις, Εὐρώπης πίναξ δ´,) one of the 26 maps included in the famous Geography (Γεωγραφικὴ Ὑφήγησις.) The ancient researcher himself did not participate in the cartographic measurements that was needed to create them. He owed most of the information to merchants traversing the lands that he was interested in and to military cartographers of the Roman Empire.

== Research ==
Ptolemy, understandably, did not avoid errors resulting mainly from the need to transfer spherical reality to the map plane. He assumed that the countries between the Baltic Sea and the Danube were much narrower, which meant that places from such a distant past were extremely difficult to identify on modern maps. What's more, he was wrong in pointing out the location not only of places difficult to locate but also of such characteristic locations as, for example, Jutland or Schleswig-Holstein.

At the Institute of Geodesy and Geoinformation at Technische Universität Berlin, a group of scientists consisting of classical philologists, mathematicians and cartographers made an attempt to correct these errors and developed the so-called "Geodetic deformation analysis." On its basis, a list of cities (poleis) from Magna Germania was created with their assumed locations in today's Germany and Poland. According to Berlin scientists, these locations also correspond to archaeological sites in which Gothic settlements and burial sites were previously discovered. Also research in Bydgoszcz confirmed that in that period, due to its convenient location and easy crossing through the Brda, there was a significant development of settlements related to lively trade contacts with the Roman Empire through the Amber Road. Askaukalis was included in the so-called group 3, in which the settlements were located. Furthermore, settlements in this group were in the place of today's cities. However, as a result of mass migrations in the late antiquity they are not their direct precursors due to the lack of settlement continuity.

== See also ==
- The History of Bydgoszcz until 1346
- Aleksandra Cofta-Broniewska

== Bibliography ==
=== Documents ===
- Thayer, Bill. "Ptolemy: the Geography". penelope.uchicago.edu.
- Ptolemy (150). "Cosmography of Ptolemy's Alexandria". Polona (in Polish).
- "List of Most Viewed Publications & Thematic Collections". Polona (in Polish). November 23, 2006. Archived from the original on April 16, 2012.

=== Referenced works ===
- Pierer, Heinrich August (1857–65). Pierer's Universal Lexicon of the Past and Present or, Latest Encyclopedic Dictionary of Sciences, Arts and Crafts (4th ed.). Altenburg. OCLC 704310746.
- Ostoja-Zagórski, Janusz (2005). The Oldest History of Polish Lands. Bydgoszcz: The Publishing House of the Bydgoszcz Academy. ISBN 8370965547. OCLC 749680625.
- Wilke, Gerard (1991–2015). "Prehistory and Early Middle Ages in the Light of Archaeological Sources (until the Beginning of the 12th Century)". In Biskup, Marian; Naukowe, Bydgoskie Towarzystwo (eds.). History of Bydgoszcz. Vol. I. Warsaw: State Publishing House, Sciences. ISBN 8301066660. OCLC 27641385.
- Dygaszewicz, Elżbieta (2000). "From Paleolithic to the Middle Ages". Bydgoszcz Calendar. Bydgoszcz: Society for the Lovers of Bydgoszcz City. ISSN 0209-3081. OCLC 1150533527.
- Kleineberg, Andreas; Marx, Christian; Lelgemann, Dieter; Knobloch, Eberhard, eds. (2010). Germania and the Island of Thule: The Deciphering of Ptolemy's "Atlas of the Oikumene". Darmstadt: Scientific Book Society. ISBN 9783534721795. OCLC 867205783.
