= Kłopot, Kuyavian-Pomeranian Voivodeship =

Kłopot
- Village
- Location within Poland
- Coordinates: 52°49′5.11″N 18°16′0.16″E
- Country: Poland
- Voivodeship: Kuyavian-Pomeranian
- County: Inowrocław
- Gmina: Inowrocław

Kłopot [ˈkwɔpɔt] (translation: Trouble) is a village in the administrative district of Gmina Inowrocław, within Inowrocław County, Kuyavian-Pomeranian Voivodeship, in north-central Poland.
