= Jaksice, Kuyavian-Pomeranian Voivodeship =

Jaksice
- Village
- Location within Poland
- Coordinates: 52°52′N 18°12′E
- Country: Poland
- Voivodeship: Kuyavian-Pomeranian
- County: Inowrocław
- Gmina: Inowrocław
- Population: 1,200

Jaksice [jakˈɕit͡sɛ] (German: Jakschitz) is a village in the administrative district of Gmina Inowrocław, within Inowrocław County, Kuyavian-Pomeranian Voivodeship, in north-central Poland.
