= Kijewo, Kuyavian-Pomeranian Voivodeship =

Kijewo
- Village
- Location within Poland
- Coordinates: 52°52′N 18°31′E
- Country: Poland
- Voivodeship: Kuyavian-Pomeranian
- County: Inowrocław
- Gmina: Gniewkowo

Kijewo [kiˈjɛvɔ] is a village in the administrative district of Gmina Gniewkowo, within Inowrocław County, Kuyavian-Pomeranian Voivodeship, in north-central Poland.
