= Złotniki Kujawskie =

- Village
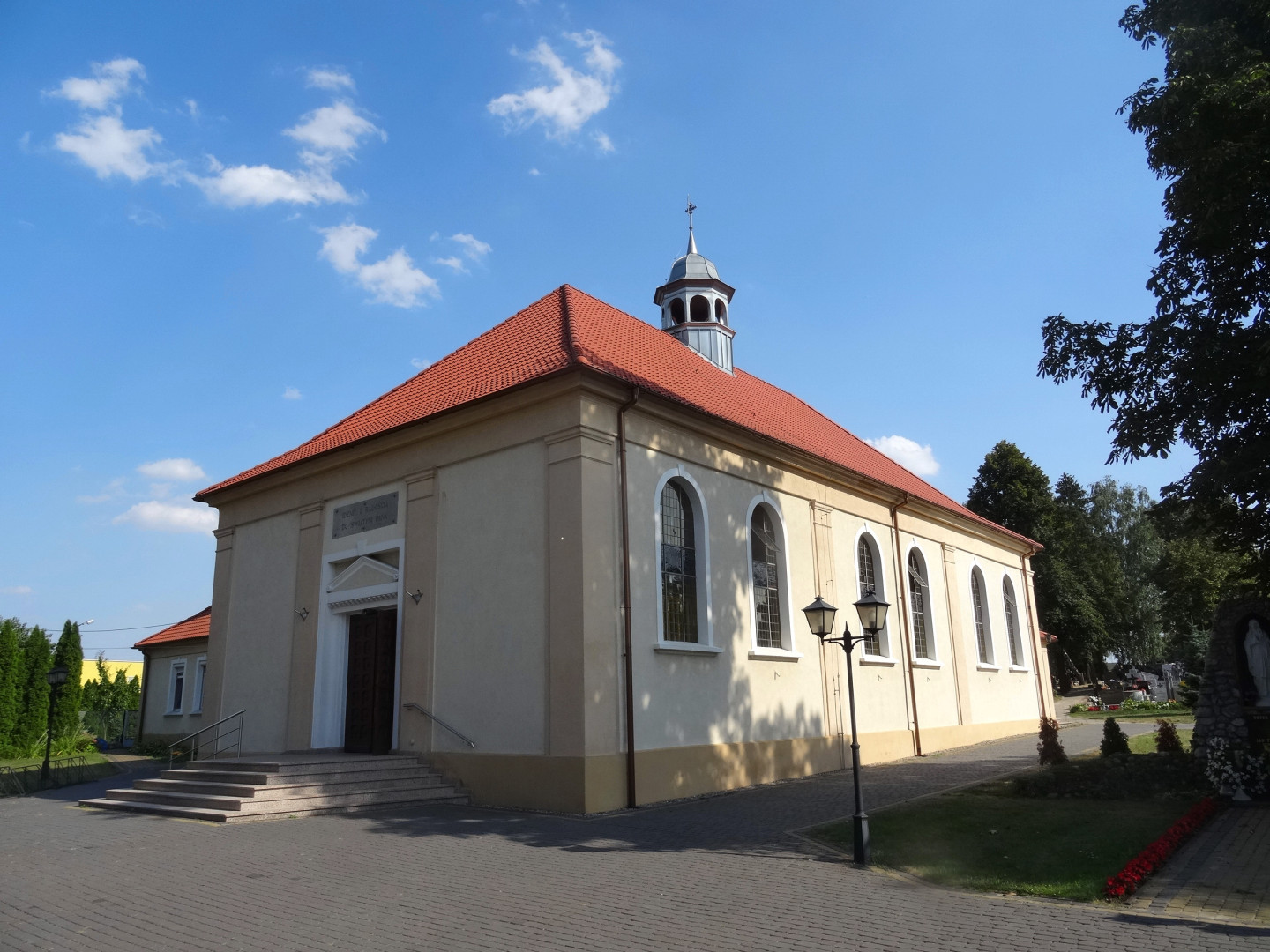
- Church of Saints Andrew and Anthony

- Location within Poland
- Coordinates: 52°54′N 18°8′E
- Country: Poland
- Voivodeship: Kuyavian-Pomeranian
- County: Inowrocław
- Gmina: Złotniki Kujawskie
- Population: 2,400

Złotniki Kujawskie [zwɔtˈniki kuˈjafskʲɛ] (German: Güldenhof) is a village in Inowrocław County, Kuyavian-Pomeranian Voivodeship, in north-central Poland. It is the seat of the gmina (administrative district) called Gmina Złotniki Kujawskie.
