= Gmina Inowrocław =

Gmina Inowrocław Inowrocław Commune
- Gmina
- Coat of arms
- Interactive map of Gmina Inowrocław
- Coordinates (Inowrocław): 52°47′35″N 18°15′40″E
- Country: Poland
- Voivodeship: Kuyavian-Pomeranian
- County: Inowrocław
- Seat: Inowrocław

Area
  - Total: 171.05 km^{2} (66.04 sq mi)

Population (2006)
  - Total: 11,106
  - Density: 64.928/km^{2} (168.16/sq mi)

Gmina Inowrocław is a rural gmina (administrative district) in Inowrocław County, Kuyavian-Pomeranian Voivodeship, in north-central Poland. Its seat is the town of Inowrocław, although the town is not part of the territory of the gmina.

The gmina covers an area of 171.05 square kilometres (66.0 sq mi), and as of 2006 its total population is 11,106.

== Villages ==
Gmina Inowrocław contains the villages and settlements of Balczewo, Balin, Batkowo, Borkowo, Cieślin, Czyste, Dulsk, Dziennice, Gnojno, Góra, Jacewo, Jaksice, Jaksiczki, Jaronty, Karczyn-Wieś, Kłopot, Komaszyce, Kruśliwiec, Krusza Duchowna, Krusza Podlotowa, Krusza Zamkowa, Łąkocin, Latkowo, Łojewo, Marcinkowo, Marulewy, Miechowice, Mimowola, Olszewice, Oporówek, Orłowo, Ostrowo Krzyckie, Piotrkowice, Pławin, Pławinek, Popowice, Radłówek, Sikorowo, Sławęcin, Sławęcinek, Słońsko, Sójkowo, Stefanowo, Strzemkowo, Trzaski, Tupadły, Turlejewo, Turzany, Witowy and Żalinowo.

== Neighbouring gminas ==
Gmina Inowrocław is bordered by the town of Inowrocław and by the gminas of Dąbrowa Biskupia, Gniewkowo, Janikowo, Kruszwica, Pakość, Rojewo, Strzelno and Złotniki Kujawskie.
