= Gmina Złotniki Kujawskie =

Gmina Złotniki Kujawskie Złotniki Kujawskie Commune
- Gmina
- Coat of arms
- Interactive map of Gmina Złotniki Kujawskie
- Coordinates (Złotniki Kujawskie): 52°54′N 18°8′E
- Country: Poland
- Voivodeship: Kuyavian-Pomeranian
- County: Inowrocław
- Seat: Złotniki Kujawskie

Area
  - Total: 135.6 km^{2} (52.4 sq mi)

Population (2006)
  - Total: 8,947
  - Density: 65.98/km^{2} (170.9/sq mi)
- Website: http://www.zlotnikikuj.cc.pl

Gmina Złotniki Kujawskie is a rural gmina (administrative district) in Inowrocław County, Kuyavian-Pomeranian Voivodeship, in north-central Poland. Its seat is the village of Złotniki Kujawskie, which lies approximately 15 kilometres (9 mi) north-west of Inowrocław, 26 km (16 mi) south of Bydgoszcz, and 36 km (22 mi) south-west of Toruń.

The gmina covers an area of 135.6 square kilometres (52.4 sq mi), and as of 2006 its total population is 8,947.

== Villages ==
Gmina Złotniki Kujawskie contains the villages and settlements of Będzitówek, Będzitowo, Będzitowskie Huby, Broniewo, Bronimierz Mały, Bronimierz Wielki, Dąbrówka Kujawska, Dobrogościce, Dźwierzchno, Gniewkówiec, Helenowo, Ignacewo, Jordanowo, Karczówka, Kobelniki, Krążkowo, Krężoły, Leszcze, Lisewo Kościelne, Mierzwin, Niszczewice, Palczyn, Pęchowo, Podgaj, Popowiczki, Rucewko, Rucewo, Tarkowo Górne, Tuczno, Tuczno-Wieś, Tupadły, Złotniczki and Złotniki Kujawskie.

== Neighbouring gminas ==
Gmina Złotniki Kujawskie is bordered by the gminas of Barcin, Inowrocław, Łabiszyn, Nowa Wieś Wielka, Pakość and Rojewo.
