= Gmina Gniewkowo =

Gmina Gniewkowo Gniewkowo Commune
- Gmina
- Coat of arms
- Interactive map of Gmina Gniewkowo
- Coordinates (Gniewkowo): 52°54′N 18°25′E
- Country: Poland
- Voivodeship: Kuyavian-Pomeranian
- County: Inowrocław
- Seat: Gniewkowo

Area
  - Total: 179.44 km^{2} (69.28 sq mi)

Population (2006)
  - Total: 14,719
  - Density: 82.027/km^{2} (212.45/sq mi)
  - Urban: 7,254
  - Rural: 7,465
- Website: gniewkowo.bazagmin.pl

Gmina Gniewkowo is an urban-rural gmina (administrative district) in Inowrocław County, Kuyavian-Pomeranian Voivodeship, in north-central Poland. Its seat is the town of Gniewkowo, which lies approximately 16 kilometres (10 mi) north-east of Inowrocław and 20 km (12 mi) south-west of Toruń.

The gmina covers an area of 179.44 square kilometres (69.3 sq mi), and as of 2006 its total population is 14,719 (out of which the population of Gniewkowo amounts to 7,254, and the population of the rural part of the gmina is 7,465).

== Villages ==
Apart from the town of Gniewkowo, Gmina Gniewkowo contains the villages and settlements of Bąbolin, Branno, Buczkowo, Chrząstowo, Dąblin, Gąski, Godzięba, Kaczkowo, Kawęczyn, Kępa Kujawska, Kijewo, Klepary, Lipie, Markowo, Murzynko, Murzynno, Ostrowo and Warzyn.

== Neighbouring gminas ==
Gmina Gniewkowo is bordered by the gminas of Aleksandrów Kujawski, Dąbrowa Biskupia, Inowrocław, Rojewo and Wielka Nieszawka.
