= Inowrocław County =

Inowrocław County Powiat inowrocławski
- County
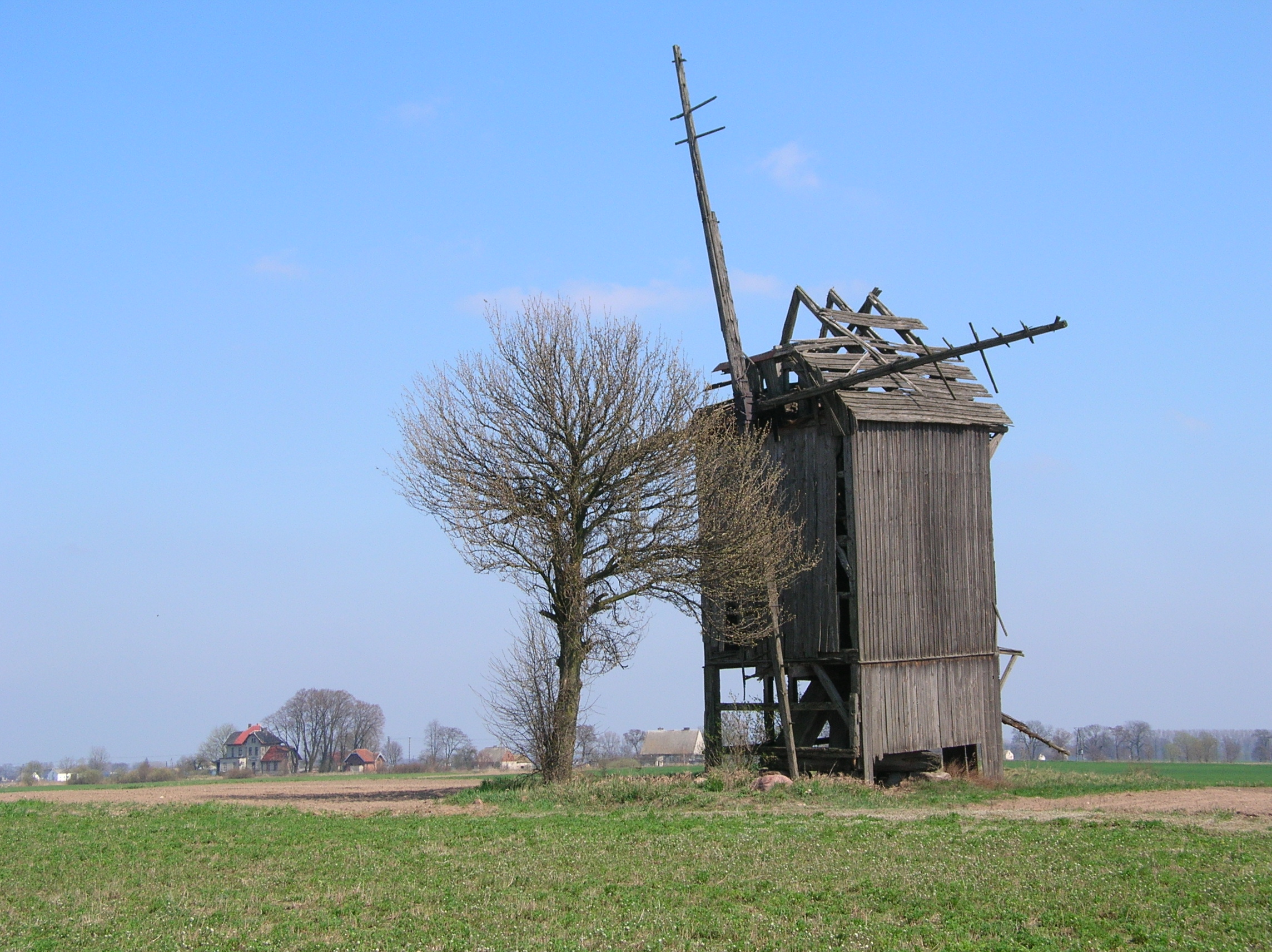

- Flag Coat of arms

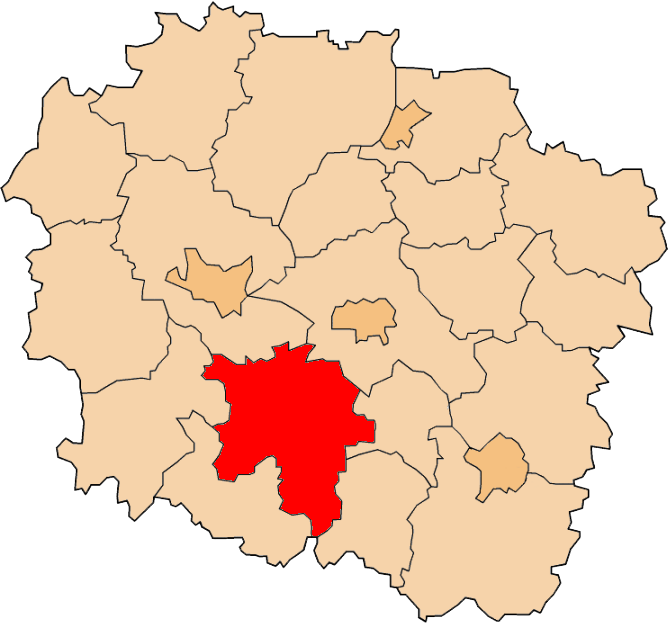
- Location within the voivodeship
- Coordinates (Inowrocław): 52°47′35″N 18°15′40″E
- Country: Poland
- Voivodeship: Kuyavian-Pomeranian
- Seat: Inowrocław
- Gminas: Total 9 (incl. 1 urban): Inowrocław; Gmina Dąbrowa Biskupia; Gmina Gniewkowo; Gmina Inowrocław; Gmina Janikowo; Gmina Kruszwica; Gmina Pakość; Gmina Rojewo; Gmina Złotniki Kujawskie

Area
  - Total: 1,224.94 km^{2} (472.95 sq mi)

Population (2019)
  - Total: 160,216
  - Density: 130.795/km^{2} (338.757/sq mi)
  - Urban: 103,156
  - Rural: 57,060
- Car plates: CIN
- Website: www.inowroclaw.powiat.pl

Inowrocław County (Polish: powiat inowrocławski) is a unit of territorial administration and local government (powiat) in Kuyavian-Pomeranian Voivodeship, north-central Poland. It came into being on January 1, 1999, as a result of the Polish local government reforms passed in 1998. Its administrative seat and largest town is Inowrocław, which lies 36 km (22 mi) south-west of Toruń and 40 km (25 mi) south-east of Bydgoszcz. The county contains four other towns: Kruszwica, lying 14 km (9 mi) south of Inowrocław, Janikowo, lying 12 km (7 mi) south-west of Inowrocław, Gniewkowo, 16 km (10 mi) north-east of Inowrocław, and Pakość, 13 km (8 mi) west of Inowrocław.

The county covers an area of 1,224.94 square kilometres (473.0 sq mi). As of 2019 its total population is 165,237, out of which the population of Inowrocław is 72,786, that of Kruszwica is 8,809, that of Janikowo is 8,745, that of Gniewkowo is 7,110, that of Pakość is 5,706, and the rural population is 57,060.

== Neighbouring counties ==
Inowrocław County is bordered by Bydgoszcz County to the north, Toruń County to the north-east, Aleksandrów County to the east, Radziejów County to the south-east, Konin County to the south, Mogilno County to the south-west and Żnin County to the west.

== Administrative divisions ==
The county is subdivided into nine gminas (one urban, four urban-rural and four rural). These are listed in the following table, in descending order of population.

Gmina	Type	Area (km^{2})	Population (2019)	Seat
Inowrocław	urban	30.4	72,786	
Gmina Kruszwica	urban-rural	262.2	19,245	Kruszwica
Gmina Gniewkowo	urban-rural	179.4	14,392	Gniewkowo
Gmina Janikowo	urban-rural	92.3	13,151	Janikowo
Gmina Inowrocław	rural	171.1	11,808	Inowrocław *
Gmina Pakość	urban-rural	86.3	9,766	Pakość
Gmina Złotniki Kujawskie	rural	135.6	9,194	Złotniki Kujawskie
Gmina Dąbrowa Biskupia	rural	147.4	5,112	Dąbrowa Biskupia
Gmina Rojewo	rural	120.2	4,762	Rojewo
* seat not part of the gmina
