= Płonkowo =

- Village
- Location within Poland
- Coordinates: 52°54′N 18°17′E
- Country: Poland
- Voivodeship: Kuyavian-Pomeranian
- County: Inowrocław
- Gmina: Rojewo

Płonkowo [pwɔŋˈkɔvɔ] is a village in the administrative district of Gmina Rojewo, within Inowrocław County, Kuyavian-Pomeranian Voivodeship, in north-central Poland.

Płonkowo was mentioned as "Płomykowa" in a letter written in 1297 by Jarosław, Castellan of Słonsk, and in another letter written about 1304 by Jan, voivode of Brzesc-Kujawy. Jan of Płonkowo, sometime Castellan of Wyszogród, witnessed a document dated October 12, 1314.

About 1580, Jedrzej Kaczkowski owned the village. In 1638, Kasper Działynski, Bishop of Chełm, donated the village to the Jesuits in Bydgoszcz. The parish included: Dobiesławice, Glinno, Kaczkowo, Mierogonowice, Płonkowko, Rojewo, Sciborze, Topola, and Wierzchosławice. These villages appeared in the parish later: Dąbie; Glinienko (alias Glinki or Klein Glinnen); Godzieba, Janska Wies; Jedrejowo; Jezuicka Struga; Jurek; Kaczkowska Nowa Wies (alias Kaczkower Neudorf); Kamienny Brod; Kepa; Lukaszewo, Racławice; Wolanow; and Wybranowo. In 1873 the parish numbered 1,163 people.

Płonkowo belonged to the manor of Kaczkowo. In 1663, Stanisław Tuczyński sold Kaczkowo, Skalmierowice, Mierogonowice, Jędrzejewo, Glinno, and Olęndry to Tomasz Przetocki. In 1670, Przetocki sold the manor to Bishop Stanisław Dąmbski (ca. 1638–1700). At his death, the manor included Płonkowo and seven other villages. The bishop's brother, Zygmunt Dąmbski, Count of Lubraniec, inherited the manor. The manor then passed to Zygmunt's son, Wojciech Dąmbski, in 1706, and on to Wojciech's son, Antoni Dąmbski, in 1725. Antoni sold the manor to his brother-in-law (and third cousin) Kazimierz Dąmbski, in 1741. Kazimierz's son, Jan Chrziciel Dąmbski, Count of Lubraniec, inherited the manor in 1765. He was living at Kaczkowo in 1812, when foreign troops from Württemberg destroyed the palace. In 1831, Jan Chrziciel's elder son, Apolinary Dąmbski, inherited Kaczkowo, while his younger son, Kazimierz (whose right to the title "Count Dombski" was recognized by the Prussian government in 1821) inherited Płonkowo. He died in 1833, leaving two daughters and a son, Stanislaw Kostka, who had no issue. By 1887, the village was owned by Feliks Goczkowski.

In 1887, Płonkowo had nine houses, and 143 inhabitants (of whom one was a Protestant), as well a vicarage consisting of two houses and 29 inhabitants. The village had an area of 377.80 hectares, of which 326.22 hectares were farms, 20.33 were meadow, 21.39 were pasture, 9.62 were wasteland, and 0.24 was water.

A church dedicated to Maksymilian Maria Kolbe and the First Polish Martyrs is located in Płonkowo. The building was constructed in the 1980s, when the parish priest was Jozef Sołtysiak. The church contains the remains of Marian Skrzypczak, who was shot in Płonkowo in 1939 by Hitler youth, and was beatified by Pope John Paul II in 1999.

From 1975 to 1998, Płonkowo belonged to the Bydgoszcz voivodeship.
