= Kreis Hohensalza =

Coordinates: 52°47′57″N 18°15′22″E

Location of Kreis Hohensalza (1910)

Kreis Hohensalza ([ˌhoːənˈzalt͡sa]) was one of many Kreise (districts) in the northern administrative region of Bromberg, in the Prussian province of Posen from 1815 to 1919. Its capital was Hohensalza (Inowrocław).

== History ==
Kreis Hohensalza, known as Kreis Inowrazlaw until 1904, was a Kreis (district) in the northern administrative region of Bromberg, in the Prussian province of Posen. It was located within the Bromberg Government Region, first in the Grand Duchy of Posen (1815-1848, in personal union with Prussia) and then in the Prussian Province of Posen (1848-1919). On 18 January 1871 the Kreis, along with all of Prussia, became part of Germany. Kreis Hohensalza was part of the military command (German: Bezirkskommando) at Hohensalza (Inowrocław). The main regional court (German: Landgericht) was in Bromberg (Bydgoszcz), with a magistrate's court (German: Amtsgericht) in the capital city Hohensalza (Inowrocław).

On 1 July 1886 southern areas of the district were separated and became part of the new Kreis Strelno. The capital city, formerly known as Inowrazlaw, was renamed Hohensalza on 5 December 1904, and the county name also changed by default. In the course of the Greater Poland uprising in 1919, the southern part of the district came under Polish control, while the northern part with Argenau (Gniewkowo) remained under German control. Following the Treaty of Versailles in July 1919, Germany also ceded the northern part of the district to Poland between 17 January and 4 February 1920. The territory then became part of the Second Polish Republic.

During World War II, the territory of the former Kreis was annexed by Nazi Germany and Landkreis Hohensalza (Wartheland) was established, which existed from 1939 to 1945.

== Demographics ==
The district had a Polish majority population, with a significant German minority.

Ethnolinguistic structure of Kreis Hohensalza
Year	Population	German		Polish / Bilingual / Other	
1905	74,716	27,035	36.2%	47,681	63.8%
1910	77,294	28,394	36.7%	48,900	63.3%

== Standesämter ==
Standesamt is the German name of the local/municipal civil registration offices which were established in October 1874 soon after the German Empire was formed. Births, marriages and deaths were recorded. Previously, only duplicate copies of church records were used. By 1905, Kreis Hohensalza had the following 15 offices for rural residents:

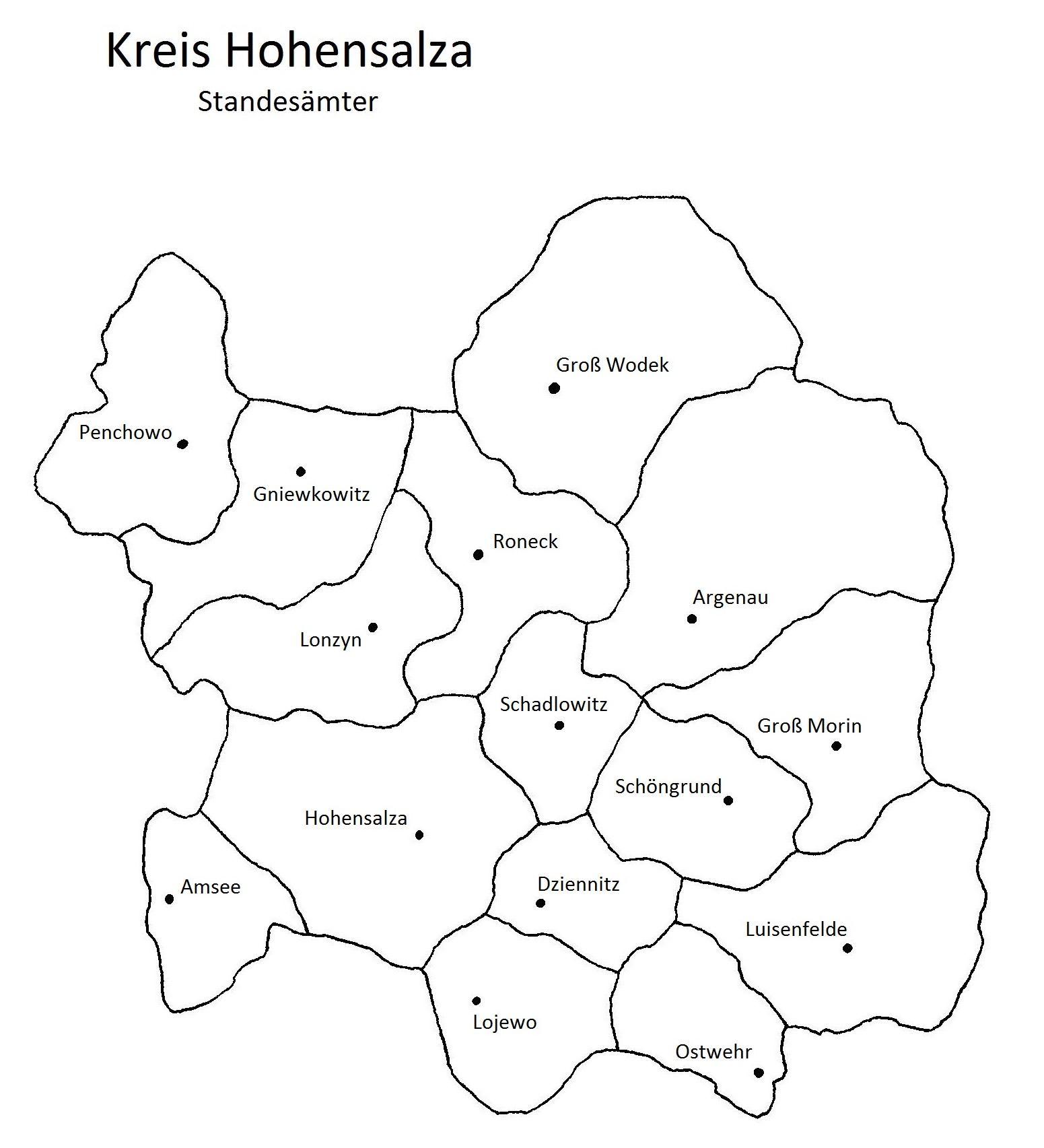
The standesämter districts of Kreis Hohensalza, Provinz Posen, Prussia/Germany

Standesamt	Polish Name
Amsee	Janikowo
Argenau	Gniewkowo
Dziennitz	Dziennice
Gniewkowitz	Gniewkówiec
Groß Morin	Murzynno
Groß Wodek	Osiek Wielki
Hohensalza	Inowrocław
Lohdorf / Lojewo	Łojewo
Lonzyn	Łążyn
Luisenfelde	Dąbrowa Biskupia
Ostwehr	Konary
Penchowo	Pęchowo
Roneck	Rojewo
Schadlowitz	Szadłowice
Schöngrund	Szpital

Amsee district was created in 1887 from Hohensalza district. Dziennitz district was created in 1890 from Lojewo district, Ostwehr district was created from Lojewo and Luisenfelde districts, and Schöngrund district was created from Gross Morin and Luisenfelde districts. Roneck district was created in 1905 from Argenau and Gross Wodek districts. In addition, the following cities were separate districts for urban residents: Hohensalza, Argenau.

== List of communities ==
Communities	Polish Name	Standesamt
Amsee	Janikowo	Amsee
Groß Koluda	Kołuda Wielka	Amsee
Klein Koluda	Kołuda Mała	Amsee
Michalinowo	Michalinowo	Amsee
Ostrowo	Ostrowo	Amsee
Schellstein	Sielec	Amsee
Sieczkowice	Sieczkowice	Amsee
Wengierce	Węgierce	Amsee
Wiesenfelde	Gebnia	Amsee
Bärenberg	Leśnictwo Niedźwiadki	Argenau
Bombolin	Bąbolin	Argenau
Buczkowo	Buczkowo	Argenau
Dombken	Dąblin	Argenau
Eichthal		Argenau
Fahnenberg (Note: See under Schirpitz in Meyers.)	Chorągiewka	Argenau
Großendorf		Argenau
Jakobskrug	Suche Piaski	Argenau
Kunkel	Małe Jarki	Argenau
Lipie	Lipie	Argenau
Ludwigsruh	Chrząstowo	Argenau
Michalowo	Michałowo	Argenau
Ostrowo	Ostrowo	Argenau
Perkowo	Perkowo	Argenau
Ruhheide		Argenau
Schirpitz Kolonie	Cierpiszewo	Argenau
Seedorf	Zajezierze	Argenau
Suchatowko [Polnisch]	Suchatówka Zajezierze	Argenau
Truszczysna	Truszczyzna	Argenau
Unterwalde	Podlesie	Argenau
Waldow	Perkowo Górne	Argenau
Wielowies	Wielowieś	Argenau
Wierschoslawitz	Wierzchosławice	Argenau
Zadrosch		Argenau
Balzweiler	Balczewo	Dziennitz
Dziennitz	Dziennice	Dziennitz
Jaronty	Jaronty	Dziennitz
Komaszyce	Komaszyce	Dziennitz
Martinsau	Marcinkowo	Dziennitz
Plawinek	Pławinek	Dziennitz
Schönwiese	Niemojewo	Dziennitz
Trzask	Trzaski	Dziennitz
Turzany	Turzany	Dziennitz
Broniewo	Broniewo	Gniewkowitz
Dobrogoschütz	Dobrogościce	Gniewkowitz
Gniewkowitz	Gniewkówiec	Gniewkowitz
Groß Werdershausen	Bronimierz Wielki	Gniewkowitz
Güldenhof	Złotniki Kujawskie	Gniewkowitz
Jordanowo	Jordanowo	Gniewkowitz
Jordanowo Hauland		Gniewkowitz
Kaisertreu	Dźwierzchno	Gniewkowitz
Klein Werdershausen	Bronimierz Mały	Gniewkowitz
Kobelniki	Kobelniki	Gniewkowitz
Krenzoly	Krężoły	Gniewkowitz
Leszcz	Leszcze	Gniewkowitz
Mierzwin	Mierzwin	Gniewkowitz
Milchhof	Karczówka	Gniewkowitz
Nischwitz	Niszczewice	Gniewkowitz
Rucewo	Rucewo	Gniewkowitz
Tannhofen	Tarkowo Górne	Gniewkowitz
Tannhofen [Hauland]	Tarkowo Dolne	Gniewkowitz
Tupadly	Tupadły	Gniewkowitz
Woydahl	Wojdal	Gniewkowitz
Alt Grabia	Stare Grabie	Groß Morin
Branno	Branno	Groß Morin
Dembiniek	Dębiniec	Groß Morin
Ernsthausen	Bystronowice Klepary	Groß Morin
Groß Morin	Murzynno	Groß Morin
Kawentschin	Kawęczyn	Groß Morin
Kijewo	Kijewo	Groß Morin
Klein Morin	Murzynko	Groß Morin
Klein Opok	Opoczki	Groß Morin
Klepary	Klepary	Groß Morin
Kopcowko		Groß Morin
Markowo	Markowo	Groß Morin
Neudorf	Żyrosławice	Groß Morin
Osniszewko	Ośniszczewko	Groß Morin
Osniszewo	Ośniszczewo	Groß Morin
Reichsmark	Gęzewo	Groß Morin
Warin	Warzyn	Groß Morin
Wierzbiczany	Wierzbiczany	Groß Morin
Wygoda		Groß Morin
Altendorf	Stara Wieś	Groß Wodek
Bismarckstreu	Glinki	Groß Wodek
Erika	Magdaleniec	Groß Wodek
Getau [Forsthaus]	Gajtowo	Groß Wodek
Grätz [Forsthaus]	Grodzyna	Groß Wodek
Groß Wodek	Osiek Wielki	Groß Wodek
Grünfließ	Leśnictwo Zielona	Groß Wodek
Grünkirch	Rojewice	Groß Wodek
Grüntal	Glinno Wielkie	Groß Wodek
Grünweiler	Zawiszyn	Groß Wodek
Jarken	Jarki	Groß Wodek
Jesuiterbruch	Jezuicka Struga	Groß Wodek
Kienberg	Chojnaty	Groß Wodek
Klein Wodek	Osieczek	Groß Wodek
Steinfurt	Bród Kamienny	Groß Wodek
Waldeshausen	Jurek	Groß Wodek
Weißenberg		Groß Wodek
Wodek	Osiek	Groß Wodek
Wodek [Forsthaus]	Jarzębiec	Groß Wodek
Balino	Balin	Hohensalza
Batkowo	Batkowo	Hohensalza
Cieslin	Cieślin	Hohensalza
Daheim	Dalkowo	Hohensalza
Dziarnowo	Dziarnowo	Hohensalza
Friedrichsfelde	Marulewy	Hohensalza
Gnoyno	Gnojno	Hohensalza
Gorschen	Gorzany	Hohensalza
Jazewo	Jacewo	Hohensalza
Königgrätz	Miechowiczki	Hohensalza
Koscielec	Kościelec	Hohensalza
Kruschlewitz	Kruśliwiec	Hohensalza
Leschütz	Leszczyce	Hohensalza
Milchhöfen	Miechowice	Hohensalza
Mimowola	Mimowola	Hohensalza
Montwy	Mątwy	Hohensalza
Olschewitz	Olszewice	Hohensalza
Orlowo	Orłowo	Hohensalza
Popowitz	Popowice	Hohensalza
Radlowek	Radłówek	Hohensalza
Ritschersewko	Rycerzewko	Hohensalza
Rombino	Rąbin	Hohensalza
Rübenau	Kłopot	Hohensalza
Rycerzewo	Rycerzewo	Hohensalza
Slabencin	Sławęcin	Hohensalza
Slabencinek	Sławęcinek	Hohensalza
Soykowo	Sójkowo	Hohensalza
Szymborze	Szymborze	Hohensalza
Thomaberg	Mikorzyn	Hohensalza
Dulsk	Dulsk	Lojewo
Gora	Góra	Lojewo
Karczyn	Karczyn	Lojewo
Königswerder		Lojewo
Lojewo	Łojewo	Lojewo
Lonkocin	Łąkocin	Lojewo
Scharley	Szarlej	Lojewo
Scharley gaj	Arturowo	Lojewo
Scharley Ostrow	Ostrowo Krzyckie	Lojewo
Sikorowo	Sikorowo	Lojewo
Witowy	Witowy	Lojewo
Borkowo	Borkowo	Lonzyn
Budziaki	Budziaki	Lonzyn
Helenowo	Helenowo	Lonzyn
Jakschitz	Jaksice	Lonzyn
Klein Jakschitz	Jaksiczki	Lonzyn
Lischkowo	Liszkowo	Lonzyn
Lischkowo wola	Wola Liszkowska	Lonzyn
Lonzyn (Note: See under Jakschitz in Meyers.)	Łążyn	Lonzyn
Oporowek	Oporówek	Lonzyn
Plawin	Pławin	Lonzyn
Podgaj	Podgaj	Lonzyn
Popowitzki	Popowiczki	Lonzyn
Römershof	Łącko	Lonzyn
Strzemkowo	Strzemkowo	Lonzyn
Tuczno	Tuczno	Lonzyn
Wibrannowo	Wybranowo	Lonzyn
Bonkowo	Bądkowo	Luisenfelde
Brudnia	Brudnia	Luisenfelde
Chrostowo	Chróstowo	Luisenfelde
Elsenheim	Wilkostowo	Luisenfelde
Groß Opok	Opoki	Luisenfelde
Kleinwiese	Chlewiska	Luisenfelde
Luisenfelde	Dąbrowa Biskupia	Luisenfelde
Neuhof	Nowy Dwór	Luisenfelde
Przybyslaw	Przybysław	Luisenfelde
Reinau	Rejna	Luisenfelde
Schönau	Wola Stanomińska	Luisenfelde
Standau	Stanomin	Luisenfelde
Treumark	Mleczkowo	Luisenfelde
Walentinowo	Walentynowo	Luisenfelde
Zduny	Zduny	Luisenfelde
Dziewa	Dziewa	Ostwehr
Freitagsheim	Pieranie	Ostwehr
Gloykowo	Głojkowo	Ostwehr
Ostwehr	Konary	Ostwehr
Pieczysk	Pieczyska	Ostwehr
Radewitz	Radojewice	Ostwehr
Sobiesiernie	Sobiesiernie	Ostwehr
Bendzitowko	Będzitówek	Penchowo
Bendzitowo	Będzitowo	Penchowo
Brühlsdorf (Adlig)	Prądocin [Szlacheckie]	Penchowo
Dombrowken	Dąbrówka Kujawska	Penchowo
Friedrichskron	Krążkowo	Penchowo
Ignacewo	Ignacewo	Penchowo
Jakobsdorf	Jakubowo	Penchowo
Johannisthal	Januszkowo	Penchowo
Julianowo	Julianowo	Penchowo
Karolinenhain		Penchowo
Liebensee	Lisewo Kościelne	Penchowo
Lissewko	Lisewek	Penchowo
Minutsdorf	Dziemionna	Penchowo
Mochellek	Mochelek	Penchowo
Mochellek Hauland		Penchowo
Netzfeld	Kolankowo	Penchowo
Palczyn	Palczyn	Penchowo
Penchowo	Pęchowo	Penchowo
Rucewko	Rucewko	Penchowo
Bergbruch	Liszkowice	Roneck
Czyste	Czyste	Roneck
Johannisdorf	Leśnianki	Roneck
Kaczkowo	Kaczkowo	Roneck
Kempa	Kępa Kujawska	Roneck
Lukaschewo	Łukaszewo	Roneck
Neulinden	Jurańcice	Roneck
Oberwalde	Godzięba	Roneck
Plonkhöfen	Płonkówko	Roneck
Plonkowo	Płonkowo	Roneck
Roneck	Rojewo	Roneck
Sanddorf	Jaszczołtowo	Roneck
Sciborze	Ściborze	Roneck
Topola	Topola	Roneck
Waldesruh	Dąbie	Roneck
Zelechlin	Żelechlin	Roneck
Dobieslawitz	Dobiesławice	Schadlowitz
Edwinshof	Edwinowo	Schadlowitz
Latkowo	Latkowo	Schadlowitz
Mierogoniewtiz	Mierogonowice	Schadlowitz
Schadlowitz	Szadłowice	Schadlowitz
Skalmierowitz	Skalmierowice	Schadlowitz
Slonsk	Słońsko	Schadlowitz
Wienslawitz	Więcławice	Schadlowitz
Deutschwalde	Modliborzyce	Schöngrund
Eigenheim	Lipionka	Schöngrund
Forbach	Zagajewiczki	Schöngrund
Gonsk	Gąski	Schöngrund
Ostburg	Wonorze	Schöngrund
Parchanie	Parchanie	Schöngrund
Parzellen (Note: See under Parchanie in Meyers.)	Parchanki	Schöngrund
Schöngrund	Szpital	Schöngrund
Szrubsk	Śrubsk	Schöngrund
Zagajewitz	Zagajewice	Schöngrund
