= Kaczkowo, Inowrocław County =

Kaczkowo
- Village
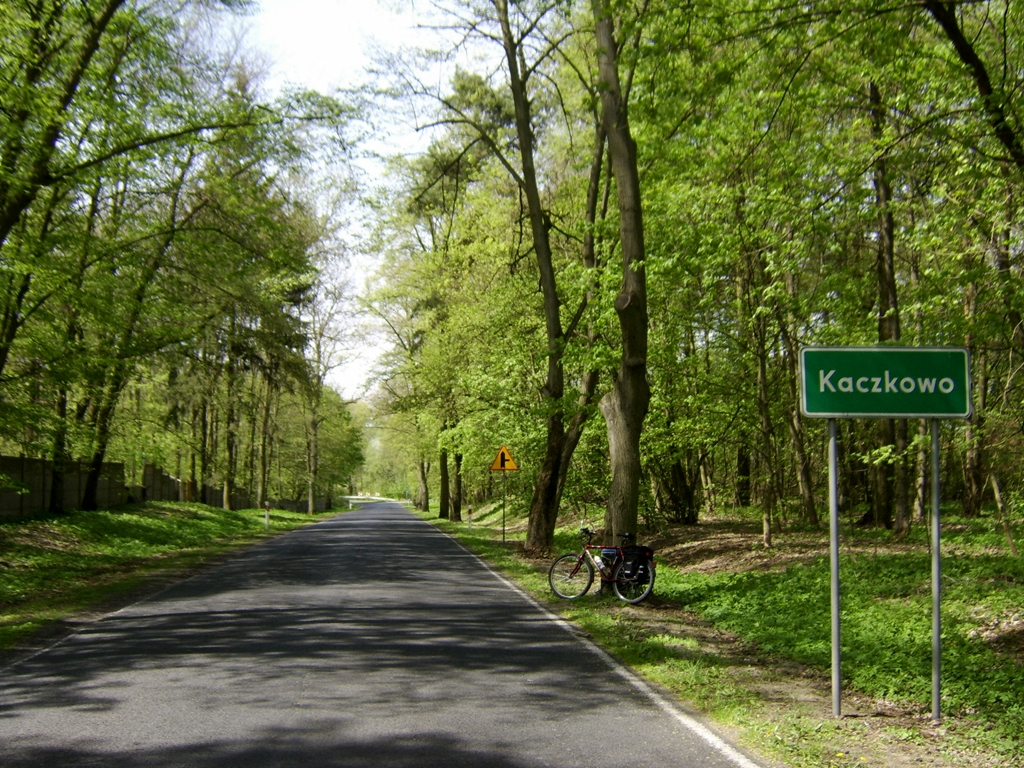
- Road sign in Kaczkowo

- Location within Poland
- Coordinates: 52°53′44″N 18°20′49″E
- Country: Poland
- Voivodeship: Kuyavian-Pomeranian
- County: Inowrocław
- Gmina: Gniewkowo

Kaczkowo [kat͡ʂˈkɔvɔ] is a village in the administrative district of Gmina Gniewkowo, within Inowrocław County, Kuyavian-Pomeranian Voivodeship, in north-central Poland.

== History ==
Stanisław Tuczyński sold Kaczkowo, Skalmierowice, Mierogonowice, Jędrzejewo, Glinno, and Olęndry to Tomasz Przetocki in 1663. In 1670, Przetocki sold the manor of Kaczkowo to Bishop Stanisław Dąmbski (ca. 1638–1700). Dąmbski built a summer palace there. At his death, the manor included the villages of Kaczkowo, Glinno, Skalmirowice, Mierogonowice, Topola, Płonkowo, Dobiesławice, and Zapola.

The bishop's brother, Zygmunt Dąmbski, Count of Lubraniec, inherited the manor of Kaczkowo. The manor then passed to Zygmunt's son, Wojciech Dąmbski, in 1706, and on to Wojciech's son, Antoni Dąmbski, in 1725. Antoni sold the manor to his brother-in-law (and third cousin) Kazimierz Dąmbski, in 1741. Kazimierz's son, Jan Chrziciel Dąmbski, Count of Lubraniec, inherited the manor in 1765. He was living at Kaczkowo in 1812, when foreign troops from Wuerttemberg destroyed the palace.

In 1831, Jan Chrziciel's elder son, Apolinary Dąmbski, inherited Kaczkowo, while his younger son, Kazimierz (whose right to the title "Count Dombski" was recognized by the Prussian government in 1821) inherited Płonkowo. He died in 1833, leaving two daughters and a son, Stanislaw Kostka, who had no issue.

The village of Kaczkowo was served by the Roman Catholic parish of Płonkowo.

In 1882, Kaczkowo had 19 houses, and 141 inhabitants, all Lutherans. Nine inhabitants were illiterate. The nearest post office, telegraph office and railway station were at Gniewkowo, four kilometers away.
