= Osieczek =

Osieczek may refer to the following places:

- Osieczek, Inowrocław County in Kuyavian-Pomeranian Voivodeship (north-central Poland)
- Osieczek, Wąbrzeźno County in Kuyavian-Pomeranian Voivodeship (north-central Poland)
- Osieczek, Masovian Voivodeship (east-central Poland)
- Osieczek, Lubusz Voivodeship (west Poland)
