= Zawiszyn =

Zawiszyn may refer to the following places:

- Zawiszyn, Kuyavian-Pomeranian Voivodeship (north-central Poland)
- Zawiszyn, Masovian Voivodeship (east-central Poland)
- Zawiszyn, Warmian-Masurian Voivodeship (north Poland)
