= Jurańcice =

- Village
- Location within Poland
- Coordinates: 52°55′45″N 18°19′56″E
- Country: Poland
- Voivodeship: Kuyavian-Pomeranian
- County: Inowrocław
- Gmina: Rojewo

Jurańcice [juraɲˈt͡ɕit͡sɛ] is a village in the administrative district of Gmina Rojewo, within Inowrocław County, Kuyavian-Pomeranian Voivodeship, in north-central Poland.
