= Leśnianki =

- Village
- Location within Poland
- Coordinates: 52°54′18″N 18°19′16″E
- Country: Poland
- Voivodeship: Kuyavian-Pomeranian
- County: Inowrocław
- Gmina: Rojewo
- Population: 63

Leśnianki [lɛɕˈɲanki] is a village in the administrative district of Gmina Rojewo, within Inowrocław County, Kuyavian-Pomeranian Voivodeship, in north-central Poland.
