= Żelechlin, Kuyavian-Pomeranian Voivodeship =

Żelechlin
- Village
- Location within Poland
- Coordinates: 52°54′20″N 18°14′42″E
- Country: Poland
- Voivodeship: Kuyavian-Pomeranian
- County: Inowrocław
- Gmina: Rojewo

Żelechlin [ʐɛˈlɛxlin] is a village in the administrative district of Gmina Rojewo, within Inowrocław County, Kuyavian-Pomeranian Voivodeship, in north-central Poland.
