= Stara Wieś, Inowrocław County =

Stara Wieś
- Village
- Location within Poland
- Coordinates: 52°56′42″N 18°17′6″E
- Country: Poland
- Voivodeship: Kuyavian-Pomeranian
- County: Inowrocław
- Gmina: Rojewo

Stara Wieś [ˈstara ˈvjɛɕ] is a village in the administrative district of Gmina Rojewo, within Inowrocław County, Kuyavian-Pomeranian Voivodeship, in north-central Poland.
