= Kreis Strelno =

Location of Kreis Strelno

Kreis Strelno was a district in Regierungsbezirk Bromberg in the Prussian Province of Posen, from 1886 to 1919.

== History ==
On July 1, 1886, the new Strelno district was formed from the southern part of the Inowrazlaw district with the towns of Strelno and Kruschwitz. The town of Strelno became the seat of the district administration.

On December 27, 1918, the Greater Poland uprising began in the province of Posen, and by January 5, 1919, the town of Strelno was under Polish control. On February 16, 1919, an armistice ended the Polish-German fighting, and on June 28, 1919, the German government officially ceded the Strelno district to the newly founded Poland with the signing of the Treaty of Versailles.

== Demographics ==
According to the Prussian census of 1910, the district had a population of 37,620, of which 80% were Poles and 20% were Germans. Most German residents left the area after 1919.

== Military command ==
Kreis Strelno was part of the military command in Posen (German: Bezirkskommando) at Hohensalza.

== Court system ==
The main court (German: Landgericht) was in Bromberg, with lower courts (German: Amtsgericht) in Strelno and Hohensalza.

== Standesämter ==
"Standesamt" is the German name of the local civil registration offices which were established in October 1874 soon after the German Empire was formed. Births, marriages and deaths were recorded. Previously, only the church records were used for Christians. In 1905, these Standesämter served towns in Kreis Strelno:
