= Stanisław Dąmbski =

Polish prelate and king-maker

- Bishop of Krakow
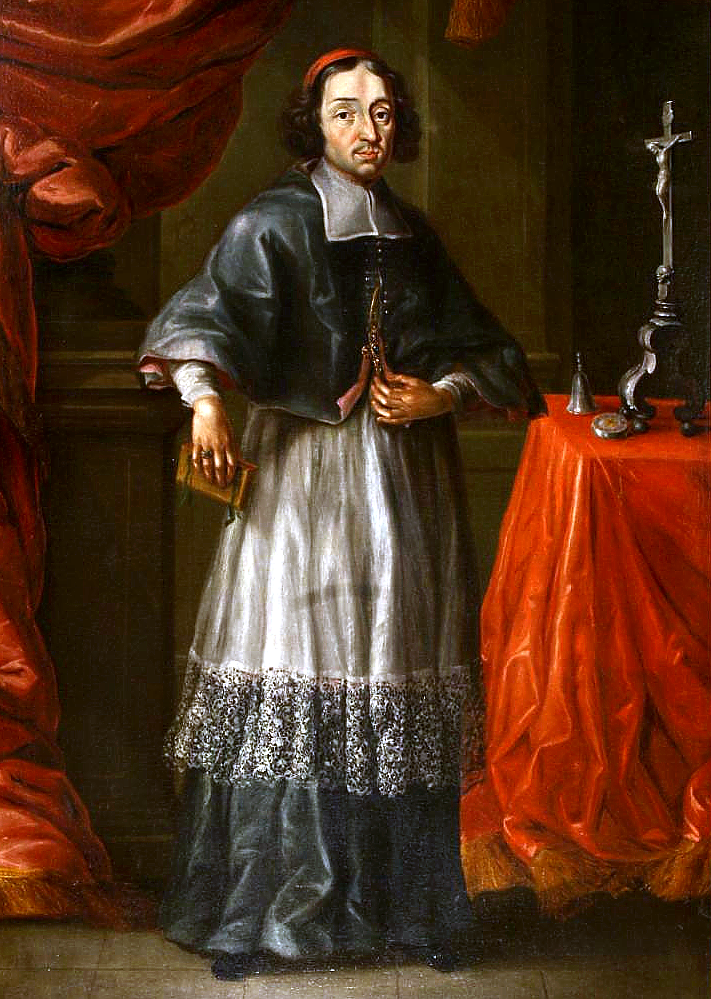
- Native name: Stanisław Kazimierz Dąmbski
- Church: Roman Catholic
- In office: 1673-1700
- Previous posts: Bishop of Chełm, Łuck, Płock, Kujawy

Orders
- Ordination: circa 1665
- Consecration: 1673

Personal details
- Born: Stanisław Kazimierz Dąmbski vel Dąbski probably 1638 Poland
- Died: 15 December 1700 Kraków
- Buried: Saints Peter and Paul Church, Kraków
- Denomination: Roman Catholic
- Parents: Adam Dąmbski and Elżbieta Jemielska
- Education: Jagiellonian University, Kraków

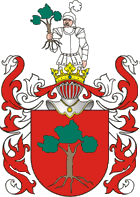
Godziemba family crest

Stanisław Kazimierz Dąmbski (or Dąbski; ca. 1638 – 15 December 1700) was a politically powerful Polish prelate and king-maker. He was in turn, bishop of Chełm, Łuck, Płock, Kujawy and finally, bishop of Krakow.

== Life ==
Dąmbski was the second son of Adam Dąmbski, hrabia (count) of Lubańiec, castellan of Słońsk (died 1660), and Elżbieta Jemielska of Jemielna. The Dąmbskis, an ancient noble family from Inowrocław and Brześć Kujawski, used the Godziemba coat of arms.

After graduating from Kraków Academy, Dąmbski served as secretary to King Michał Korybut Wiśniowiecki. In 1673 Dąmbski became bishop of Chełm, and in 1676 was appointed bishop of Łuck. By 1682 he was bishop of Płock, and in 1692 became bishop of Kujawy.

These episcopal positions provided Dąmbski with immense wealth. He donated to Wawel Cathedral a monstrance studded with precious stones, which remains in the cathedral treasury. He spared no expense sumptuously renovating a number of churches. He founded the Jesuit school in Toruń, constructed the cathedral in Łuck and in 1693 built the Dąmbski Palace in Toruń, which features a fine Baroque facade. He also bought the manor of Kaczkowo (including eight villages) in Inowrocław county in 1670, where he built a summer palace. Between 1679 and 1681, he acquired lands near Iłów comprising a town and 10 villages in the counties of Gostynin and Sochaczew.

== Political life ==
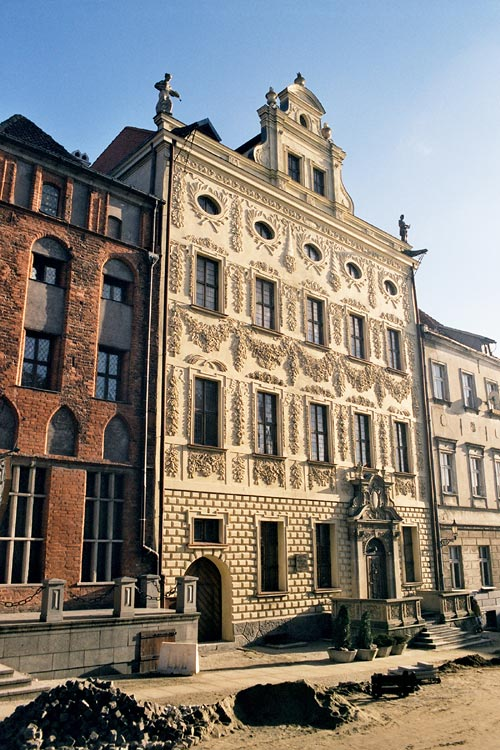
Dąmbski Palace in Toruń.

Dąmbski participated actively in Poland's political life. In the 1674 royal elections, Dąmbski was leader of the anti-French faction, throwing his support behind hetman Jan Sobieski, who ascended the throne as Jan III (died in 1696).

Dąmbski played a key role in the subsequent royal election, which has been described as "one of the most dismal episodes in Polish parliamentary history." Initially Dąmbski backed the late king's son, Jakub Sobieski, however, Sobieski was in Silesia at the time of his father's death, and was immediately seized by Saxon troops. Dąmbski then joined supporters of the Russian-backed candidate, Friedrich August, Elector of Saxony. Despite enormous bribes paid by the Elector and his backers, the Elector's Protestantism aroused suspicions among the Polish nobility. Although the Elector promised to convert to Roman Catholicism, on 27 June 1697, the Polish nobility elected the French candidate, the Prince de Conti, and the Primate proclaimed Conti king.

Nevertheless, that same evening a group of dissenters, led by Dąmbski held a second vote, in the absence of the Primate, who had not returned to the election field. Dąmbski therefore proclaimed the Elector King of Poland. The Elector arrived in short order and on September 15, Dąmbski crowned the Elector king August II of Poland in Wawel Cathedral. It was the first time that a deceased monarch's son had not been elected to succeed him, that the rightful candidate had been disbarred from the throne by military force, and that the Poles had acquired a German king, which went against a long tradition of keeping German hegemony at arm's length." A grateful King August II nominated Dąmbski bishop of Krakow on 30 March 1700. However, before he could be installed, Dąmbski died suddenly. He was buried in the Saints Peter and Paul Church, Kraków.

== Table of contents ==
Preceded by Krzysztof Jan Żegocki	Bishop of Chełm; 1673-1676	Succeeded by Stanisław Jacek Święcicki
Preceded by Tomasz Leżeński	Bishop of Łuck; 1676-1682	Succeeded by Stanisław Witwicki
Preceded by Bonawentura Madaliński	Bishop of Płock; 1682-1691	Succeeded by Andrzej Chryzostom Załuski
Preceded by Bonawentura Madaliński	Bishop of Kujawy; 1682-1691	Succeeded by Stanisław Szembek
Preceded by Jan Małachowski	Bishop of Krakow Duke of Siewierz; 1700	Succeeded by Jerzy Albrecht Doenhoff
