= Gmina Rojewo =

Gmina Rojewo Rojewo Commune
- Gmina
- Coat of arms
- Interactive map of Gmina Rojewo
- Coordinates (Rojewo): 52°54′10″N 18°16′14″E
- Country: Poland
- Voivodeship: Kuyavian-Pomeranian
- County: Inowrocław
- Seat: Rojewo

Area
  - Total: 120.21 km^{2} (46.41 sq mi)

Population (2006)
  - Total: 4,603
  - Density: 38.29/km^{2} (99.17/sq mi)
- Website: http://www.rojewo.pl

Gmina Rojewo is a rural gmina (administrative district) in Inowrocław County, Kuyavian-Pomeranian Voivodeship, in north-central Poland. Its seat is the village of Rojewo, which lies approximately 13 kilometres (8 mi) north of Inowrocław, 28 km (17 mi) south-west of Toruń, and 30 km (19 mi) south-east of Bydgoszcz.

The gmina covers an area of 120.21 square kilometres (46.4 sq mi), and as of 2006 its total population is 4,603.

== Villages ==
Gmina Rojewo contains the villages and settlements of Bród Kamienny, Budziaki, Dąbie, Dąbrowa Mała, Dobiesławice, Glinki, Glinno Wielkie, Jarki, Jaszczołtowo, Jezuicka Struga, Jurańcice, Leśnianki, Liszkowice, Liszkowo, Łukaszewo, Magdaleniec, Mierogonowice, Osieczek, Osiek Wielki, Płonkówko, Płonkowo, Rojewice, Rojewo, Ściborze, Stara Wieś, Topola, Wybranowo, Zawiszyn and Żelechlin.

== Neighbouring gminas ==
Gmina Rojewo is bordered by the gminas of Gniewkowo, Inowrocław, Nowa Wieś Wielka, Solec Kujawski, Wielka Nieszawka and Złotniki Kujawskie.
