= Budziaki, Kuyavian-Pomeranian Voivodeship =

Budziaki
- Village
- Location within Poland
- Coordinates: 52°54′29″N 18°13′33″E
- Country: Poland
- Voivodeship: Kuyavian-Pomeranian
- County: Inowrocław
- Gmina: Rojewo
- Population: 90

Budziaki [buˈd͡ʑaki] is a village in the administrative district of Gmina Rojewo, within Inowrocław County, Kuyavian-Pomeranian Voivodeship, in north-central Poland.
