= Topola, Kuyavian-Pomeranian Voivodeship =

Topola
- Village
- Location within Poland
- Coordinates: 52°53′01″N 18°16′21″E
- Country: Poland
- Voivodeship: Kuyavian-Pomeranian
- County: Inowrocław
- Gmina: Rojewo

Topola [tɔˈpɔla] is a village in the administrative district of Gmina Rojewo, within Inowrocław County, Kuyavian-Pomeranian Voivodeship, in north-central Poland.
