= Rojewice =

- Village
- Location within Poland
- Coordinates: 52°58′N 18°18′E
- Country: Poland
- Voivodeship: Kuyavian-Pomeranian
- County: Inowrocław
- Gmina: Rojewo

Rojewice [rɔjɛˈvit͡sɛ] is a village in the administrative district of Gmina Rojewo, within Inowrocław County, Kuyavian-Pomeranian Voivodeship, in north-central Poland.
