= Strzelno =

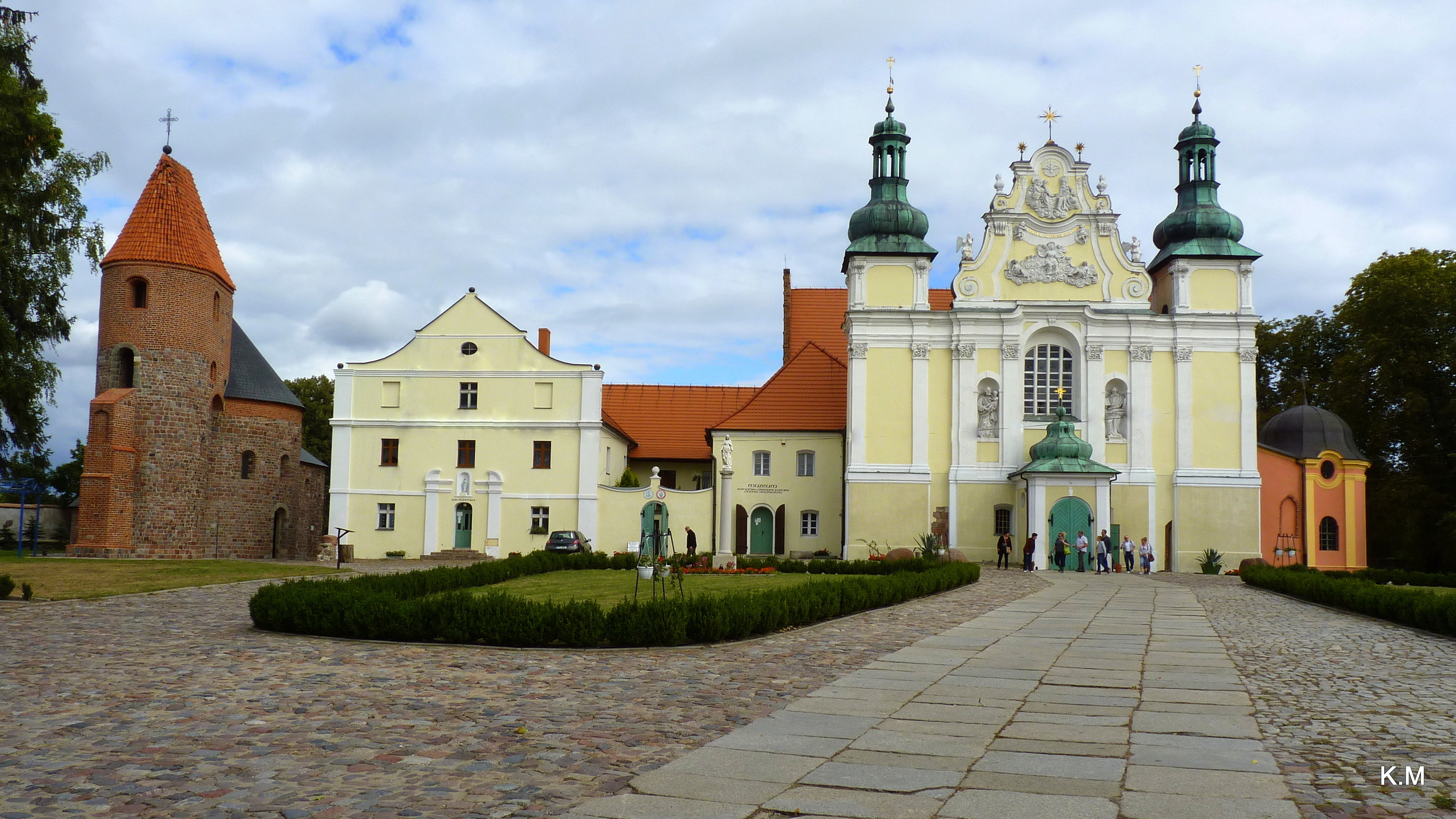
- Norbertine monastery complex with the Holy Trinity Church (right) and Saint Procopius Church (left)

- Coat of arms

- Location within Poland
- Coordinates: 52°37′46″N 18°10′12″E
- Country: Poland
- Voivodeship: Kuyavian-Pomeranian
- County: Mogilno
- Gmina: Strzelno

Area
  - Total: 4.46 km^{2} (1.72 sq mi)

Population (2006)
  - Total: 5,145.
  - Density: 1,150/km^{2} (2,990/sq mi)
- Time zone: UTC+1 (CET)
  - Summer (DST): UTC+2 (CEST)
- Postal code: 88-320
- Vehicle registration: CMG
- Website: http://www.strzelno.pl

Strzelno [ˈstʂɛlnɔ] is a town in the Kuyavian-Pomeranian Voivodeship, Poland. The town is located 18 km (11.18 mi) south of Inowrocław. According to the June 2005 Census, the population numbered 5,145. It is located in the historic region of Kuyavia.

== History ==
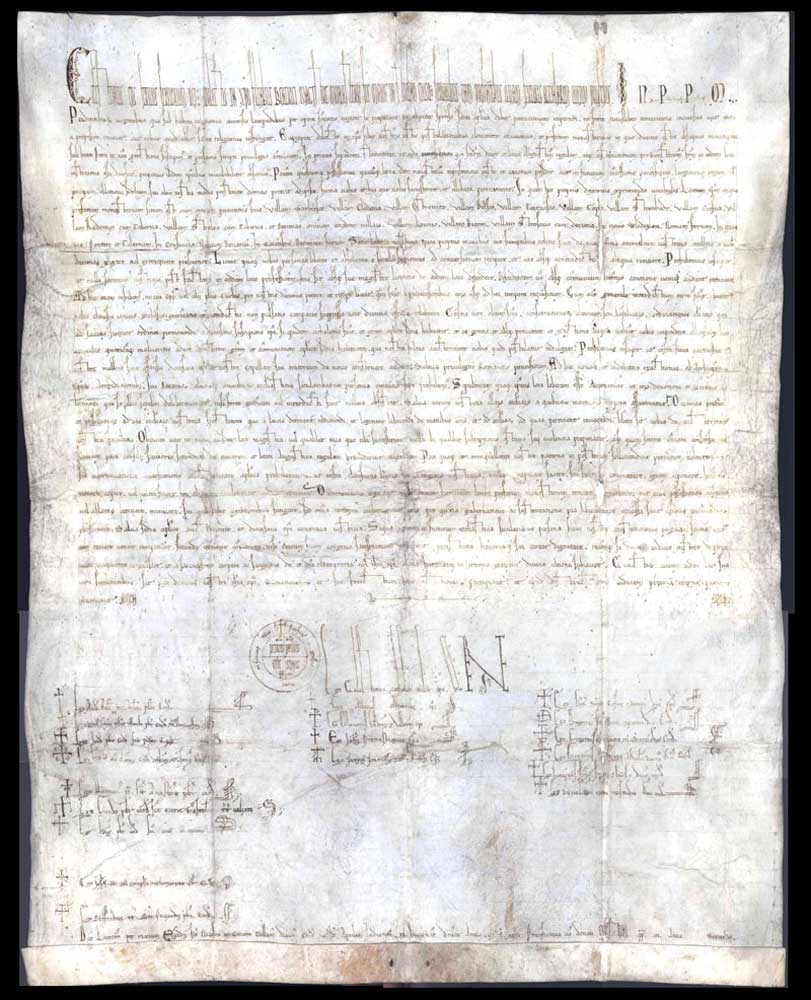
Privilege of Pope Celestine III for the monastery in Strzelno issued in Rome in 1193.

Establishment of the town is connected to Piotr Włostowic, a 12th-century Polish noble and voivode of Polish monarch Bolesław III Wrymouth. He is considered the founder of the Church of St. Cross. In the 1180s, in what was then the village Strzelno, a Norbertine nuns convent was founded. The monastery church originally bore the name church of St. Trinity, in later years the name was extended to St. Trinity and the Blessed Virgin Mary. Strzelno received town rights in 1231. It was a private church town, administratively located in the Kruszwica County in the Brześć Kujawski Voivodeship in the Greater Poland Province. The Crown Field Buława Horse Regiment of the Polish Crown Army was stationed in Strzelno in 1775. In local baptism records from 1792, the town is spelled as Strzellno.

With the Second Partition of Poland, Strzelno, under the Germanized name Strelno, was annexed by Prussia in 1793. In 1807, it was regained by Poles and included within the short-lived Polish Duchy of Warsaw. After the duchy's dissolution, in 1815, the town was re-annexed by Prussia. In 1837, the monastery was closed. In 1871, it became part of Germany. From 1886, Strelno experienced an economic boom as a district capital, and was connected to the Prussian State Railway in 1892. According to the census of 1890, the town had a population of 4,176, of which 2,600 (62.3%) were Poles. 432 Jews lived in Strzelno in 1885, and 141 in 1910. Until 1919, Strelno was the capital of the Strelno district in the administrative region of Bromberg in the Prussian Province of Posen in the German Reich.

After World War I, in 1918, Poland regained independence and the Greater Poland uprising broke out, which aim was to reintegrate the region with Poland. Polish insurgents captured the town on January 2, 1919, and it became again part of Poland. During the German occupation of Poland during World War II, the Polish population was subjected to mass arrests, deportations, murder and expulsions. Many Poles, including activists and teachers, were either murdered or deported to concentration camps during the Intelligenzaktion. In 1939, the families of the victims, as well as owners of larger houses, shops, workshops and barbershops were expelled to the General Government, and their property was handed over to Germans as part of the Lebensraum policy. In 1940, the Gestapo carried out massacres of around 200 Poles in the nearby Kurzebiela forest. The occupiers operated a Nazi prison in the town. In 1945, Strzelno was restored to Poland.

== Landmarks ==
The Norbertine monastery complex with the Romanesque Saint Procopius Church and the Romanesque-Gothic-Baroque Holy Trinity Church is listed as a Historic Monument of Poland. The 12th-century church of Saint Procopius, in the shape of a Romanesque rotunda, is considered to be one of the best preserved original churches in Poland. There is a museum in the monastery.

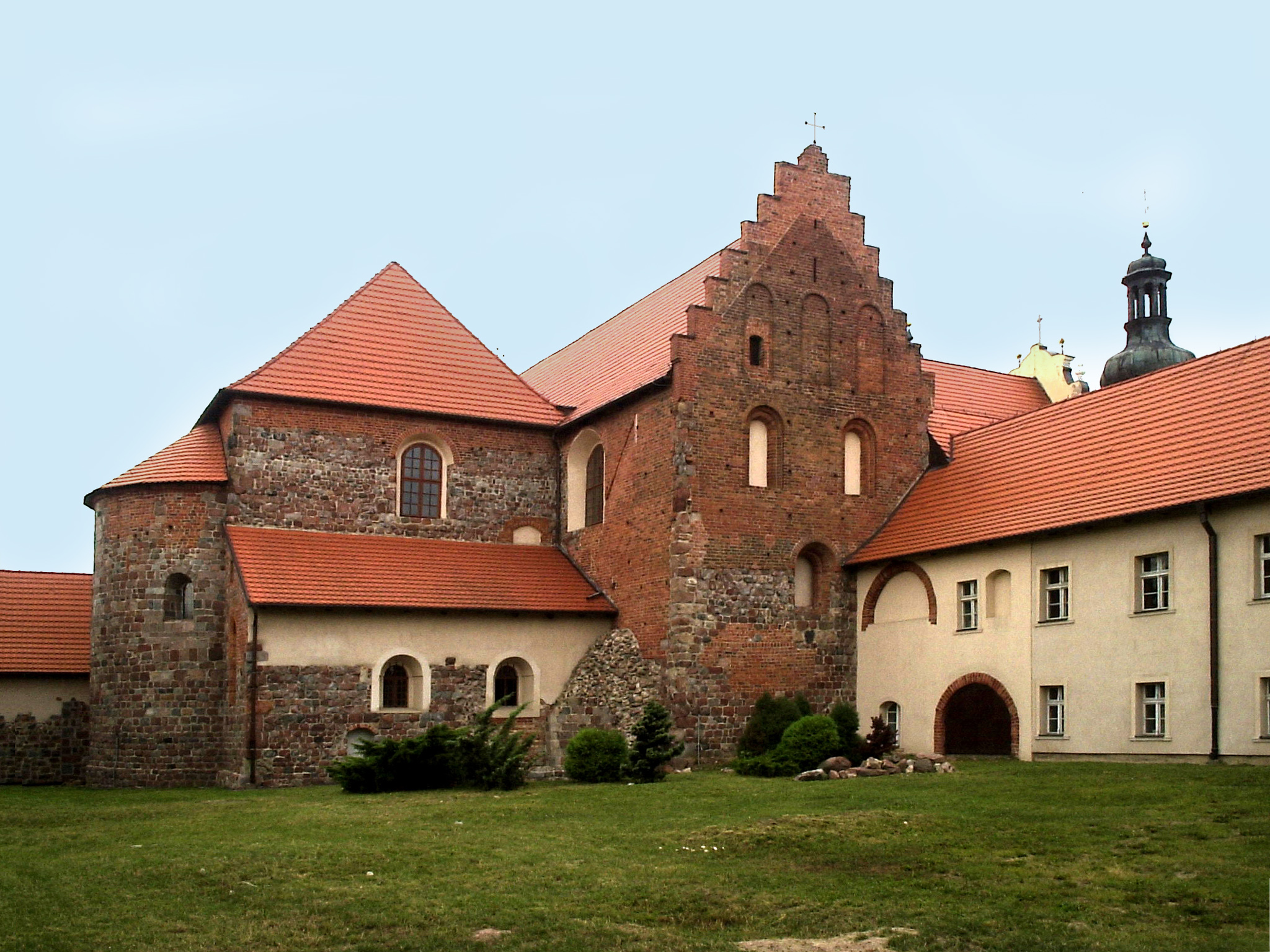
Monastery (back view)

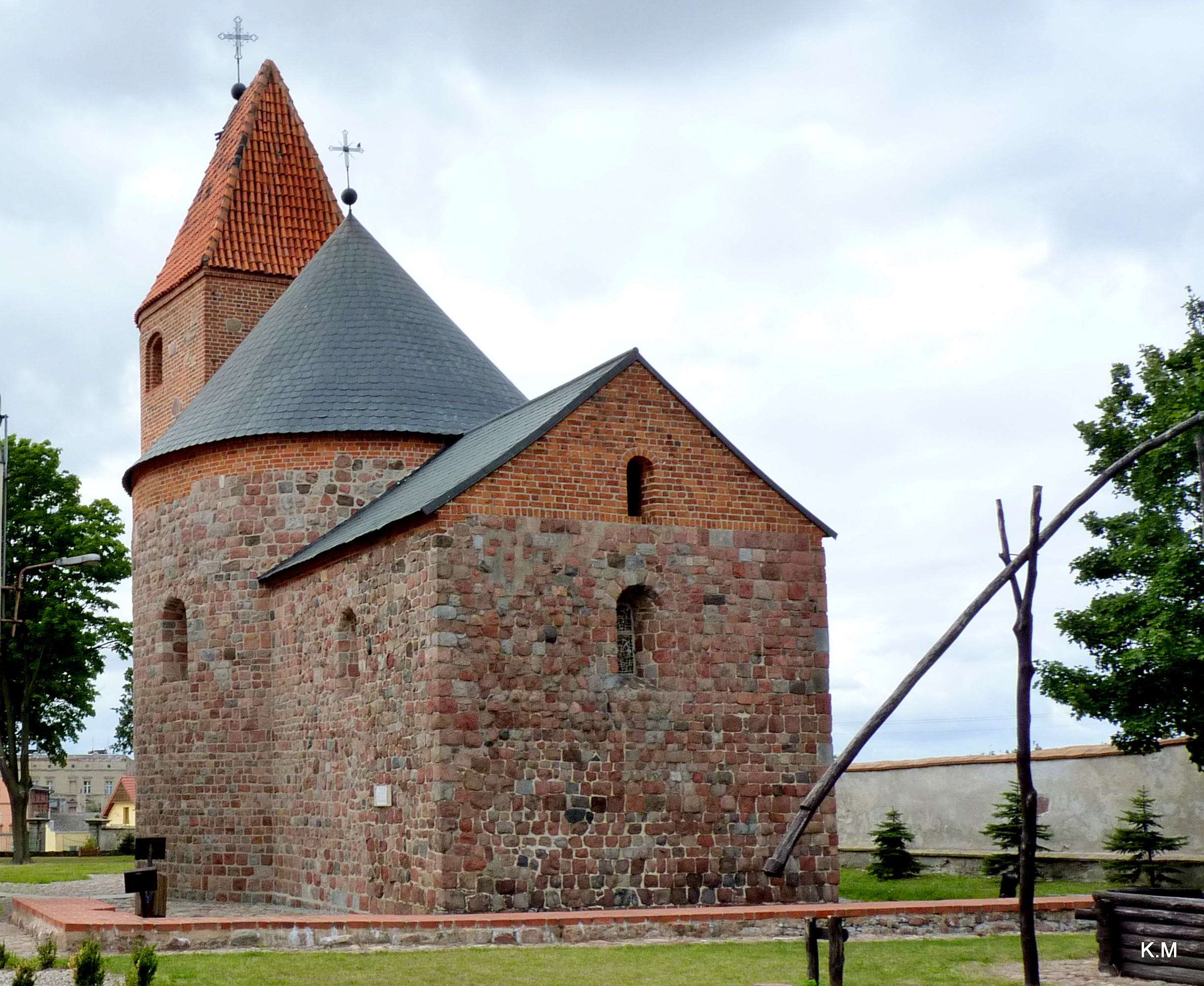
Romanesque Saint Procopius Church

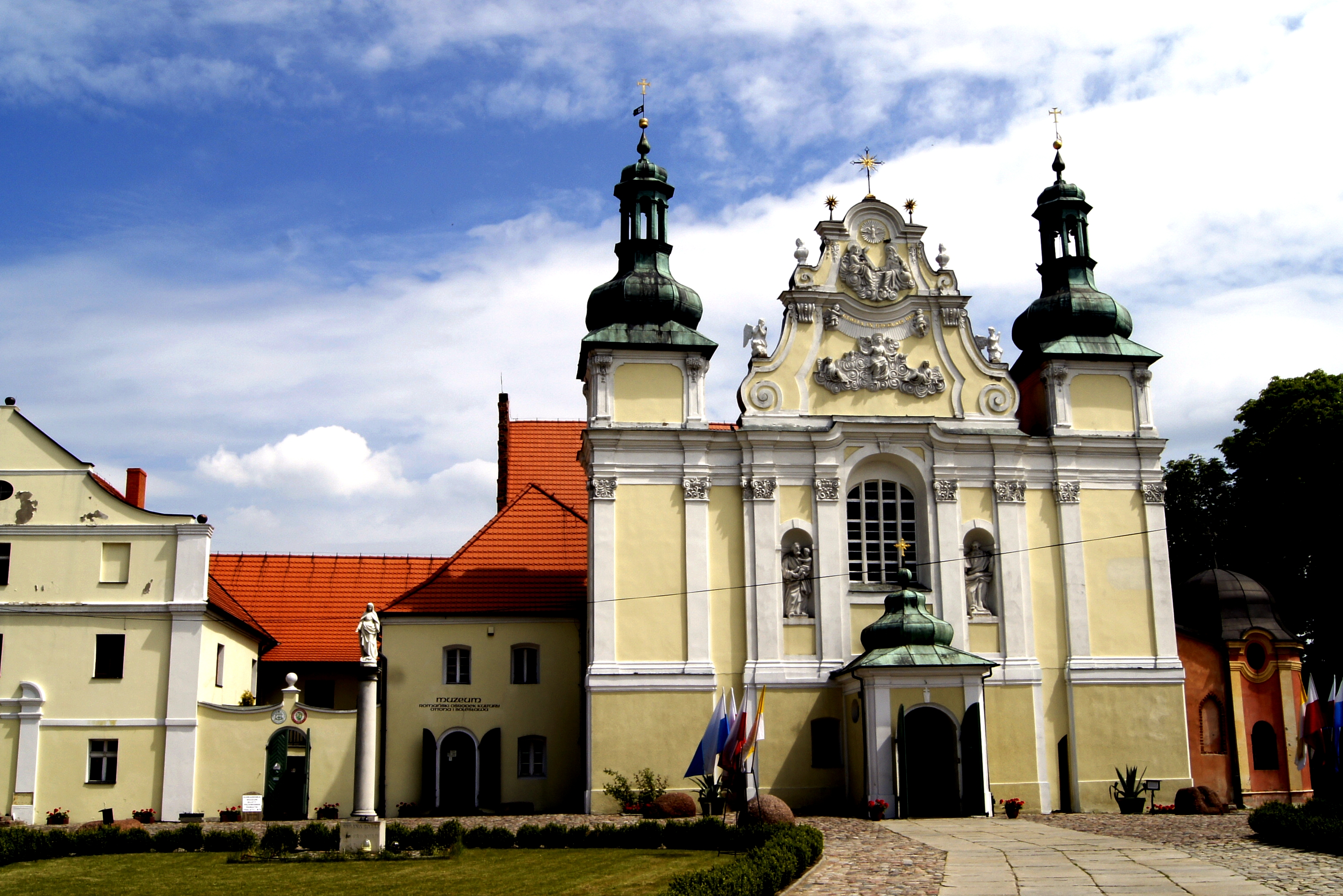
Baroque facade of the Holy Trinity Church

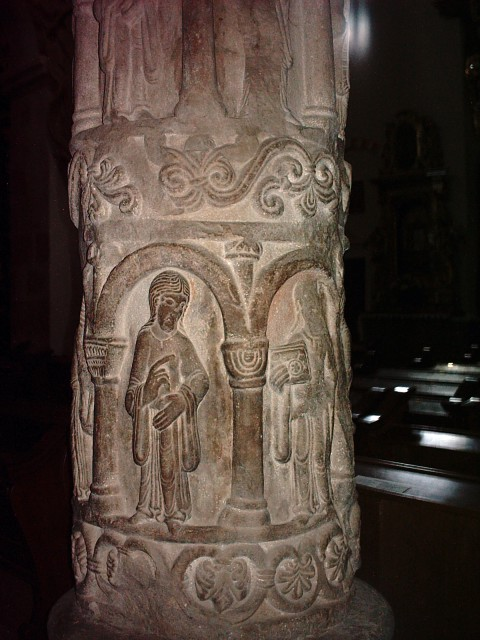
One of the Romanesque columns of virtues in the Holy Trinity Church

== Transport ==
Strzelno stands at the junction of national roads 62, 25 and 15.

Voivodeship road 255 also comes into Strzelno.

The nearest railway station is in Inowrocław.

== Sports ==
- football team – Kujawianka Strzelno
- junior handball team – Alfa Strzelno

== Notable people ==
Born in Strzelno:

- Ridley Haim Herschell (1807–1864), British evangelist
- Jakub Cieślewicz (1846–1930), Polish medical doctor, participant of Polish uprisings of 1863–1864 and 1918–1919 and social activist
- Albert Abraham Michelson (1852–1931), Nobel Prize-winning American physicist and scientist
- Carl Minkley (1866–1937), American politician
- Stanisław Gądecki (born 1949), archbishop of Poznań, deputy chairman of Polish Episcopal Conference
- Radosław Hyży (born 1977), Polish retired basketball player and member of the Poland men's national basketball team, and basketball coach
