= Kujawianka Strzelno =

Polish football club

- Full name: Międzyzakładowy Ludowy Klub Sportowy Kujawianka Strzelno
- Founded: 1922
- Ground: Strzelno, Poland
- Capacity: 800
- Chairman: Mateusz Adamczyk
- Manager: Jacek Sobczak
- League: A-klasa Cuiavian-Pomeranian Group 2
- 2009/2010: 3
Home colours	Away colours

Międzyzakładowy Ludowy Klub Sportowy Kujawianka Strzelno is a football club from Strzelno, Poland. It was found in 1922.They're currently playing in A-klasa (VII level)
