= Holy Trinity Church, Strzelno =

Holy Trinity Church
- Kościół Świętej Trójcy
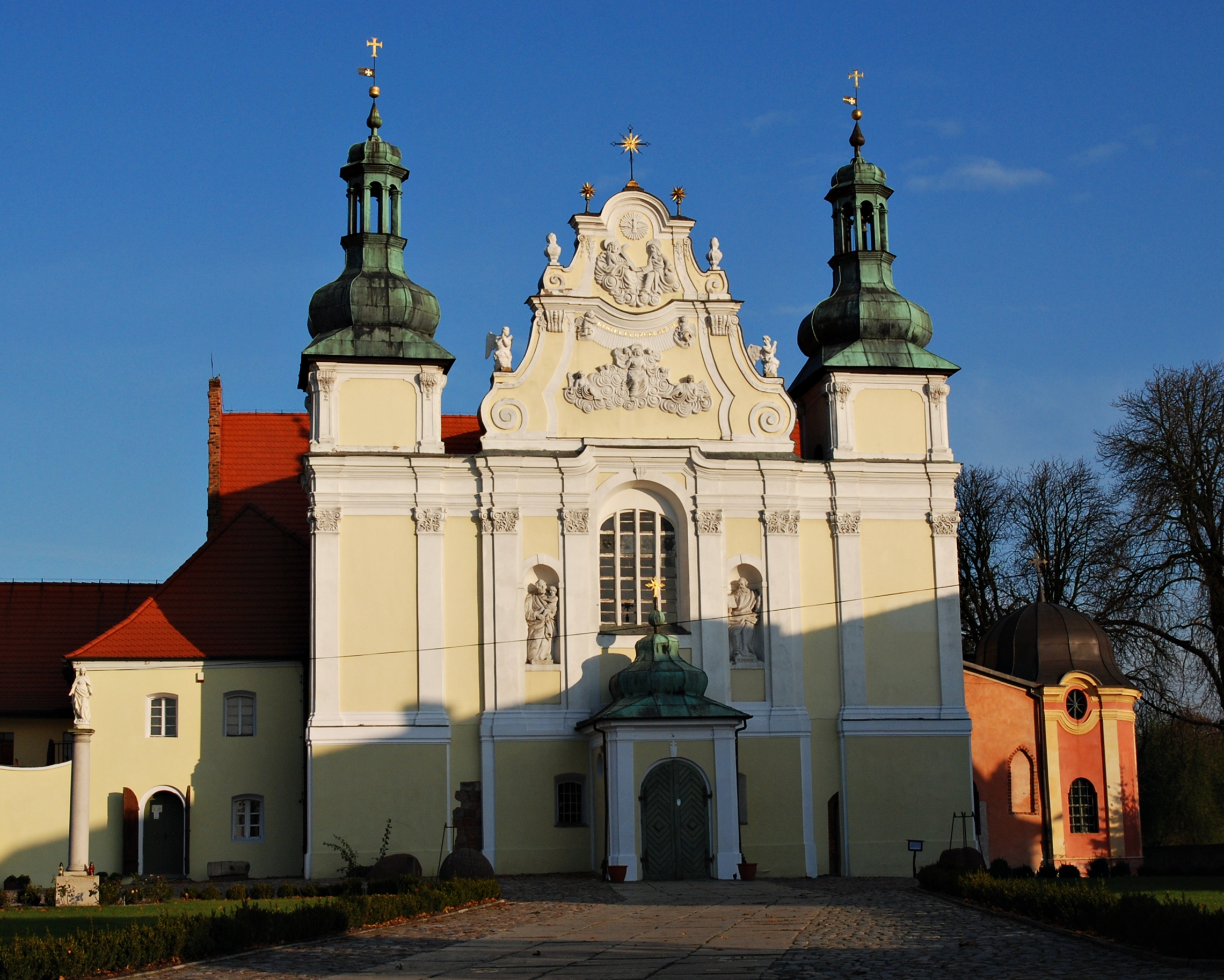
- Baroque façade

- 52.6303°N 18.1792°E
- Location: Strzelno
- Country: Poland
- Denomination: Catholic

History
- Status: Parish church
- Dedication: Holy Trinity
- Consecrated: 1216

Architecture
- Functional status: Active
- Heritage designation: Historic Monument of Poland.
- Style: Romanesque-Baroque

Administration
- Archdiocese: Gniezno
- Deanery: Strzelno

Holy Trinity Church (Polish: Kościół Świętej Trójcy, German: Dreifaltigkeits- und Marienkirche) is a Romanesque-Baroque basilica in Strzelno consecrated in 1216. It forms part of the former Norbertine Abbey complex, which is listed as a Historic Monument of Poland.

== Gallery ==
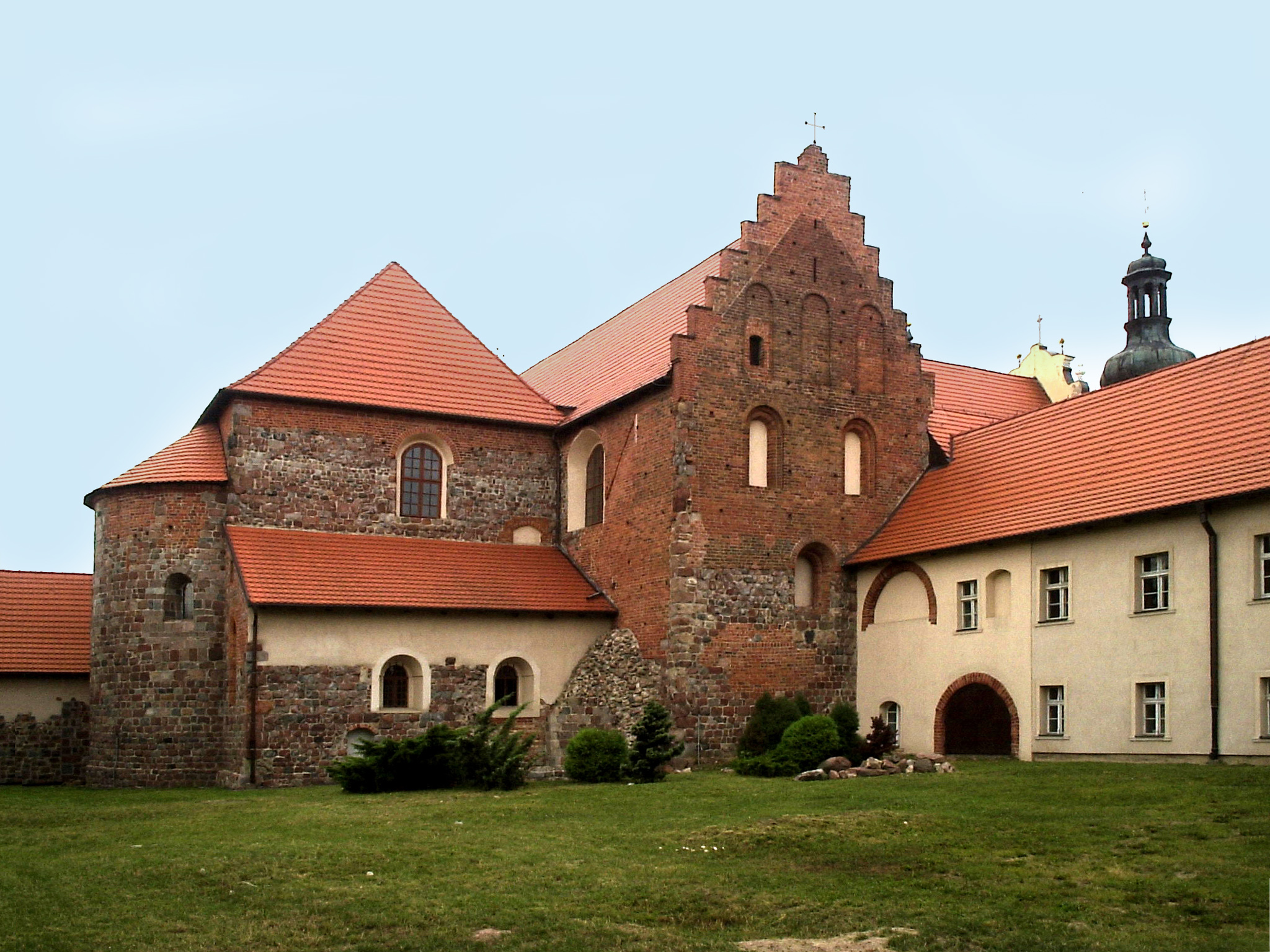
Romanesque part of the church

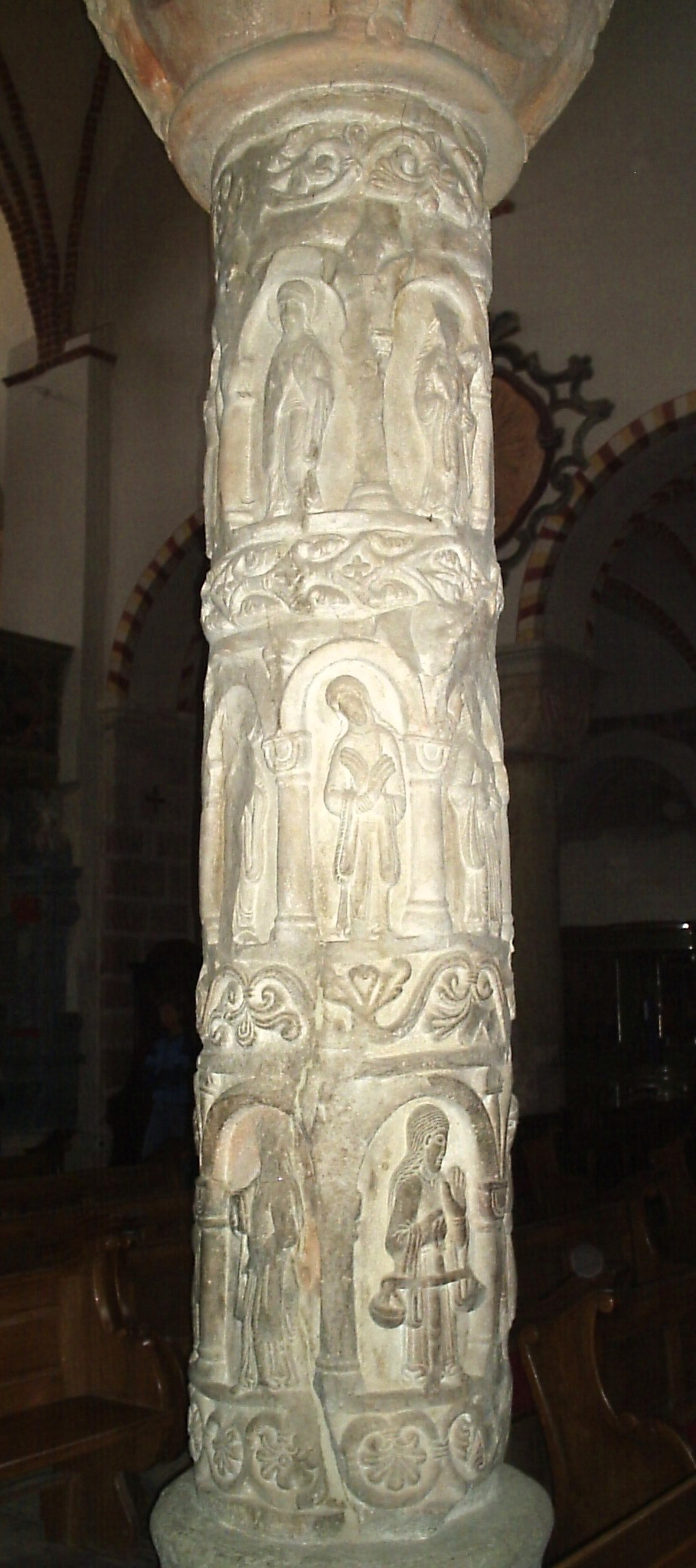
Column of virtues

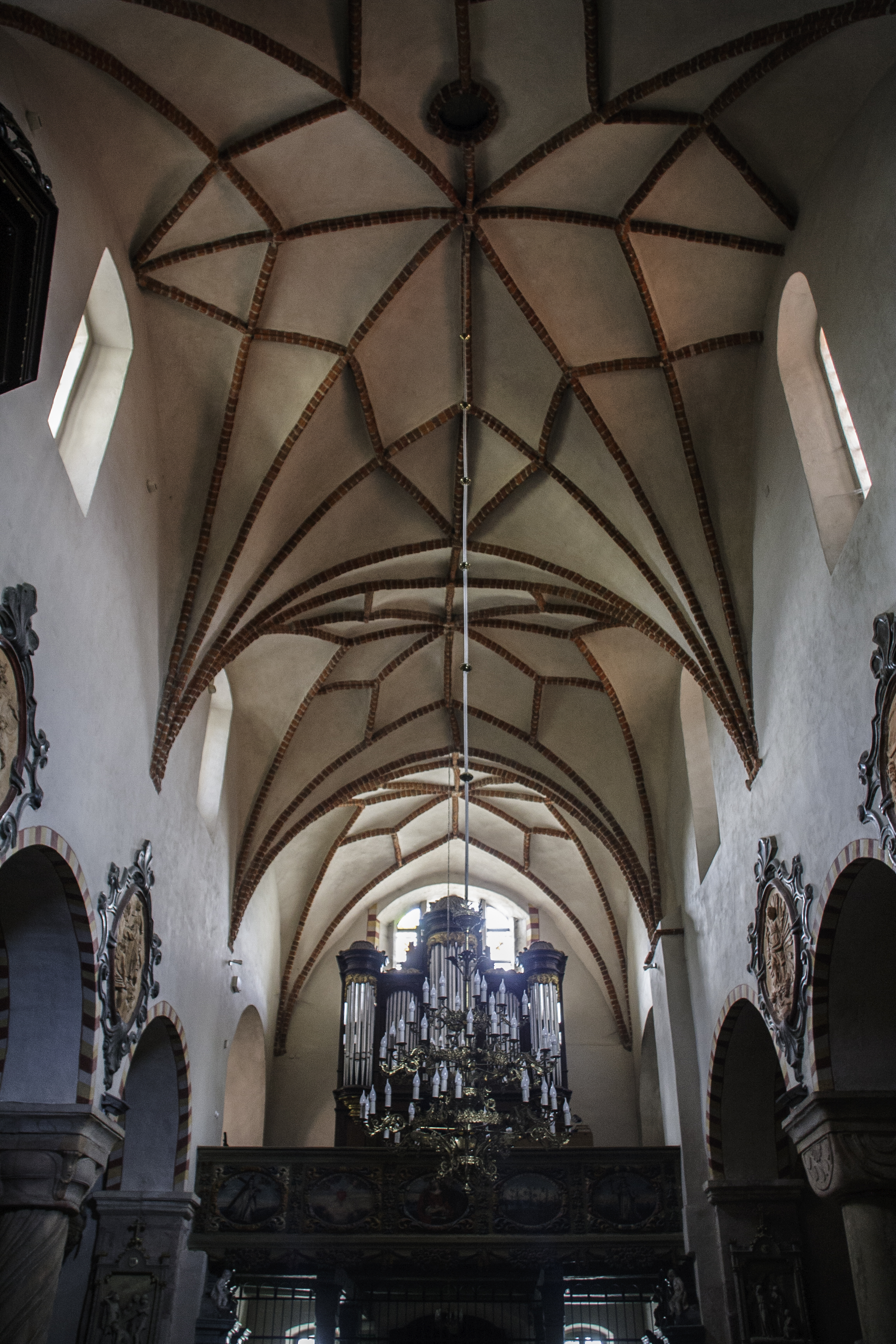
Vault

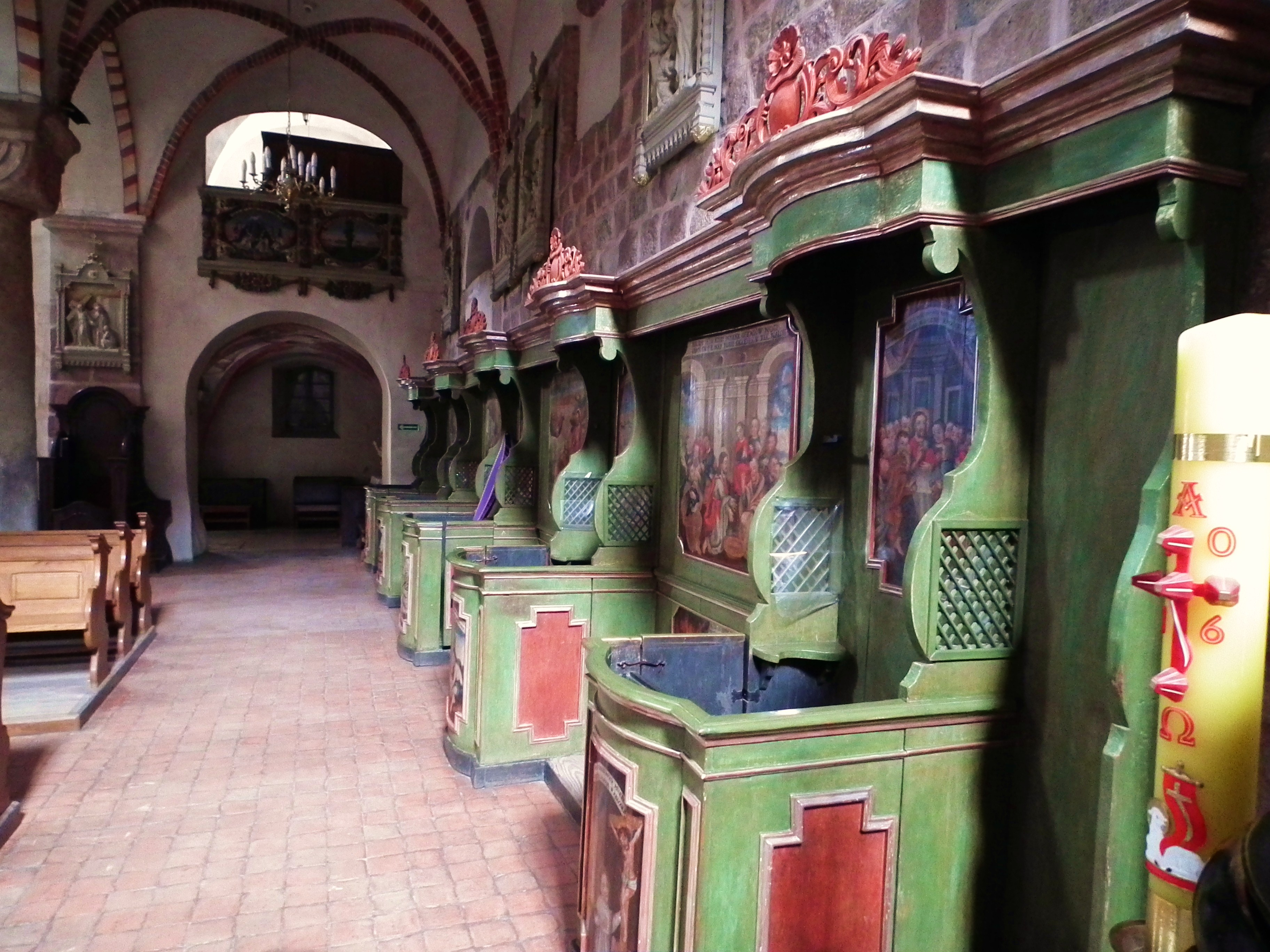
Baroque confessionals
