= Łukaszewo, Inowrocław County =

Łukaszewo
- Village
- Country: Poland
- Voivodeship: Kuyavian-Pomeranian
- County: Inowrocław
- Gmina: Rojewo

Łukaszewo [wukaˈʂɛvɔ] is a village in the administrative district of Gmina Rojewo, within Inowrocław County, Kuyavian-Pomeranian Voivodeship, in north-central Poland.
