= Osiek Wielki, Kuyavian-Pomeranian Voivodeship =

Osiek Wielki
- Village
- Location within Poland
- Coordinates: 52°59′N 18°17′E
- Country: Poland
- Voivodeship: Kuyavian-Pomeranian
- County: Inowrocław
- Gmina: Rojewo
- Time zone: UTC+1 (CET)
  - Summer (DST): UTC+2 (CEST)
- Vehicle registration: CIN

Osiek Wielki (Polish pronunciation: [ˈɔɕɛk ˈfjɛlkʲi]) is a village in the administrative district of Gmina Rojewo, within Inowrocław County, Kuyavian-Pomeranian Voivodeship, in north-central Poland.

Six Polish citizens were murdered by Nazi Germany in the village during World War II.
