= Bonawentura Madaliński =

Bishop of Kuyavia

- Bishop of Kujawy

Personal details
- Died: 1691
- Buried: Włocławek Cathedral
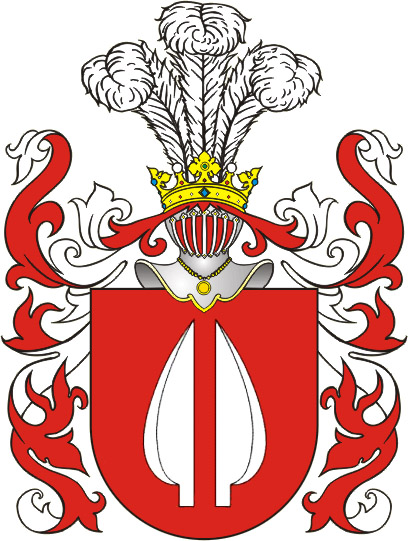
- Coat of arms

Bonawentura Madaliński (d. 1691) was a Polish nobleman and clergyman who was Bishop of Płock and Kujawy.

According to historian Stanisław Karwowski, Madaliński was born to Piotr of Niedzielska, a nobleman who claimed the Larissa coat of arms. According to historian Antoni Julian Nowowiejski, Madaliński, once ordained, initiated his early career with Krzysztof Opaliński, Karol Ferdynand Vasa, and eventually John Casimir. In 1672, he was coadjutor of Płock, then Bishop of Płock in 1675, and finally Bishop of Kujawy in 1680. As Bishop of Kujawy, he carried out canonical visitations throughout the archdeanery of Pomerania in the years 1686–1687.

Madaliński died in 1691 and was buried at the cathedral in Włocławek. According to Karwowski, the cathedral benefited from Madaliński's charity.

== See also ==
- Roman Catholic Diocese of Włocławek
- Roman Catholic Diocese of Płock
