= Ściborze =

- Village
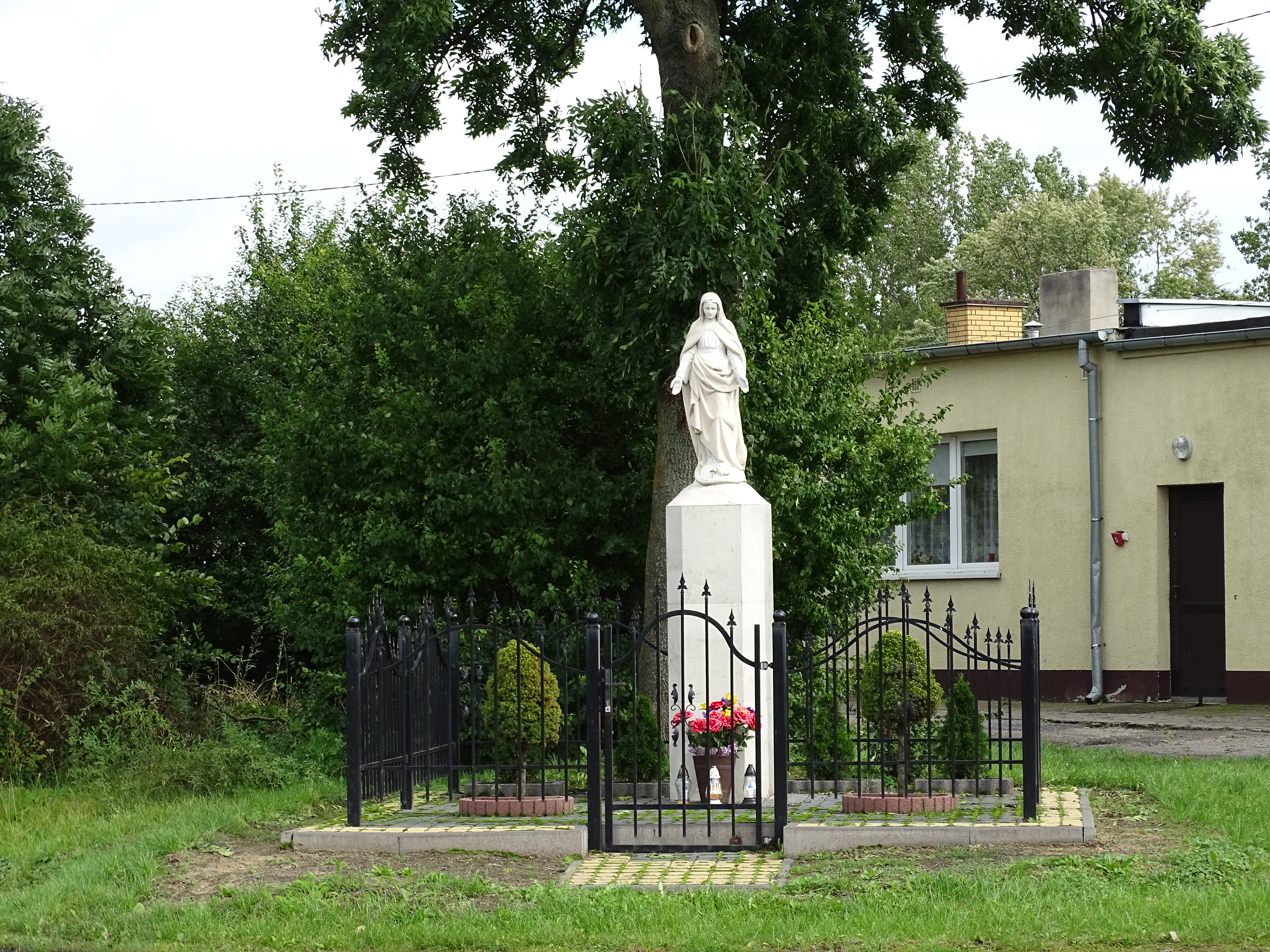
- Virgin Mary Statue

- Location within Poland
- Coordinates: 52°51′43″N 18°16′27″E
- Country: Poland
- Voivodeship: Kuyavian-Pomeranian
- County: Inowrocław
- Gmina: Rojewo

Ściborze [ɕt͡ɕiˈbɔʐɛ] is a village in the administrative district of Gmina Rojewo, within Inowrocław County, Kuyavian-Pomeranian Voivodeship, in north-central Poland.
