= Glinki, Inowrocław County =

Glinki
- Village
- Location within Poland
- Coordinates: 52°57′N 18°20′E
- Country: Poland
- Voivodeship: Kuyavian-Pomeranian
- County: Inowrocław
- Gmina: Rojewo

Glinki [ˈɡlinki] is a village in the administrative district of Gmina Rojewo, within Inowrocław County, Kuyavian-Pomeranian Voivodeship, in north-central Poland.
