= Rojewo, Inowrocław County =

Rojewo
- Village
- Location within Poland
- Coordinates: 52°54′10″N 18°16′14″E
- Country: Poland
- Voivodeship: Kuyavian-Pomeranian
- County: Inowrocław
- Gmina: Rojewo
- Population: 600
- Website: http://www.rojewo.pl

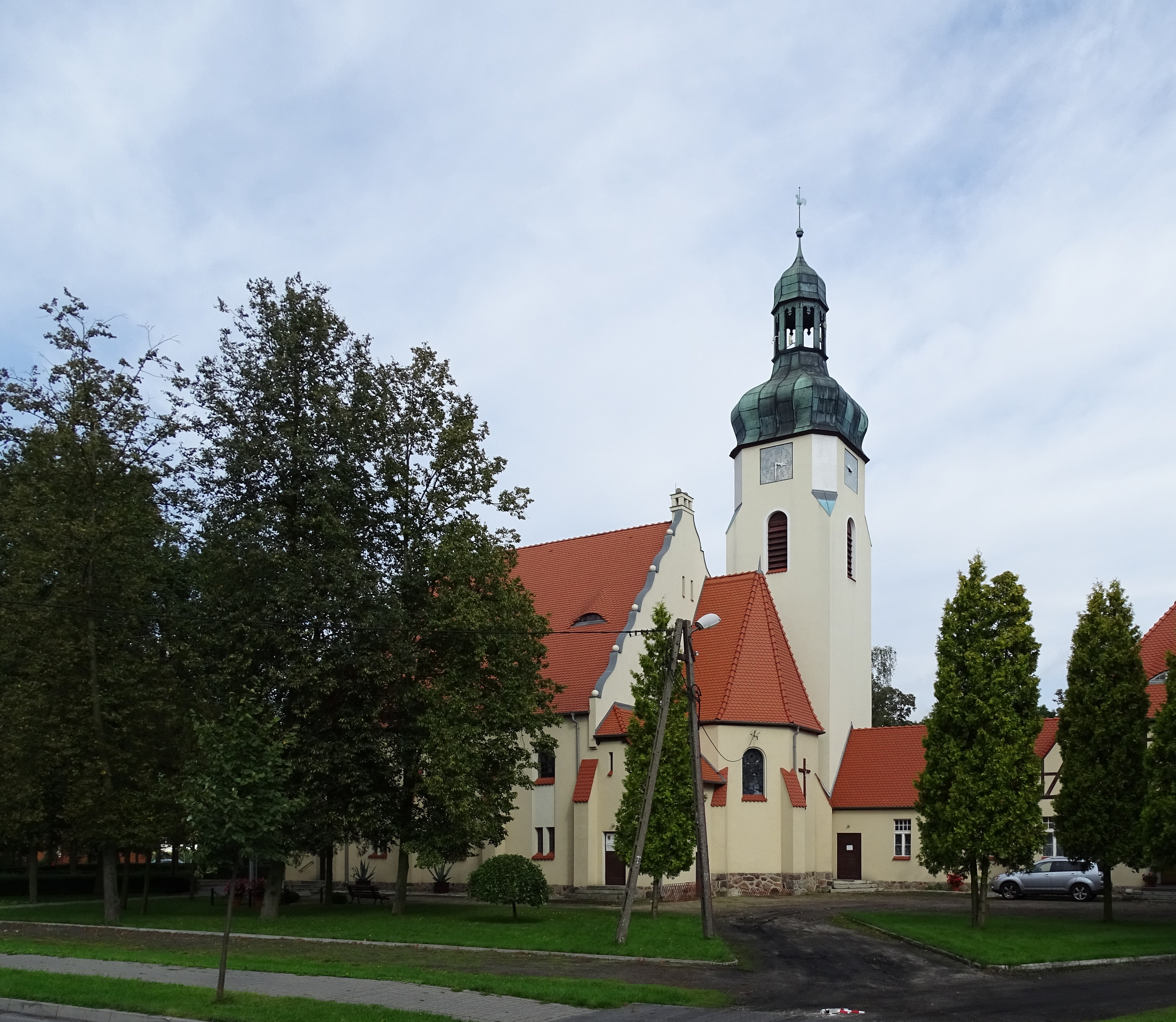
Virgin Mary church.

Rojewo [rɔˈjɛvɔ] (German: Roneck) is a village in Inowrocław County, Kuyavian-Pomeranian Voivodeship, in north-central Poland. It is the seat of the gmina (administrative district) called Gmina Rojewo.
