= Wybranowo, Inowrocław County =

Wybranowo
- Village
- Location within Poland
- Coordinates: 52°52′N 18°15′E
- Country: Poland
- Voivodeship: Kuyavian-Pomeranian
- County: Inowrocław
- Gmina: Rojewo

Wybranowo [vɨbraˈnɔvɔ] (German: Wibrannowo) is a village in the administrative district of Gmina Rojewo, within Inowrocław County, Kuyavian-Pomeranian Voivodeship, in north-central Poland.

Łążyn [ˈwɔ̃ʐɨn] (German: Lonzyn) is a hamlet in Wybranowo.
