= Mierogoniewice =

- Village
- Location within Poland
- Coordinates: 52°52′37″N 18°19′43″E
- Country: Poland
- Voivodeship: Kuyavian-Pomeranian
- County: Inowrocław
- Gmina: Rojewo

Mierogoniewice [mjɛrɔɡɔɲɛˈvit͡sɛ] is a village in the administrative district of Gmina Rojewo, within Inowrocław County, Kuyavian-Pomeranian Voivodeship, in north-central Poland.
