= Kreis Wongrowitz =

District of Prussia

Location of Kreis Wongrowitz

Kreis Wongrowitz (until 1875 Kreis Wongrowiec) was one of several districts in the northern administrative region of Bromberg, in the Prussian province of Posen.

== History ==
The district of Wongrowiec was initially a district in the Prussian province of South Prussia, which became part of Prussia after the Second Partition of Poland in 1793. With the Treaty of Tilsit in 1807, it passed to the Duchy of Warsaw. After the Congress of Vienna in 1815, the district was returned to Prussia and became part of Bromberg Region in the Grand Duchy of Posen and from 1848, the Province of Posen. The district capital was the town of Wongrowiec.

As part of the Province of Posen, the Wongrowiec district became part of the German Empire in 1871. In 1875 the town and the district of Wongrowiec were renamed Wongrowitz. In 1887, a large part of the district, including the town of Janowiec Wielkopolski was ceded to the newly formed Znin district.

On December 27, 1918, the Greater Poland uprising began in the province of Posen, and by December 30, 1918, the district town of Wongrowitz was under Polish control. On February 16, 1919, an armistice ended the Polish-German fighting, and on June 28, 1919, the German government officially ceded the Wongrowitz district to the Second Polish Republic with the signing of the Treaty of Versailles.

== Demographics ==
According to the census of 1858, Kreis Wongrowitz had a population of 51,127, of which 13,230 (25.9%) were Germans and 37,897 (74.1%) were Poles.

== Communities ==
These records come from the 1905 Prussian gazetteer Gemeindelexikon für das Königreich Preußen.

Town	Polish Spelling	Type	1905 Pop	Prot.	Cath.	Jews	Civil Ofc	Police Ofc	Court Ofc	Cath. Ch	Prot. Ch	Notes	More
Alden	Kakulin	Village	272	103	169	0	Proberen	Schokken	Wongrowitz	Ratschkowo	Schokken		
Alt Panigrodz	Panigrodz	Village	429	5	424	0	Czerlin	Gollantsch	Exin	Panigrodz	Gollantsch		
Bartelsee	Bartodzije / Bartodzieje	Village	247	44	203	0	Wongrowitz	Wongrowitz	Wongrowitz	Wongrowitz	Wongrowitz		
Bialybrod	Białybród	Estate	69	7	62	0	Lekno	Lekno	Wongrowitz	Lekno	Lekno		
Biberfeld	Rudnicze / Bobrowniki?	Village	337	6	331	0	Wongrowitz	Wongrowitz	Wongrowitz	Wongrowitz	Wongrowitz	(Rudnitsch&Bobrowniki Kolonie)	
Biniewo Marlewo		Village	79	31	48	0	Sierniki	Schokken	Wongrowitz	Rogasen	Rogasen	(Bieniewo)	
Bismarksaue	Pokrzywnica	Village	89	44	45	0	Wongrowitz	Wongrowitz	Wongrowitz	Prusietz	Wongrowitz		
Blischütz	Bliżyce	Village	242	101	141	0	Schokken	Schokken	Wongrowitz	Ratschkowo	Revier		
Blumenfelde	Runowskie / Runowskie huby	Village	93	87	6	0	Wongrowitz	Wongrowitz	Wongrowitz	Potulice	Kaisersaue	(Runowo Hauland)	
Bobrownik	Bobrowniki	Estate	90	0	90	0	Wongrowitz	Wongrowitz	Wongrowitz	Wongrowitz	Wongrowitz		
Bracholin	Bracholin	Village	181	27	154	0	Lekno	Lekno	Wongrowitz	Lekno	Lekno		
Briesen Hauland	Brzeźno / Brzeźna	Village	68	61	7	0	Neu Briesen	Wongrowitz	Wongrowitz	Budsin	Jankendorf		
Brüderhausen	Siedleczko	Village	257	180	77	0	Lekno	Lekno	Wongrowitz	Lekno	Lekno		
Brzeskowo	Brzeskowo	Village	56	9	47	0	Proberen	Schokken	Wongrowitz	Kirchen Popowo	Sarbia		
Budziejewo	Budziejewo	Village	62	34	28	0	Proberen	Mietschisko	Wongrowitz	Kirchen Popowo	Sarbia	(Ruhstein)	
Budziejewo	Budziejewo	Estate	137	6	131	0	Proberen	Mietschisko	Wongrowitz	Proberen	Sarbia		
Bukowitz	Bukowiec / Bukowie	Village	172	92	80	0	Wongrowitz	Wongrowitz	Wongrowitz	Wongrowitz	Wongrowitz	(Buchenhöfe)	
Buschfelde	Mikołajewo	Village	106	62	44	0	Wongrowitz	Wongrowitz	Wongrowitz	Prusietz	Kaisersaue		
Bärenbusch	Niedźwiedziny / Berenbusch	Village	95	40	55	0	Revier	Schokken	Wongrowitz	Kirchen Dombrowka	Revier	'Behrenbusch'	
Chawlodno	Chawłodno	Village	282	19	263	0	Gollantsch	Gollantsch	Exin	Gollantsch	Gollantsch		
Chocischewo	Chociszewo	Estate	109	18	91	0	Proberen	Schokken	Wongrowitz	Proberen	Schokken	(Tannenhof)	
Choyna	Chojna	Village	433	36	397	0	Choyna	Gollantsch	Exin	Choyna	Gollantsch	(Choien;Hoyen)	
Czerlin	Czarlin	Village	134	12	122	0	Czerlin	Gollantsch	Exin	Czeschewo	Gollantsch		
Czerlin	Czarlin	Estate	197	11	186	0	Czerlin	Gollantsch	Exin	Czerlin	Gollantsch		
Czeschewo	Czeszewo	Village	146	1	145	0	Czerlin	Gollantsch	Exin	Czeschewo	Gollantsch		
Czeschewo	Czeszewo	Estate	294	0	294	0	Czerlin	Gollantsch	Exin	Czerlin	Gollantsch		
Damaslaw	Damasław	Estate	282	45	235	0	Ritscherheim	Lekno	Wongrowitz	Ritscherheim	Groß Mirkowitz		
Danaborz	Danaborz	Estate	79	9	70	0	Tonischewo	Lekno	Wongrowitz	Tonischewo	Wongrowitz		
Deutsch Briesen	Brzeźno niemieckie	Village	206	24	182	0	Lekno	Lekno	Wongrowitz	Lekno	Lekno		
Deutschfeld	Szczodrochowo	Village	65	61	4	0	Revier	Schokken	Wongrowitz	Kirchen Dombrowka	Revier		
Dobiejewo	Dobijewo	Village	140	1	139	0	Lopienno	Mietschisko	Wongrowitz	Lopienno	Bismarcksfelde		
Dornbrunn	Dąbrowa	Village	491	322	169	0	Ritscherheim	Lekno	Wongrowitz	Juncewo	Groß Mirkowitz	(Dombrowo)	
Durowo	Durowo	Estate	100	32	68	0	Wongrowitz	Wongrowitz	Wongrowitz	Wongrowitz	Wongrowitz		
Eichhausen	Kamienice	Village	94	74	20	0	Neu Briesen	Wongrowitz	Wongrowitz	Budsin	Budsin	(Kamnitz)	
Eichwald	Wiatrowo	Village	94	73	21	0	Wongrowitz	Wongrowitz	Wongrowitz	Prusietz	Wongrowitz		
Elsenau	Damasławek	Estate	338	117	221	0	Ritscherheim	Lekno	Wongrowitz	Ritscherheim	Groß Mirkowitz		
Frauengarten	Panigrodz	Village	134	18	109	7	Czerlin	Gollantsch	Exin	Panigrodz	Exin		
Frauengarten	Panigrodz	Estate	85	5	80	0	Czerlin	Gollantsch	Exin	Czerlin	Exin		
Friedrichshof	Frydrychowo	Estate	105	22	83	0	Lopienno	Mietschisko	Wongrowitz	Lopienno	Bismarcksfelde	(Friedrichsfelde)	
Glinno	Glinno	Estate	180	0	180	0	Schokken	Schokken	Exin	Schokken	Schokken		
Gollantsch	Gołańcz	Town	1036	202	731	103	Gollantsch	Gollantsch	Wongrowitz	Gollantsch	Gollantsch	(Schwertburg)	
Gollantsch Smolary		Estate	363	10	353	0	Gollantsch	Gollantsch	Wongrowitz	Gollantsch	Gollantsch		
Gorzewo	Górzewo	Village	30	9	21	0	Mietschisko	Mietschisko	Wongrowitz	Mietschisko	Groß Golle		
Gorzewo	Górzewo	Estate	176	1	175	0	Nietschisko	Mietschisko	Wongrowitz	Nietschisko	Groß Golle		
Grabowo	Grabowo	Village	171	94	77	0	Gollantsch	Gollantsch	Margonin	Gollantsch	Gollantsch	(Grabendorf)	
Grenschin	Grzęznin	Estate	77	0	77	0	Lekno	Gollantsch	Wongrowitz	Lekno	Gollantsch		
Groß Golle	Gołaszewo / Goła	Village	244	130	113	1	Lopienno	Mietschisko	Wongrowitz	Lopienno	Groß Golle		
Groß Laskownica	Łaskawnica wielka	Estate	241	222	19	0	Gollantsch	Gollantsch	Wongrowitz	Gollantsch	Gollantsch		
Groß Mirkowitz	Mirkowice	Village	121	73	48	0	Mietschisko	Mietschisko	Wongrowitz	Kozielsko	Groß Mirkowitz	(Groß Mirkhof)	
Gruntowitz	Gruntowice	Village	215	72	143	0	Ritscherheim	Lekno	Wongrowitz	Kozielsko	Groß Mirkowitz		
Grylewo	Grylewo	Estate	360	0	360	0	Tonischewo	Gollantsch	Wongrowitz	Tonischewo	Wongrowitz		
Grünheim	Bogdanowo / Buszewo	Village	96	17	79	0	Gollantsch	Gollantsch	Margonin	Gollantsch	Gollantsch		
Grzybowo	Grzybowo	Village	141	39	102	0	Sierniki	Schokken	Wongrowitz	Lechlin	Schokken		
Hagenau	Wiśniewko	Village	157	137	20	0	Lekno	Lekno	Wongrowitz	Czeschewo	Lekno	(Hagenau Dorf)	
Hochfeld	Chociszewko / Chociszewo	Village	55	39	16	0	Proberen	Schokken	Wongrowitz	Lechlin	Schokken	(Chocischewo)	
Hohenheim	Wysoka	Village	147	121	26	0	Revier	Schokken	Wongrowitz	Kirchen Dombrowka	Revier		
Hohenpodlesche	Podlesie wysokie	Village	146	5	141	0	Proberen	Schokken	Wongrowitz	Kirchen Popowo	Sarbia	(H. Podlesie)	
Hohenwalden	Podlaski wysokie / Podlesie wysokie	Estate	128	124	4	0	Proberen	Schokken	Exin	Proberen	Sarbia	(Hohenwalde)	
Idasheim	Łęgniszewo	Estate	143	25	118	0	Czerlin	Gollantsch	Wongrowitz	Czerlin	Gollantsch		
Jabkowo	Jablkowo	Village	98	11	87	0	Proberen	Schokken	Wongrowitz	Ratschkowo	Schokken		
Jabkowo	Jablkowo	Estate	266	3	263	0	Proberen	Schokken	Wongrowitz	Proberen	Schokken		
Jakubowo	Jakubowo	Village	100	76	24	0	Neu Briesen	Wongrowitz	Wongrowitz	Prusietz	Kaisersaue	(Modderhaulandei&Welnatal)	
Jankowo	Jankowo	Village	58	16	42	0	Wongrowitz	Wongrowitz	Wongrowitz	Wongrowitz	Wongrowitz		
Jaroschau	Jaroszewo	Village	304	192	112	0	Jaroschau	Mietschisko	Margonin	Kietzko	Jaroschau	Kirchen Popowo was alternate Catholic parish	
Jeziorki	Jeziorki	Village	107	17	90	0	Choyna	Gollantsch	Wongrowitz	Choyna	Gollantsch		
Josephowo	Józefowo	Village	75	0	75	0	Neu Briesen	Wongrowitz	Wongrowitz	Potulice	Kaisersaue		
Josephsthal	Durowskie huby / Kaliska	Village	130	43	87	0	Wongrowitz	Wongrowitz	Wongrowitz	Wongrowitz	Wongrowitz	(Waldhof)	
Kaisersaue	Runowo	Village	255	205	50	0	Neu Briesen	Wongrowitz	Wongrowitz	Rogasen	Kaisersaue		
Kalischan	Kaliszany	Estate	222	0	222	0	Tonischewo	Wongrowitz	Wongrowitz	Tonischewo	Wongrowitz		
Kalischan Kolonie		Village	185	20	165	0	Tonischewo	Wongrowitz	Wongrowitz	Wilhelmstreu	Wongrowitz		
Kamnitz	Kamienice	Village	187	73	114	0	Neu Briesen	Wongrowitz	Wongrowitz	Wilhelmstreu	Wongrowitz		
Kiedrowo	Kiedrowo	Village	135	17	118	0	Lekno	Lekno	Wongrowitz	Lekno	Lekno		
Kirchen Podlesche	Podlesie kościelne	Village	45	0	45	0	Proberen	Mietschisko	Wongrowitz	Kirchen Podlesche	Sarbia	(K. Podlesie)	
Kirchen Podlesche	Podlesie kościelne	Estate	149	0	149	0	Proberen	Mietschisko	Wongrowitz	Proberen	Sarbia	(K. Podlesie)	
Kirchen Popowo	Popowo kościelne	Village	221	15	206	0	Proberen	Mietschisko	Wongrowitz	Kirchen Popowo	Sarbia		
Kirchen Popowo	Popowo kościelne	Estate	249	30	219	0	Proberen	Mietschisko	Wongrowitz	Proberen	Sarbia		
Klein Golle	Gólka	Village	67	13	54	0	Lopienno	Mietschisko	Wongrowitz	Lopienno	Groß Golle		
Klein Laskownica	Łaskawnica mala	Village	13	0	13	0	Gollantsch	Gollantsch	Wongrowitz	Grylewo	Gollantsch		
Klein Laskownica	Łaskawnica mala	Estate	128	1	127	0	Gollantsch	Gollantsch	Margonin	Gollantsch	Gollantsch		
Klein Mirkowitz	Mirkowiczki	Village	127	36	91	0	Mietschisko	Mietschisko	Exin	Kozielsko	Groß Mirkowitz		
Klemkenhof	Klemnisko / Podolińskie huby	Village	42	1	41	0	Mokronos	Lekno	Wongrowitz	Srebnagora	Lindenbrück		
Kludsin	KlódzinKludzin	Village	280	229	51	0	Jaroschau	Mietschisko	Wongrowitz	Lopienno	Bismarcksfelde	(Schlüsselried)	
Kobyletz	Kobylec	Village	182	115	67	0	Wongrowitz	Wongrowitz	Wongrowitz	Wongrowitz	Wongrowitz		
Kolybki	Kolybki	Estate	289	0	289	0	Mokronos	Lekno	Wongrowitz	Mokronos	Lekno		
Konary	Konary	Village	66	21	45	0	Gollantsch	Gollantsch	Wongrowitz	Margonin	Gollantsch		
Konary	Konary	Estate	163	13	150	0	Gollantsch	Gollantsch	Wongrowitz	Gollantsch	Gollantsch		
Koninek	Koninek	Village	209	0	209	0	Lekno	Lekno	Wongrowitz	Lekno	Lekno		
Kopanin	Kopanina	Estate	274	2	272	0	Mokronos	Lekno	Exin	Mokronos	Lekno		
Kopaschin	Kopaszyn	Village	218	146	72	0	Tonischewo	Wongrowitz	Wongrowitz	Grylewo	Wongrowitz		
Kozielsko	Kozielsko	Village	170	0	170	0	Ritscherheim	Lekno	Wongrowitz	Kozielsko	Groß Mirkowitz		
Krosno	Krosno	Village	185	32	153	0	Lekno	Lekno	Wongrowitz	Wongrowitz	Wongrowitz		
Kujawki	Kujawki	Estate	91	7	84	0	Mokronos	Gollantsch	Wongrowitz	Mokronos	Gollantsch		
Körnersfelde	Czesławice	Estate	443	64	379	0	Choyna	Gollantsch	Wongrowitz	Choyna	Gollantsch	(Charlottenhof&Czeslawitz)	
Langendorf	Długawies	Village	118	0	118	0	Schreibersdorf	Wongrowitz	Wongrowitz	Wongrowitz	Wongrowitz		
Laziska	Łaziska	Village	282	36	246	0	Wongrowitz	Wongrowitz	Wongrowitz	Wongrowitz	Wongrowitz		
Lechlin	Lechlin	Estate	211	12	199	0	Sierniki	Schokken	Wongrowitz	Sierniki	Schokken		
Lechlin Dorf		Village	81	10	71	0	Sierniki	Schokken	Wongrowitz	Lechlin	Schokken		
Lechlin Hauland		Village	91	32	59	0	Sierniki	Schokken	Wongrowitz	Lechlin	Schokken		
Lekno	Łekno	Village	663	75	582	0	Lekno	Lekno	Wongrowitz	Lekno	Lekno	(Klostersee)	
Lekno	Łekno	Estate	230	147	83	0	Lekno	Lekno	Wongrowitz	Lekno	Lekno		
Lengowo	Łęgowo	Village	344	32	312	0	Wongrowitz	Wongrowitz	Wongrowitz	Wongrowitz	Wongrowitz	(Entenflug)	
Liebenau	Miłoslawice / Miłosławskie olędry; Bagno / Bagna;J	Village	250	77	173	0	Lopienno	Mietschisko	Wongrowitz	Lopienno	Groß Golle		
Lopienno	Łopienno	Village	1108	37	1066	0	Lopienno	Mietschisko	Wongrowitz	Lopienno	Janowitz	(Seegrund)	
Lopienno	Łopienno	Estate	210	41	169	0	Lopienno	Mietschisko	Wongrowitz	Lopienno	Janowitz		
Loschinjetz	Losiniec Nowy / Losiniec	Estate	419	1	418	0	Proberen	Schokken	Wongrowitz	Proberen	Sarbia	(Loschütz)	
Loschwitz	Losiniec	Village	75	23	52	0	Proberen	Schokken	Wongrowitz	Kirchen Popowo	Sarbia	(Loschinjetz)	
Lukowo	Łukowo	Village	114	0	114	0	Lekno	Lekno	Wongrowitz	Lekno	Gollantsch		
Lukowo	Łukowo	Estate	242	0	242	0	Lekno	Lekno	Wongrowitz	Lekno	Gollantsch		
Micharzewo	Micharzewo	Estate	83	0	83	0	Lekno	Lekno	Exin	Lekno	Wongrowitz	(Michelshof; Michelsdorf)	
Mietschisko	Mieścisko	Town	1196	122	1049	25	Mietschisko	Mietschisko	Wongrowitz	Mietschisko	Groß Golle	(Markstädt; Mietschisk)	
Mietschisko Abbau	Mieściska ulica	Village	169	44	125	0	Mietschisko	Mietschisko	Wongrowitz	Mietschisko	Groß Golle		
Miloslawitz	Miłosławice	Village	335	271	64	0	Jaroschau	Mietschisko	Wongrowitz	Mietschisko	Groß Golle	(Bödekersdorf)	
Mionza	Miąża	Village	152	0	152	0	Ritscherheim	Lekno	Wongrowitz	Kozielsko	Groß Mirkowitz		
Mokronos	Mokronosy	Village	392	11	381	0	Mokronos	Lekno	Exin	Srebnagora	Lekno		
Morakowo	Morakowo	Village	166	0	166	0	Czerlin	Gollantsch	Wongrowitz	Czeschewo	Gollantsch	(Morkau)	
Morakowo	Morakowo	Estate	420	381	33	0	Czerlin	Gollantsch	Wongrowitz	Czerlin	Gollantsch		
Neu Briesen	Brzeźno Nowe / Brzeźno polskie	Village	5	5	0	0	Neu Briesen	Wongrowitz	Wongrowitz	Potulice	Jankendorf	(Polnisch Briesen)	
Neu Briesen	Brzeźno polskie	Estate	466	347	119	0	Neu Briesen	Wongrowitz	Wongrowitz	Neu Briesen	Jankendorf	(Polnisch Briesen)	
Neugrund		Village	225	80	145	0	Revier	Schokken	Wongrowitz	Kirchen Dombrowka	Revier		
Neuhausen	Łaziska	Estate	174	15	159	0	Wongrowitz	Wongrowitz	Wongrowitz	Wongrowitz	Wongrowitz		
Niedarzyn	Niedarzyn	Village	35	26	9	0	Revier	Schokken	Wongrowitz	Ratschkowo	Revier		
Niemtschin	Niemczyn	Village	91	7	84	0	Lekno	Lekno	Wongrowitz	Kozielsko	Lekno	(Niehof)	
Niemtschin	Niemczyn	Estate	311	235	76	0	Lekno	Lekno	Wongrowitz	Lekno	Lekno		
Niemtschinek	Niemczynek	Estate	375	323	52	0	Lekno	Lekno	Wongrowitz	Lekno	Lekno		
Nieswiastowice	Nieświastowice	Village	36	8	28	0	Jaroschau	Mietschisko	Wongrowitz	Kirchen Popowo	Sarbia		
Nieswiastowice	Nieświastowice	Estate	157	0	157	0	Jaroschau	Mietschisko	Wongrowitz	Jaroschau	Sarbia		
Nowen	Nowe / Nowesołectwo	Village	304	116	188	0	Wongrowitz	Wongrowitz	Wongrowitz	Grylewo	Wongrowitz	(Noven; Neuhof)	
Ochodza	Ochodza	Village	292	9	283	0	Schreibersdorf	Wongrowitz	Wongrowitz	Wongrowitz	Wongrowitz		
Oschütz	Ochodza	Estate	80	14	66	0	Schreibersdorf	Wongrowitz	Wongrowitz	Schreibersdorf	Wongrowitz		
Osten	Przysieczyń / Przysieka	Village	171	63	108	0	Schreibersdorf	Wongrowitz	Wongrowitz	Lechlin	Schokken	(Przysiecka Hauland)	
Panigrodz Kolonie	Panigrodz	Village	116	0	116	0	Czerlin	Gollantsch	Exin	Panigrodz	Gollantsch		
Pawlowko	Pawłówko	Estate	41	2	39	0	Tonischewo	Wongrowitz	Wongrowitz	Tonischewo	Wongrowitz		
b Gollantsch	Pawłowo / Pawłowo Zonskie	Estate	293	267	25	0	Tonischewo	Wongrowitz	Wongrowitz	Tonischewo	Wongrowitz	(Paulsfeld)	
b Schokken	Pawłowo	Estate	289	5	284	0	Revier	Schokken	Wongrowitz	Revier	Revier		
bei Schokken	Pawłowo	Village	27	0	27	0	Revier	Schokken	Wongrowitz	Kirchen Dombrowka	Revier		
Peda	Peda	Estate	8	7	1	0	Proberen	Schokken	Exin	Proberen	Schokken		
Plonskowo Dorf		Village	146	17	129	0	Proberen	Schokken	Wongrowitz	Kirchen Popowo	Sarbia		
Plonskowo Kolonie		Village	39	11	28	0	Proberen	Schokken	Wongrowitz	Kirchen Popowo	Sarbia		
Podieziorze	Podjezierze	Village	48	0	48	0	Gollantsch	Gollantsch	Wongrowitz	Gollantsch	Gollantsch		
Podolin	Podolin	Estate	169	7	162	0	Mokronos	Gollantsch	Wongrowitz	Mokronos	Lindenbrück	(Salzberg)	
Pomarzanki	Pomarzanki	Village	48	0	48	0	Jaroschau	Schokken	Wongrowitz	Ratschkowo	Schokken		
Pomarzanki	Pomarzanki	Estate	110	1	109	0	Jaroschau	Schokken	Wongrowitz	Jaroschau	Schokken		
Popowo Kolonie		Village	181	53	128	0	Proberen	Mietschisko	Wongrowitz	Kirchen Popowo	Sarbia		
Potulice	Potulice	Estate	435	1	434	0	Neu Briesen	Wongrowitz	Wongrowitz	Potulice	Kaisersaue		
Potulin	Potulin	Village	106	0	106	0	Choyna	Gollantsch	Exin	Choyna	Gollantsch		
Proberen	Kuszewo	Village	176	155	21	0	Proberen	Schokken	Wongrowitz	Kirchen Popowo	Sarbia	(Brombeere)	
Prusietz	Prusietz	Village	238	24	214	0	Sierniki	Schokken	Wongrowitz	Prusietz	Rogasen		
Przysieka	Przysieka	Estate	196	0	196	0	Schreibersdorf	Schokken	Wongrowitz	Lechlin	Schokken		
Przysieka Dorf		Village	38	0	38	0	Schreibersdorf	Schokken	Wongrowitz	Lechlin	Schokken		
Ratschkowo	Raczkowo	Village	49	0	49	0	Proberen	Schokken	Wongrowitz	Ratschkowo	Schokken		
Ratschkowo	Raczkowo	Estate	154	0	154	0	Proberen	Schokken	Wongrowitz	Ratschkowo	Schokken		
Redgosch	Redgoszcz	Estate	574	1	573	0	Mietschisko	Mietschisko	Wongrowitz	Lekno	Groß Mirkowitz		
Redgosch Kolonie		Village	81	0	81	0	Mietschisko	Mietschisko	Wongrowitz	Lekno	Groß Mirkowitz		
Revier	Rojówiec	Village	251	113	138	0	Revier	Schokken	Wongrowitz	Kirchen Dombrowka	Revier	(Grüningshof)	
Rgielsko	Rgielsko	Village	278	7	271	0	Wongrowitz	Wongrowitz	Wongrowitz	Wongrowitz	Wongrowitz	(Seehausen)	
Ritscherheim	Międzylisie	Village	288	215	73	0	Ritscherheim	Lekno	Wongrowitz	Kozielsko	Groß Mirkowitz		
Rombschin	Rąbczyn	Estate	692	575	117	0	Mietschisko	Mietschisko	Wongrowitz	Lekno	Wongrowitz	(Lindenhof; Grünlinden)	
Rombschin Forstgutsbezirk		Estate	0	0	0	0	Mietschisko	Mietschisko	Wongrowitz				
Rombschin Kolonie	Romczyn	Village	68	17	51	0	Mietschisko	Mietschisko	Wongrowitz	Lekno	Wongrowitz		
Roschkowko	Roschkówko	Village	78	24	54	0	Schreibersdorf	Schokken	Wongrowitz	Schokken	Schokken		
Roschkowo	Roschkowo	Estate	367	11	356	0	Schokken	Schokken	Wongrowitz	Schokken	Schokken		
Roscinno	Rościnno	Estate	183	76	107	0	Schokken	Schokken	Wongrowitz	Lechlin	Schokken	(Roschinno;Hammerfeld)	
Ruda Kozlonka	Ruda / Ruda Kozlanka	Village	160	79	81	0	Mietschisko	Mietschisko	Wongrowitz	Mietschisko	Sarbia	(Waldmühle)	
Rudnitsch	Rudnicze	Village	107	32	75	0	Wongrowitz	Wongrowitz	Wongrowitz	Rogasen	Wongrowitz		
Ruhleben	Wojciechowo	Village	80	70	10	0	Sierniki	Schokken	Wongrowitz	Prusietz	Rogasen		
Runowo Hufen		Village	34	9	25	0	Neu Briesen	Wongrowitz	Wongrowitz	Rogasen	Kaisersaue		
Rybowo	Rybowo	Village	12	0	12	0	Gollantsch	Gollantsch	Wongrowitz	Grylewo	Gollantsch		
Rybowo	Rybowo	Estate	289	9	280	0	Gollantsch	Gollantsch	Wongrowitz	Grylewo	Gollantsch		
Sarbia	Sarbia	Village	181	39	142	0	Schreibersdorf	Mietschisko	Wongrowitz	Kirchen Podlesche	Sarbia		
Sarbia	Sarbia	Estate	195	167	28	0	Schreibersdorf	Mietschisko	Wongrowitz	Kirchen Podlesche	Sarbia		
Sarbka	Sarbka	Village	182	98	84	0	Neu Briesen	Wongrowitz	Wongrowitz	Wilhelmstreu	Wongrowitz		
Schokken	Skoki	Town	1363	510	741	112	Schokken	Schokken	Wongrowitz	Schokken	Schokken		
Schokken	Skoki	Estate	227	37	190	0	Schokken	Schokken	Wongrowitz	Schokken	Schokken		
Schreibersdorf	Sienno	Village	215	184	31	0	Schreibersdorf	Wongrowitz	Wongrowitz	Wongrowitz	Sarbia		
Schwanau	Dzwonowo	Village	84	18	66	0	Revier	Schokken	Wongrowitz	Kirchen Dombrowka	Revier		
Schwanau Forstgutsbezirk		Estate	32	31	1	0	Revier	Schokken	Wongrowitz	Kirchen Dombrowka	Revier		
Seehausen	Rgielsko	Estate	181	33	148	0	Wongrowitz	Wongrowitz	Wongrowitz	Wongrowitz	Wongrowitz		
Sienno	Sienno	Village	99	0	99	0	Schreibersdorf	Wongrowitz	Wongrowitz	Wongrowitz	Sarbia		
Sierniki	Sierniki	Estate	604	0	604	0	Sierniki	Schokken	Wongrowitz	Ragasen	Rogasen		
Smoguletz	Smogulec	Estate	594	29	565	0	Choyna	Gollantsch	Exin	Smoguletz	Gollantsch		
Smolary	Smolary	Village	190	28	162	0	Gollantsch	Gollantsch	Exin	Gollantsch	Gollantsch	'tar oven'	
Smuschewo	Smuszewo	Village	181	0	181	0	Mokronos	Lekno	Wongrowitz	Srebnagora	Lekno		
Smuschewo	Smuszewo	Estate	209	1	208	0	Mokronos	Lekno	Wongrowitz	Srebnagora	Lekno		
Spiegel	Oporzyn	Village	168	88	62	0	Tonischewo	Gollantsch	Wongrowitz	Wilhelmstreu	Margonin		
Springberg	Łopieński folwark	Village	88	28	60	0	Lopienno	Mietschisko	Wongrowitz	Lopienno	Groß Golle		
Srebnagora	Srebrnagóra	Village	87	0	87	0	Mokronos	Lekno	Exin	Srebnagora	Lindenbrück		
Starenschin	Starężyn	Estate	149	0	149	0	Ritscherheim	Lekno	Wongrowitz	Juncewo	Groß Mirkowitz		
Stawiny	Stawiany	Estate	261	3	258	0	Revier	Schokken	Wongrowitz	Kirchen Dombrowka	Revier		
Steinrode	Grzybowo / Grzybowice	Village	136	78	58	0	Sierniki	Schokken	Wongrowitz	Lechlin	Schokken		
Stempuchowa	Stępuchowa	Village	60	0	60	0	Lekno	Lekno	Wongrowitz	Kozielsko	Groß Mirkowitz		
Stempuchowo	Stępuchowa	Estate	305	10	295	0	Lekno	Lekno	Wongrowitz	Kozielsko	Groß Mirkowitz	(Steinbockshof)	
Stolenschin	Stołężyn	Village	57	0	57	0	Czerlin	Gollantsch	Exin	Panigrodz	Exin		
Stolenschin	Stołężyn	Estate	299	39	260	0	Czerlin	Gollantsch	Exin	Panigrodz	Exin		
Tarnowo	Tarnowo	Village	218	3	215	0	Lekno	Lekno	Wongrowitz	Wongrowitz	Lekno		
Tomschütz	Tomczyce	Village	263	61	202	0	Gollantsch	Gollantsch	Margonin	Gollantsch	Gollantsch		
Tonischewo	Toniszewo	Village	284	0	284	0	Tonischewo	Wongrowitz	Wongrowitz	Wilhelmstreu	Wongrowitz		
Turza	Turża	Village	579	15	564	0	Mokronos	Lekno	Wongrowitz	Srebnagora	Exin		
Wapno	Wapno	Village	101	3	98	0	Mokronos	Gollantsch	Exin	Srebnagora	Lindenbrück	(Salzhof)	
Wapno	Wapno	Estate	338	42	296	0	Mokronos	Gollantsch	Exin	Srebnagora	Lindenbrück		
Werkowo	Werkowo	Village	44	0	44	0	Lekno	Lekno	Wongrowitz	Lekno	Groß Mirkowitz	(Freihohenstein; Hohenstein)	
Wiatrowo	Wiatrowo	Estate	371	15	356	0	Schreibersdorf	Wongrowitz	Wongrowitz	Prusietz	Wongrowitz		
Wiatrowo Dorf		Village	95	0	95	0	Schreibersdorf	Wongrowitz	Wongrowitz	Prusietz	Wongrowitz		
Wiegenau	Kolybki	Village	120	7	113	0	Lekno	Lekno	Wongrowitz	Lekno	Lekno		
Wiela	Wiele / Wiela	Village	145	79	66	0	Mietschisko	Mietschisko	Wongrowitz	Mietschisko	Groß Golle	(Altdorf)	
Wiesenfeld		Village	64	56	8	0	Neu Briesen	Wongrowitz	Wongrowitz	Potulice	Rogasen	(Potulitz Hauland)	
Wisniewo	Wiśniewo	Village	27	1	26	0	Lekno	Lekno	Wongrowitz	Czeschewo	Lekno		
Wisniewo	Wiśniewo	Estate	184	0	184	0	Lekno	Lekno	Wongrowitz	Czeschewo	Lekno		
Wongrowitz	Wągrowiec / Wągrodziec	Town	6040	1393	4264	383	Wongrowitz	Wongrowitz	Wongrowitz	Wongrowitz	Wongrowitz	(Eichenbrück)	
Zabitschin		Village	72	3	69	0	Mietschisko	Mietschisko	Wongrowitz	Mietschisko	Groß Mirkowitz		
Zbietka	Zbietka	Village	43	21	22	0	Schreibersdorf	Mietschisko	Wongrowitz	Kirchen Podlesche	Sarbia		
Zbietka	Zbietka	Estate	143	0	143	0	Schreibersdorf	Mietschisko	Wongrowitz	Kirchen Podlesche	Sarbia		
Zelice		Village	292	10	282	0	Neu Briesen	Wongrowitz	Wongrowitz	Potulice	Wongrowitz		
Zelice		Estate	367	0	367	0	Neu Briesen	Wongrowitz	Wongrowitz	Potulice	Wongrowitz		
Zwölfhufen	Glogowinjetz	Estate	102	11	91	0	Czerlin	Gollantsch	Exin	Exin	Exin		

Town	Polish Spelling	Type	1905 Pop	Dwellings	Belonged to...	Notes
Albertinowo			76	11	Neu Briesen	
Antoniewo			57	3	Glinno	
Biniewo			33	5	Biniewo Marlewo	
Bobrowko Forsthaus			5	1	Durowo	
Bogdanowo			103	6	Gollantsch Smolary	
Brachfelde			53	4	Alt Panigrodz	
Brdowo			75	4	Czeschewo	
Budki			32	1	Smoguletz	Cath=Choyna
Büddow			35	3	Czerlin	
Bärenbusch			36	4	Neugrund	'Behrenbusch'
Charlottenhof			84	4	Körnersfelde	
Durowko Vorwerk			6	1	Durowo	
Durowo Chausseehaus			5	1	Durowo	
Dzwonowo			32	3	Neugrund	
Elsenau Bahnhof			145	12	Elsenau	
Fankowo			24	2	Przysieka Dorf	
Friemark Forsthaus			13	2	Durowo	
Gorzewo Vorwerk			51	1	Gorzewo	
Gut Jelen mit Waldwärterhaus			76	5	Smoguletz	Cath=Choyna
Ignacewo			21	2	Stawiny	
Jabkowko			26	1	Pomarzanki	
Jaroschau I	Jaroszewo		156	15	Jaroschau	(Birkengras;Birkenwald)
Jaroschau II			148	18	Jaroschau	
Julienau			23	3	Lopienno	
Kaisersaue Bahnhof			10	1	Kaisersaue	
Kalischanki Ansiedelung			116	16	Kalischan	
Karlshof	Kaszary		20	2	Schokken	(Carlshof)
Karolinenhof			35	2	Seehausen	
Karolinenhof			29	3	Niemtschin	
Kopanin Ziegelei			16	1	Kopanin	
Kozlonka Villa			11	2	Ruda Kozlonka	
Kozlonka Vorwerk			66	4	Ruda Kozlonka	
Krzyzanki			121	5	Gollantsch Smolary	
Kurki			37	3	Przysieka	
Körnershöh			16	1	Stolenschin	
Lakinski Denkmal			7	1	Neuhausen	
Leonardowo			5	1	Elsenau	
Lopienno Propsteivorwerk			28	2	Lopienno	
Ludwikowo			74	6	Lekno	
Marcinkowo			15	1	Langendorf	
Marcyanowo			19	4	Niemtschin	
Marlewo			85	4	Sierniki	
Marlewo			46	6	Biniewo Marlewo	
Marynka			10	1	Wiatrowo	
Meyskermühle			20	1	Smoguletz	
Michalkowitz			40	2	Zelice	
Mionczynek			28	3	Neugrund	
Mlynki			9	1	Stawiny	
Modrzewie			41	1	Stempuchowo	
Modrzewie			32	3	Stempuchowa	
Mostki mit Forsthaus			41	3	Smoguletz	
Mrowinietz			148	20	Rombschin	
Naroschnik			5	1	Neugrund	
Neudorf	Nowawieś		118	8	Rombschin	Cath=Wongrowitz
Neukrug	Nowygościniec		72	10	Steinrode	
Orla Forsthaus			5	1	Durowo	
Ostrowo bei Lopienno			79	14	Kludsin	SA=Lopienno
Ostrowo Mühle			47	4	Bismarksaue	
Ostrowo Vorwerk			38	2	Lukowo	Prot=Bismarcksfelde
Parkowo			59	2	Smoguletz	
Plebanki			26	4	Lekno	
Pontnowo			31	2	Stempuchowo	
Potulice Altvorwerk			42	3	Potulice	
Potulice Försterei			13	2	Potulice	
Potulice Mühle			19	3	Potulice	
Potulice Neuvorwerk			24	1	Potulice	
Potulin			110	5	Smoguletz	Cath=Choyna
Prostkowomühle			22	1	Smoguletz	(Prostkowo Vorwerk) Prot=Lindenwerder
Prusietz			156	9	Sierniki	Cath=Prusietz
Prusietz Chausseehaus			8	1	Prusietz	
Prusietzmühle			33	3	Prusietz	
Rakowo			183	7	Kolybki	SA=Lekno
Rakujady			118	11	Roschkowo	
Ralenczyn			15	1	Wiatrowo	
Revier Bahnhof			3	1	Stawiny	
Roschkowo Radmühle			29	2	Roschkowo	Cath=Ratschkowo; SA=Proberen
Ruda Mühle			11	1	Ruda Kozlonka	
Rutki			16	1	Lukowo	
Saschkowitz			76	5	Grylewo	
Schloßberg			4	1	Smoguletz	
Schokken Schneidemühle			37	2	Schokken	
Schokken Untermühle			7	1	Schokken	
Schubianki			23	3	Panigrodz Kolonie	
Slawa			12	1	Stawiny	
Smuschewo Vorwerk			18	1	Smuschewo	
Stare			100	4	Sierniki	Cath=Lechlin
Stare			13	2	Steinrode	
Starenschin			31	4	Mionza	
Starenzynek			39	3	Kopanin	Cath=Juncewo
Stempuchowo Bahnhof			9	1	Stempuchowo	
Straschewo			38	2	Rgielsko	
Streschkowo	Strzeszkowo		78	14	Miloslawitz	SA=Lopienno; (Hackstädt)
Tascharowo Vorwerk			23	2	Lengowo	
Theerofen Forsthaus			8	1	Smoguletz	Cath=Choyna
Tumidaj			14	1	Redgosch	Cath=Juncewo
Waltersheim			115	6	Wiatrowo	Cath=Lechlin
Wapienko			52	7	Wapno	
Wapno Bahnhof			6	1	Wapno	
Wapno Gipswerk			138	4	Wapno	
Werkowo			189	25	Niemtschinek	
Wiatrowo Wald			14	2	Wiatrowo	
Wilkonica Forsthaus			5	1	Stolenschin	
Wongrowitz Forsthaus			6	1	Durowo	
Wybranowko			88	13	Redgosch	Cath=Juncewo
Wymyslowo			79	8	Kirchen Popowo	
Zabitschin			202	9	Redgosch	Cath=Mietschiesko
Zakrzewo			137	6	Redgosch	Cath=Mietschiesko
Zelasko			37	2	Wiatrowo	
Zelice Forsthaus			3	1	Zelice	

== Military command ==
Kreis Wongrowitz was part of the military command

== Court system ==
The main court (German: Landgericht) was in Gnesen, also Bromberg and Schneidemühl, with smaller courts (German: Amtsgericht) in Wongrowitz (LG=Genesen), Exin (LG=Bromberg) and Margonin (LG=Schneidemühl).

== Standesämter ==
"Standesamt" is the German name of the local civil registration offices which were established in October 1874 soon after the German Empire was formed. Births, marriages and deaths were recorded. Previously, only the church records were used for Christians. In 1905, these Standesämter served towns in Kreis Wongrowitz:

Choyna	Lekno	Neu Briesen	Ritscherheim	Tonischewo
Czerlin	Lopienno	Nietschisko	Schokken	Wongrowitz
Gollantsch	Mietschisko	Proberen	Schreibersdorf	
Jaroschau	Mokronos	Revier	Sierniki	

== Police districts ==
In 1905, these police districts (German: Polizeidistrikt) served towns in Kreis Wongrowitz:

Gollantsch	Lekno	Mietschisko	Schokken	Wongrowitz

== Catholic churches ==
In 1905, these Catholic parish churches served towns in Kreis Wongrowitz:

Budsin	Jaroschau	Lechlin	Nietschisko	Revier	Srebnagora
Choyna	Juncewo	Lekno	Panigrodz	Ritscherheim	Tonischewo
Czerlin	Kietzko	Lopienno	Potulice	Rogasen	Wilhelmstreu
Czeschewo	Kirchen Dombrowka	Margonin	Proberen	Schokken	Wongrowitz
Exin	Kirchen Podlesche	Mietschisko	Prusietz	Schreibersdorf	
Gollantsch	Kirchen Popowo	Mokronos	Ragasen	Sierniki	
Grylewo	Kozielsko	Neu Briesen	Ratschkowo	Smoguletz	

== Protestant churches ==
In 1905, these Protestant parish churches served towns in Kreis Wongrowitz:

Bismarcksfelde	Groß Golle	Jaroschau	Margonin	Schokken
Budsin	Groß Mirkowitz	Kaisersaue	Revier	Wongrowitz
Exin	Jankendorf	Lekno	Rogasen	
Gollantsch	Janowitz	Lindenbrück	Sarbia	
