= Kołybiec =

- Village
- Location within Poland
- Coordinates: 52°51′01″N 17°21′55″E
- Country: Poland
- Voivodeship: Greater Poland
- County: Wągrowiec
- Gmina: Wągrowiec

Kołybiec [kɔˈwɨbjɛt͡s] is a village in the administrative district of Gmina Wągrowiec, within Wągrowiec County, Greater Poland Voivodeship, in west-central Poland.
