= Brzeźno Stare =

- Village
- Location within Poland
- Coordinates: 52°52′N 17°18′E
- Country: Poland
- Voivodeship: Greater Poland
- County: Wągrowiec
- Gmina: Wągrowiec

Brzeźno Stare [ˈbʐɛʑnɔ ˈstarɛ] is a village in the administrative district of Gmina Wągrowiec, within Wągrowiec County, Greater Poland Voivodeship, in west-central Poland.
