= Wiatrowiec =

Wiatrowiec may refer to the following places:

- Wiatrowiec, Greater Poland Voivodeship (west-central Poland)
- Wiatrowiec, Masovian Voivodeship (east-central Poland)
- Wiatrowiec, Warmian-Masurian Voivodeship (north Poland)
