= Orla, Wągrowiec County =

Orla
- Settlement
- Location within Poland
- Coordinates: 52°48′54″N 17°9′48″E
- Country: Poland
- Voivodeship: Greater Poland
- County: Wągrowiec
- Gmina: Wągrowiec

Orla [ˈɔrla] is a settlement in the administrative district of Gmina Wągrowiec, within Wągrowiec County, Greater Poland Voivodeship, in west-central Poland.
