= Żelice =

Żelice may refer to the following places:

- Żelice, Greater Poland Voivodeship (west-central Poland)
- Żelice, Pomeranian Voivodeship (north Poland)
- Żelice, West Pomeranian Voivodeship (north-west Poland)
