= Kurki, Greater Poland Voivodeship =

Kurki
- Settlement
- Location within Poland
- Coordinates: 52°43′58″N 17°10′18″E
- Country: Poland
- Voivodeship: Greater Poland
- County: Wągrowiec
- Gmina: Wągrowiec

Kurki [ˈkurki] is a settlement in the administrative district of Gmina Wągrowiec, within Wągrowiec County, Greater Poland Voivodeship, in west-central Poland.
