= Kamienica, Wągrowiec County =

Kamienica
- Village
- Location within Poland
- Coordinates: 52°52′40″N 17°6′53″E
- Country: Poland
- Voivodeship: Greater Poland
- County: Wągrowiec
- Gmina: Wągrowiec
- Population: 150

Kamienica [kamjɛˈnit͡sa] is a village in the administrative district of Gmina Wągrowiec, within Wągrowiec County, Greater Poland Voivodeship, in west-central Poland.
