= Bobrowniki, Wągrowiec County =

Bobrowniki
- Village
- Location within Poland
- Coordinates: 52°48′57″N 17°7′56″E
- Country: Poland
- Voivodeship: Greater Poland
- County: Wągrowiec
- Gmina: Wągrowiec
- Population: 160

Bobrowniki [bɔbrɔvˈniki] is a village in the administrative district of Gmina Wągrowiec, within Wągrowiec County, Greater Poland Voivodeship, in west-central Poland.
