= Nowa Wieś, Wągrowiec County =

Nowa Wieś
- Settlement
- Location within Poland
- Coordinates: 52°47′12″N 17°17′29″E
- Country: Poland
- Voivodeship: Greater Poland
- County: Wągrowiec
- Gmina: Wągrowiec

Nowa Wieś [ˈnɔva ˈvjɛɕ] is a settlement in the administrative district of Gmina Wągrowiec, within Wągrowiec County, Greater Poland Voivodeship, in west-central Poland.
