= Popowo Kościelne, Greater Poland Voivodeship =

Popowo Kościelne
- Village
- Location within Poland
- Coordinates: 52°43′N 17°16′E
- Country: Poland
- Voivodeship: Greater Poland
- County: Wągrowiec
- Gmina: Mieścisko

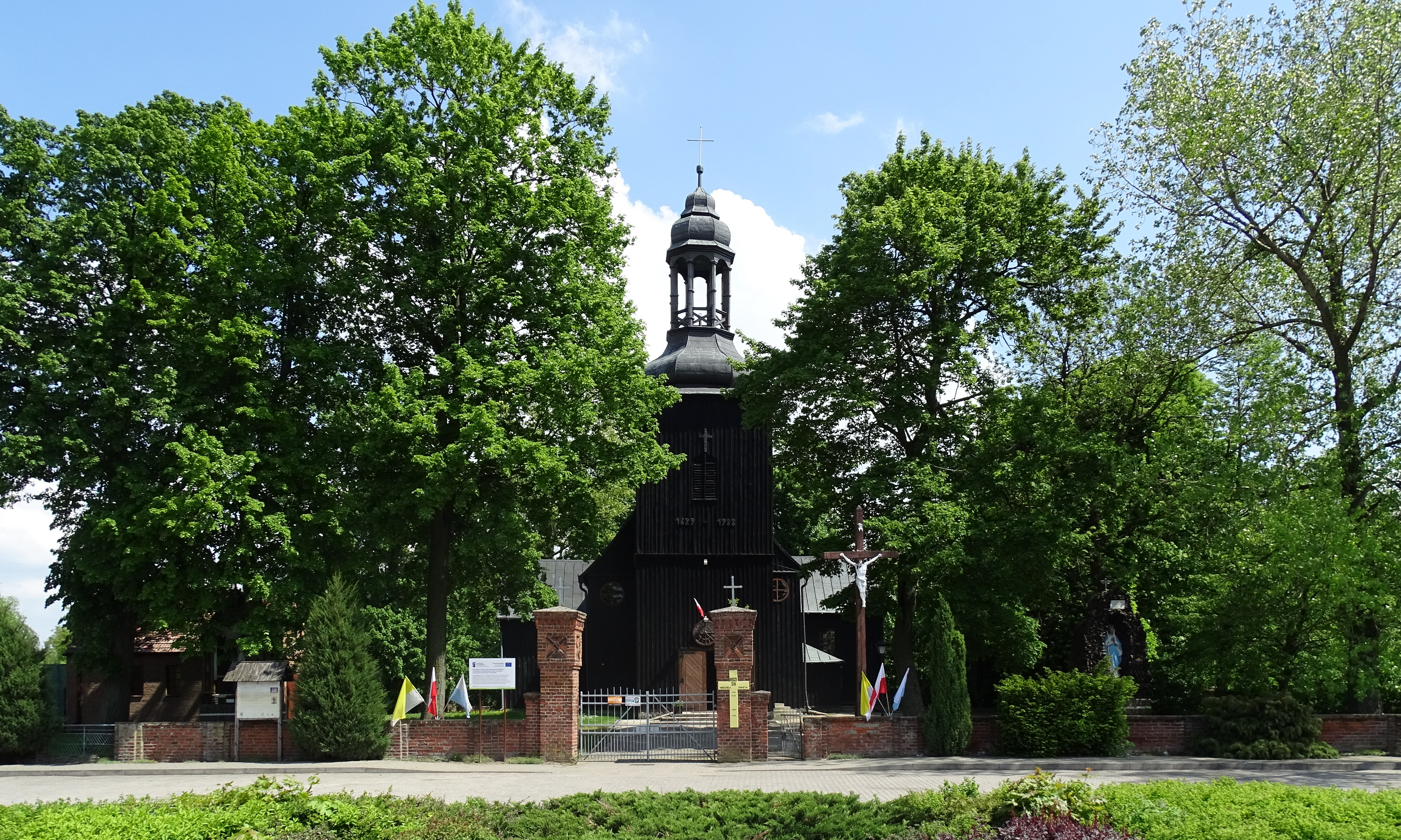
Wooden church dedicated to the Annunciation of the Blessed Virgin Mary. Built in 1629.

Popowo Kościelne [pɔˈpɔvɔ kɔɕˈt͡ɕɛlnɛ] is a village in the administrative district of Gmina Mieścisko, within Wągrowiec County, Greater Poland Voivodeship, in west-central Poland.
