= Rudnicze =

- Village
- Location within Poland
- Coordinates: 52°49′N 17°6′E
- Country: Poland
- Voivodeship: Greater Poland
- County: Wągrowiec
- Gmina: Wągrowiec

Rudnicze [rudˈnit͡ʂɛ] is a village in the administrative district of Gmina Wągrowiec, within Wągrowiec County, Greater Poland Voivodeship, in west-central Poland.
