= Ostrowo-Młyn =

- Settlement
- Location within Poland
- Coordinates: 52°47′16″N 17°09′05″E
- Country: Poland
- Voivodeship: Greater Poland
- County: Wągrowiec
- Gmina: Wągrowiec

Ostrowo-Młyn [ɔsˈtrɔvɔ ˈmwɨn] is a settlement in the administrative district of Gmina Wągrowiec, within Wągrowiec County, Greater Poland Voivodeship, in west-central Poland.
