= Kopaszyn =

Kopaszyn may refer to the following places in Poland:

- Kopaszyn, Lower Silesian Voivodeship (south-west Poland)
- Kopaszyn, Greater Poland Voivodeship (west-central Poland)
