= Dębina, Wągrowiec County =

Dębina
- Settlement
- Location within Poland
- Coordinates: 52°48′04″N 17°08′06″E
- Country: Poland
- Voivodeship: Greater Poland
- County: Wągrowiec
- Gmina: Wągrowiec

Dębina [dɛmˈbina] is a settlement in the administrative district of Gmina Wągrowiec, within Wągrowiec County, Greater Poland Voivodeship, in west-central Poland.
