= Łęgowo =

Łęgowo may refer to the following places:

- Łęgowo, Greater Poland Voivodeship (west-central Poland)
- Łęgowo, Strzelce-Drezdenko County in Lubusz Voivodeship (west Poland)
- Łęgowo, Zielona Góra County in Lubusz Voivodeship (west Poland)
- Łęgowo, Pomeranian Voivodeship (north Poland)
- Łęgowo, Iława County in Warmian-Masurian Voivodeship (north Poland)
- Łęgowo, Olecko County in Warmian-Masurian Voivodeship (north Poland)
