= Jaroszewo Drugie =

- Village
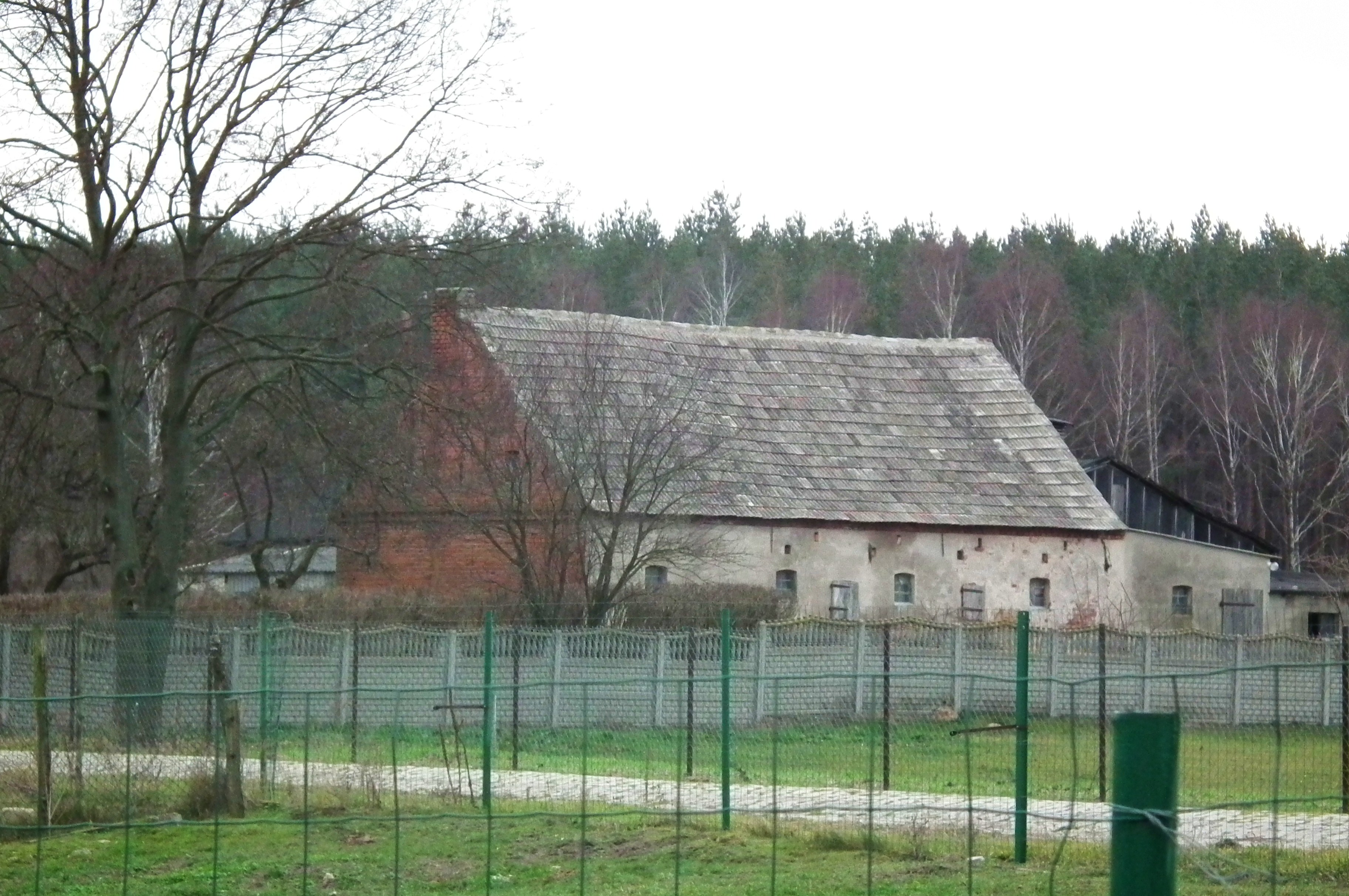

- Location within Poland
- Coordinates: 52°41′18″N 17°20′20″E
- Country: Poland
- Voivodeship: Greater Poland
- County: Wągrowiec
- Gmina: Mieścisko

Jaroszewo Drugie [jarɔˈʂɛvɔ ˈdruɡʲɛ] is a village in the administrative district of Gmina Mieścisko, within Wągrowiec County, Greater Poland Voivodeship, in west-central Poland.
