= Micharzewo =

- Village
- Location within Poland
- Coordinates: 52°50′19″N 17°14′47″E
- Country: Poland
- Voivodeship: Greater Poland
- County: Wągrowiec
- Gmina: Wągrowiec
- Population: 220

Micharzewo [mixaˈʐɛvɔ] is a village in the administrative district of Gmina Wągrowiec, within Wągrowiec County, Greater Poland Voivodeship, in west-central Poland.
