= Rudniczyn =

- Village
- Location within Poland
- Coordinates: 52°48′N 17°6′E
- Country: Poland
- Voivodeship: Greater Poland
- County: Wągrowiec
- Gmina: Wągrowiec

Rudniczyn [rudˈnit͡ʂɨn] is a village in the administrative district of Gmina Wągrowiec, within Wągrowiec County, Greater Poland Voivodeship, in west-central Poland.
