= Zbietka =

- Village
- Location within Poland
- Coordinates: 52°45′N 17°17′E
- Country: Poland
- Voivodeship: Greater Poland
- County: Wągrowiec
- Gmina: Mieścisko

Zbietka [ˈzbjɛtka] is a village in the administrative district of Gmina Mieścisko, within Wągrowiec County, Greater Poland Voivodeship, in west-central Poland.
