= Tarnowo Pałuckie =

- Village
- Location within Poland
- Coordinates: 52°49′N 17°16′E
- Country: Poland
- Voivodeship: Greater Poland
- County: Wągrowiec
- Gmina: Wągrowiec
- Population: 150

Tarnowo Pałuckie [tarˈnɔvɔ paˈwut͡skʲɛ] is a village in the administrative district of Gmina Wągrowiec, within Wągrowiec County, Greater Poland Voivodeship, in west-central Poland.

The village has a 14th-century wooden church.
