= Koźlanka =

- Settlement
- Location within Poland
- Coordinates: 52°45′1″N 17°18′24″E
- Country: Poland
- Voivodeship: Greater Poland
- County: Wągrowiec
- Gmina: Wągrowiec

Koźlanka [kɔˈʑlanka] is a settlement in the administrative district of Gmina Wągrowiec, within Wągrowiec County, Greater Poland Voivodeship, in west-central Poland.
