= Józefowo, Wągrowiec County =

Józefowo
- Village
- Location within Poland
- Coordinates: 52°49′05″N 17°03′33″E
- Country: Poland
- Voivodeship: Greater Poland
- County: Wągrowiec
- Gmina: Wągrowiec

Józefowo (Polish: [juzɛˈfɔvɔ]; German: Josephowo, 1939–45 Grünfließ) is a village in the administrative district of Gmina Wągrowiec, within Wągrowiec County, Greater Poland Voivodeship, in west-central Poland.
