= Podlesie Kościelne =

- Village
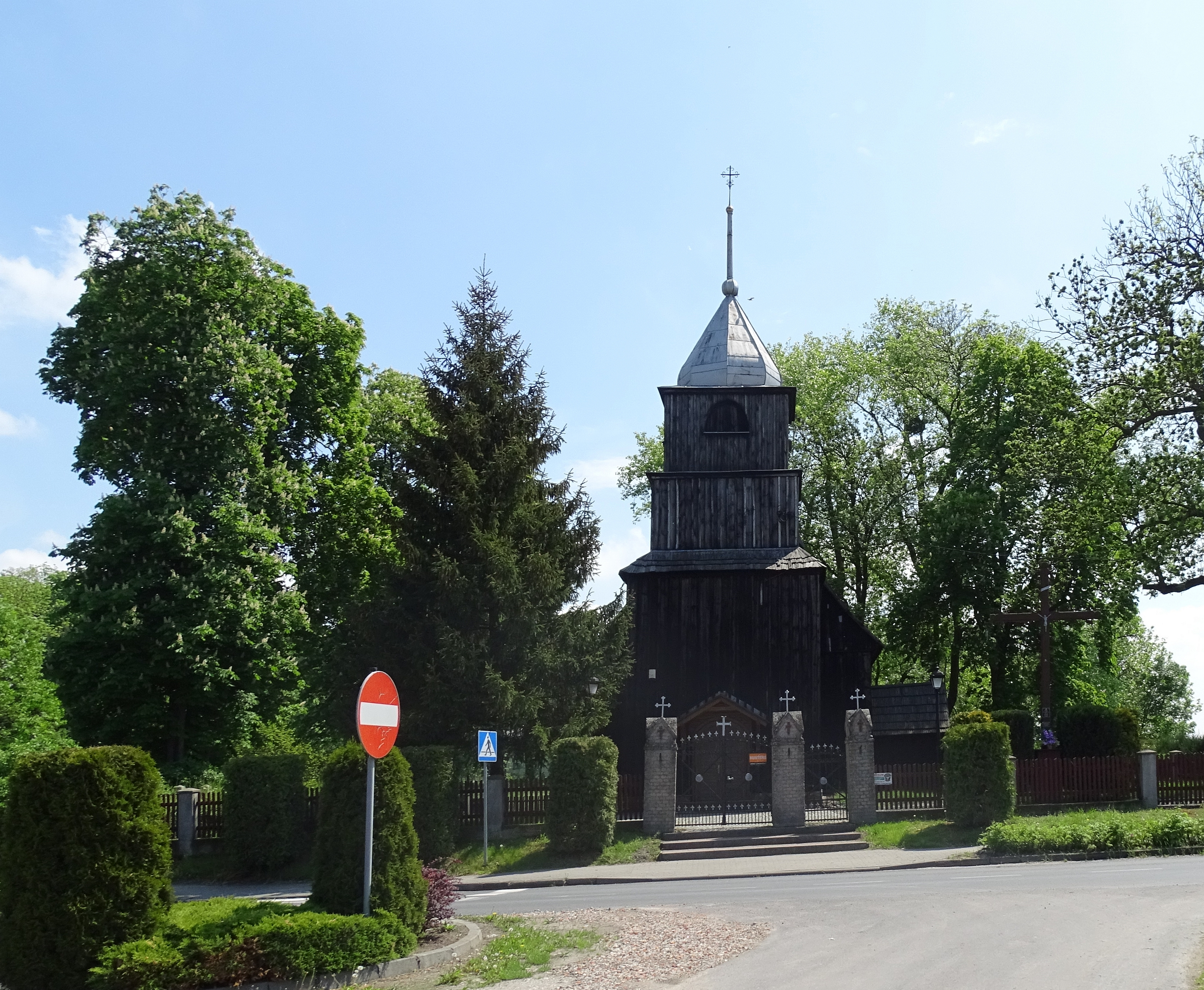
- Historic wooden church of Saint Anne in Podlesie Kościelne

- Location within Poland
- Coordinates: 52°44′N 17°18′E
- Country: Poland
- Voivodeship: Greater Poland
- County: Wągrowiec
- Gmina: Mieścisko
- Time zone: UTC+1 (CET)
  - Summer (DST): UTC+2 (CEST)

Podlesie Kościelne [pɔdˈlɛɕɛ kɔɕˈt͡ɕɛlnɛ] is a village in the administrative district of Gmina Mieścisko, within Wągrowiec County, Greater Poland Voivodeship, in west-central Poland.

There is a historic wooden church of Saint Anne from 1712 in the village.

== History ==
Podlesie was a private village of Polish nobility, administratively located in the Gniezno County in the Kalisz Voivodeship in the Greater Poland Province of the Kingdom of Poland.

According to the 1921 census, the village had a population of 52, entirely Polish by nationality and Roman Catholic by confession.

During the German invasion of Poland, in September 1939, the Wehrmacht carried out a massacre of nine Poles in the village.
