= Wiatrowo, Greater Poland Voivodeship =

Wiatrowo
- Village
- Location within Poland
- Coordinates: 52°45′15″N 17°8′19″E
- Country: Poland
- Voivodeship: Greater Poland
- County: Wągrowiec
- Gmina: Wągrowiec
- Population: 575

Wiatrowo [vjaˈtrɔvɔ] is a village in the administrative district of Gmina Wągrowiec, within Wągrowiec County, Greater Poland Voivodeship, in west-central Poland.
