= Grylewo =

- Village
- Location within Poland
- Coordinates: 52°54′N 17°14′E
- Country: Poland
- Voivodeship: Greater Poland
- County: Wągrowiec
- Gmina: Wągrowiec
- Website: http://grylewo.ta.pl/

Grylewo [ɡrɨˈlɛvɔ] is a village in the administrative district of Gmina Wągrowiec, within Wągrowiec County, Greater Poland Voivodeship, in west-central Poland.
