= Jankowo, Wągrowiec County =

Jankowo
- Settlement
- Location within Poland
- Coordinates: 52°47′23″N 17°12′45″E
- Country: Poland
- Voivodeship: Greater Poland
- County: Wągrowiec
- Gmina: Wągrowiec

Jankowo [janˈkɔvɔ] is a settlement in the administrative district of Gmina Wągrowiec, within Wągrowiec County, Greater Poland Voivodeship, in west-central Poland.
