= Długa Wieś, Wągrowiec County =

Długa Wieś
- Village
- Location within Poland
- Coordinates: 52°46′N 17°11′E
- Country: Poland
- Voivodeship: Greater Poland
- County: Wągrowiec
- Gmina: Wągrowiec

Długa Wieś [ˈdwuɡa ˈvjɛɕ] is a village in the administrative district of Gmina Wągrowiec, within Wągrowiec County, Greater Poland Voivodeship, in west-central Poland.
