= Sady, Wągrowiec County =

Sady
- Settlement
- Location within Poland
- Coordinates: 52°47′48″N 17°14′11″E
- Country: Poland
- Voivodeship: Greater Poland
- County: Wągrowiec
- Gmina: Wągrowiec

Sady [ˈsadɨ] is a settlement in the administrative district of Gmina Wągrowiec, within Wągrowiec County, Greater Poland Voivodeship, in west-central Poland.
