= Potulice, Wągrowiec County =

Potulice
- Village
- Location within Poland
- Coordinates: 52°48′N 17°2′E
- Country: Poland
- Voivodeship: Greater Poland
- County: Wągrowiec
- Gmina: Wągrowiec

Potulice ([pɔtuˈlit͡sɛ]; German: Potulice, 1939–45 Waldgrund) is a village in the administrative district of Gmina Wągrowiec, within Wągrowiec County, Greater Poland Voivodeship, in west-central Poland.
