= Ochodza, Wągrowiec County =

Ochodza
- Village
- Location within Poland
- Coordinates: 52°46′N 17°14′E
- Country: Poland
- Voivodeship: Greater Poland
- County: Wągrowiec
- Gmina: Wągrowiec

Ochodza [ɔˈxɔd͡za] is a village in the administrative district of Gmina Wągrowiec, within Wągrowiec County, Greater Poland Voivodeship, in west-central Poland.
