= Bartodzieje, Greater Poland Voivodeship =

Bartodzieje
- Village
- Location within Poland
- Coordinates: 52°50′42″N 17°10′38″E
- Country: Poland
- Voivodeship: Greater Poland
- County: Wągrowiec
- Gmina: Wągrowiec
- Population: 150

Bartodzieje [bartɔˈd͡ʑɛjɛ] is a village in the administrative district of Gmina Wągrowiec, within Wągrowiec County, Greater Poland Voivodeship, in west-central Poland.
