= Pląskowo =

- Village
- Location within Poland
- Coordinates: 52°41′N 17°19′E
- Country: Poland
- Voivodeship: Greater Poland
- County: Wągrowiec
- Gmina: Mieścisko

Pląskowo [plɔ̃sˈkɔvɔ] is a village in the administrative district of Gmina Mieścisko, within Wągrowiec County, Greater Poland Voivodeship, in west-central Poland.
