= Żabiczyn, Greater Poland Voivodeship =

Żabiczyn
- Village
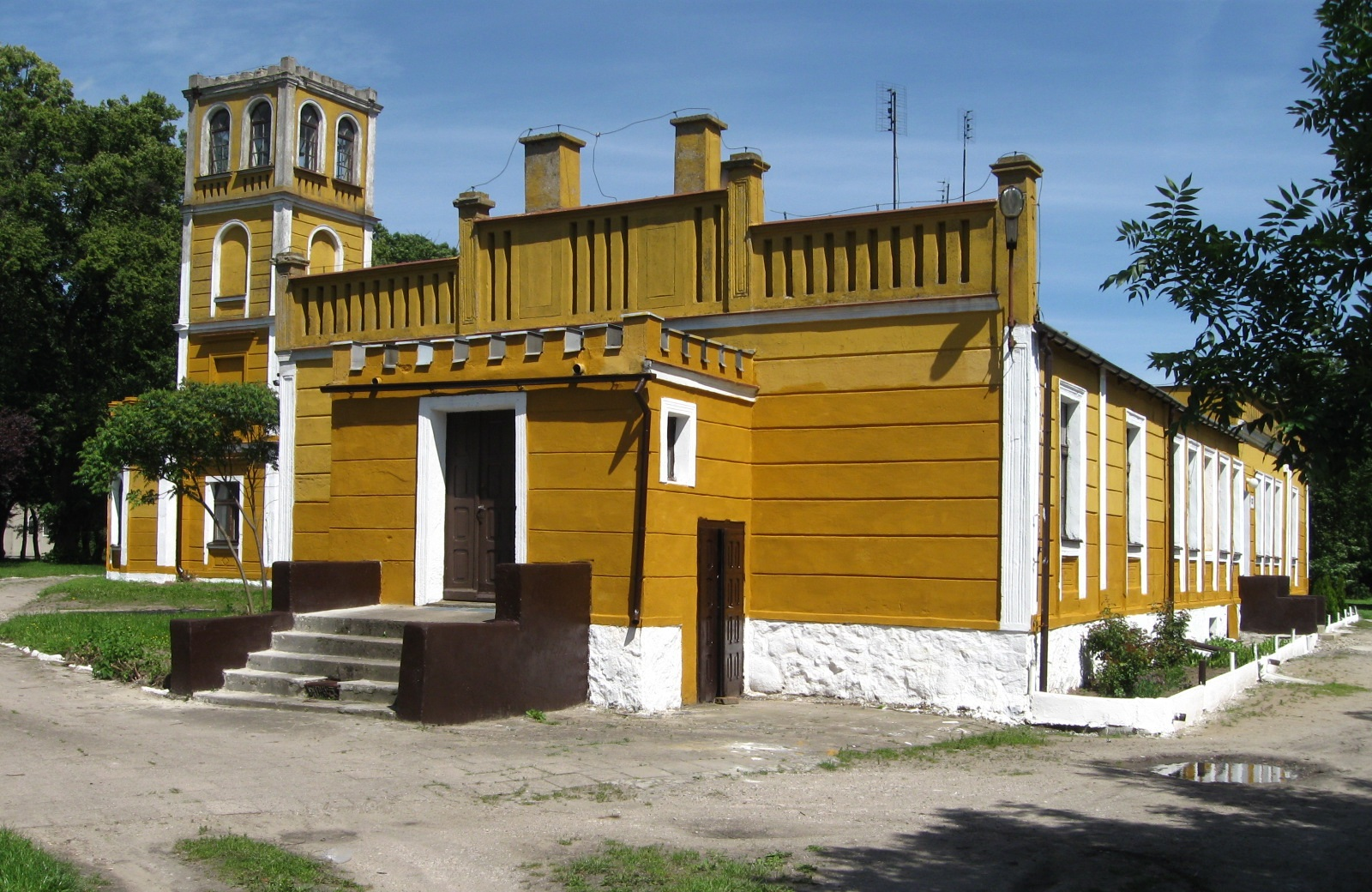

- Location within Poland
- Coordinates: 52°47′09″N 17°21′51″E
- Country: Poland
- Voivodeship: Greater Poland
- County: Wągrowiec
- Gmina: Mieścisko

Żabiczyn [ʐaˈbit͡ʂɨn] is a village in the administrative district of Gmina Mieścisko, within Wągrowiec County, Greater Poland Voivodeship, in west-central Poland.
