= Potuły, Greater Poland Voivodeship =

Potuły
- Village
- Location within Poland
- Coordinates: 52°47′15″N 17°01′00″E
- Country: Poland
- Voivodeship: Greater Poland
- County: Wągrowiec
- Gmina: Wągrowiec

Potuły [pɔˈtuwɨ] is a village in the administrative district of Gmina Wągrowiec, within Wągrowiec County, Greater Poland Voivodeship, in west-central Poland.
