= Mirkowice, Greater Poland Voivodeship =

Mirkowice
- Village
- Location within Poland
- Coordinates: 52°48′N 17°24′E
- Country: Poland
- Voivodeship: Greater Poland
- County: Wągrowiec
- Gmina: Mieścisko

Mirkowice [mirkɔˈvit͡sɛ] is a village in the administrative district of Gmina Mieścisko, within Wągrowiec County, Greater Poland Voivodeship, in west-central Poland.
