= Wiśniewo, Greater Poland Voivodeship =

Wiśniewo
- Village
- Location within Poland
- Coordinates: 52°52′49″N 17°21′52″E
- Country: Poland
- Voivodeship: Greater Poland
- County: Wągrowiec
- Gmina: Wągrowiec

Wiśniewo [viɕˈɲɛvɔ] is a village in the administrative district of Gmina Wągrowiec, within Wągrowiec County, Greater Poland Voivodeship, in west-central Poland.
