= Gołaszewo, Greater Poland Voivodeship =

Gołaszewo
- Village
- Location within Poland
- Coordinates: 52°45′N 17°25′E
- Country: Poland
- Voivodeship: Greater Poland
- County: Wągrowiec
- Gmina: Mieścisko
- Population: 215

Gołaszewo [ɡɔwaˈʂɛvɔ] is a village in the administrative district of Gmina Mieścisko, within Wągrowiec County, Greater Poland Voivodeship, in west-central Poland.

== Gallery ==
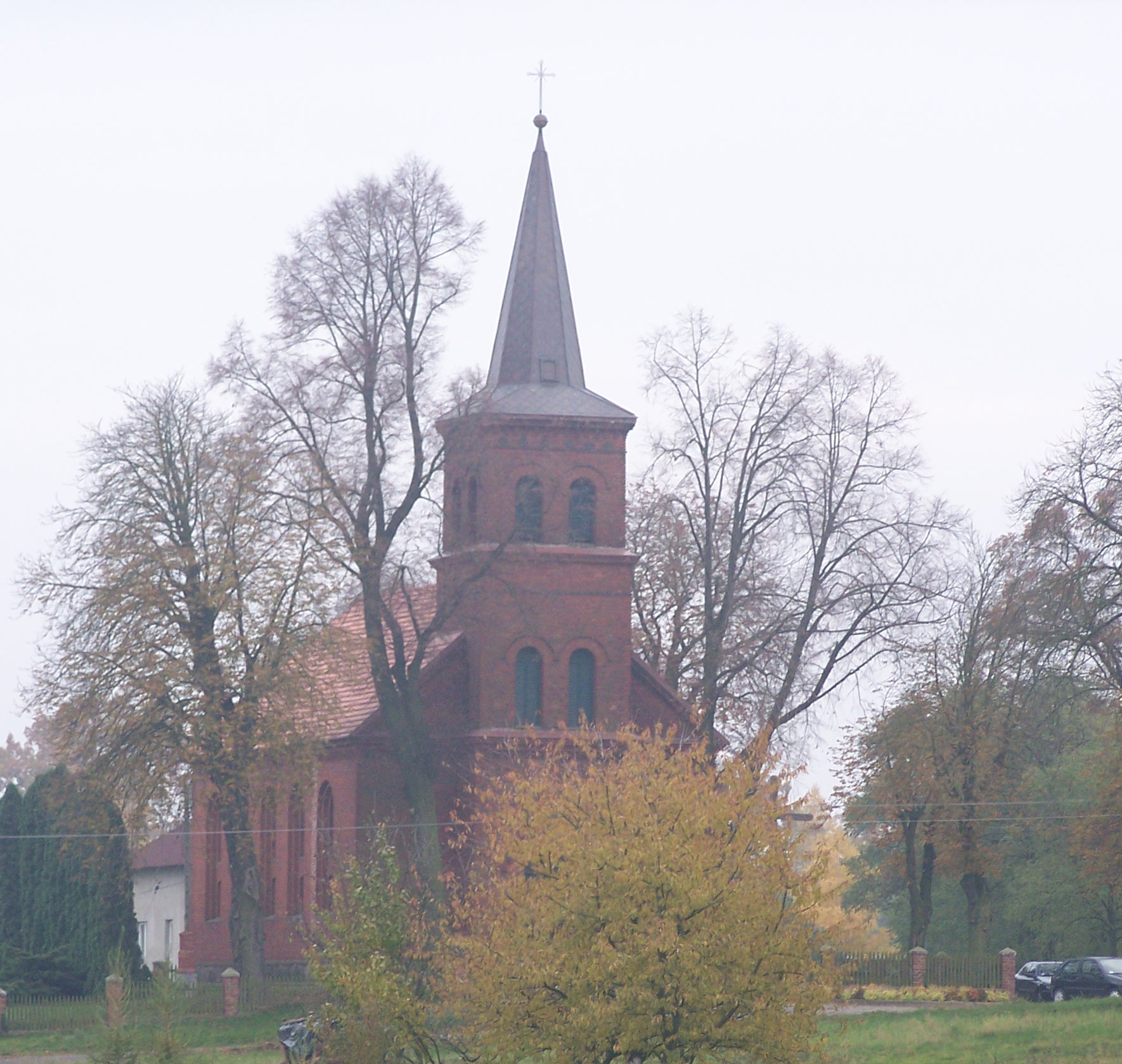
Church of Saint Stanislaus in Gołaszewo
