= Przysieka, Wągrowiec County =

Przysieka
- Village
- Location within Poland
- Coordinates: 52°44′15″N 17°08′49″E
- Country: Poland
- Voivodeship: Greater Poland
- County: Wągrowiec
- Gmina: Wągrowiec

Przysieka [pʂɨˈɕɛka] is a village in the administrative district of Gmina Wągrowiec, within Wągrowiec County, Greater Poland Voivodeship, in west-central Poland.
