= Czekanowo, Greater Poland Voivodeship =

Czekanowo
- Village
- Location within Poland
- Coordinates: 52°45′N 17°9′E
- Country: Poland
- Voivodeship: Greater Poland
- County: Wągrowiec
- Gmina: Wągrowiec
- Population: 116

Czekanowo [t͡ʂɛkaˈnɔvɔ] is a village in the administrative district of Gmina Wągrowiec, within Wągrowiec County, Greater Poland Voivodeship, in west-central Poland.
