= Ludwikowo, Wągrowiec County =

Ludwikowo
- Village
- Location within Poland
- Coordinates: 52°50′12″N 17°20′14″E
- Country: Poland
- Voivodeship: Greater Poland
- County: Wągrowiec
- Gmina: Wągrowiec
- Population: 130

Ludwikowo [ludviˈkɔvɔ] is a village in the administrative district of Gmina Wągrowiec, within Wągrowiec County, Greater Poland Voivodeship, in west-central Poland.
