= Podlesie Wysokie =

- Village
- Location within Poland
- Coordinates: 52°43′20″N 17°14′58″E
- Country: Poland
- Voivodeship: Greater Poland
- County: Wągrowiec
- Gmina: Mieścisko

Podlesie Wysokie [pɔdˈlɛɕɛ vɨˈsɔkʲɛ] is a village in the administrative district of Gmina Mieścisko, within Wągrowiec County, Greater Poland Voivodeship, in west-central Poland.

== History ==
From 1975 to 1998, Podlesie Wysokie was part of the Poznań Voivodeship. Following the 1998 administrative reform, it has been located in the Greater Poland Voivodeship since 1999.
