= Strzeszkowo =

- Settlement
- Location within Poland
- Coordinates: 52°43′N 17°23′E
- Country: Poland
- Voivodeship: Greater Poland
- County: Wągrowiec
- Gmina: Mieścisko

Strzeszkowo [stʂɛʂˈkɔvɔ] is a settlement in the administrative district of Gmina Mieścisko, within Wągrowiec County, Greater Poland Voivodeship, in west-central Poland.
