= Gółka, Greater Poland Voivodeship =

Gółka
- Village
- Location within Poland
- Coordinates: 52°43′03″N 17°25′36″E
- Country: Poland
- Voivodeship: Greater Poland
- County: Wągrowiec
- Gmina: Mieścisko

Gółka [ˈɡuu̯ka] is a village in the administrative district of Gmina Mieścisko, within Wągrowiec County, Greater Poland Voivodeship, in west-central Poland.
