= Popowo-Kolonia =

- Settlement
- Location within Poland
- Coordinates: 52°42′15″N 17°17′04″E
- Country: Poland
- Voivodeship: Greater Poland
- County: Wągrowiec
- Gmina: Mieścisko

Popowo-Kolonia [pɔˈpɔvɔ kɔˈlɔɲa] is a settlement in the administrative district of Gmina Mieścisko, within Wągrowiec County, Greater Poland Voivodeship, in west-central Poland.
