= Pokrzywnica, Wągrowiec County =

Pokrzywnica
- Village
- Location within Poland
- Coordinates: 52°47′17″N 17°08′14″E
- Country: Poland
- Voivodeship: Greater Poland
- County: Wągrowiec
- Gmina: Wągrowiec

Pokrzywnica [pɔkʂɨvˈnit͡sa] is a village in the administrative district of Gmina Wągrowiec, within Wągrowiec County, Greater Poland Voivodeship, in west-central Poland.

== Population ==
As of census 2021, Pokrzywnica has a population of 5,158.
