= Wymysłowo, Wągrowiec County =

Wymysłowo
- Settlement
- Location within Poland
- Coordinates: 52°42′01″N 17°15′10″E
- Country: Poland
- Voivodeship: Greater Poland
- County: Wągrowiec
- Gmina: Mieścisko

Wymysłowo [vɨmɨˈswɔvɔ] is a settlement in the administrative district of Gmina Mieścisko, within Wągrowiec County, Greater Poland Voivodeship, in west-central Poland.
