= Runowo =

Runowo may refer to the following places:

- Runowo, Czarnków-Trzcianka County in Greater Poland Voivodeship (west-central Poland)
- Runowo, Poznań County in Greater Poland Voivodeship (west-central Poland)
- Runowo, Wągrowiec County in Greater Poland Voivodeship (west-central Poland)
- Runowo, Pomeranian Voivodeship (north Poland)
- Runowo, Warmian-Masurian Voivodeship (north Poland)
- Runowo, West Pomeranian Voivodeship (north-west Poland)
