= Simargl =

Deity in East Slavic mythology

Simargl Симарьглъ
- Member of Vladimir's pantheon

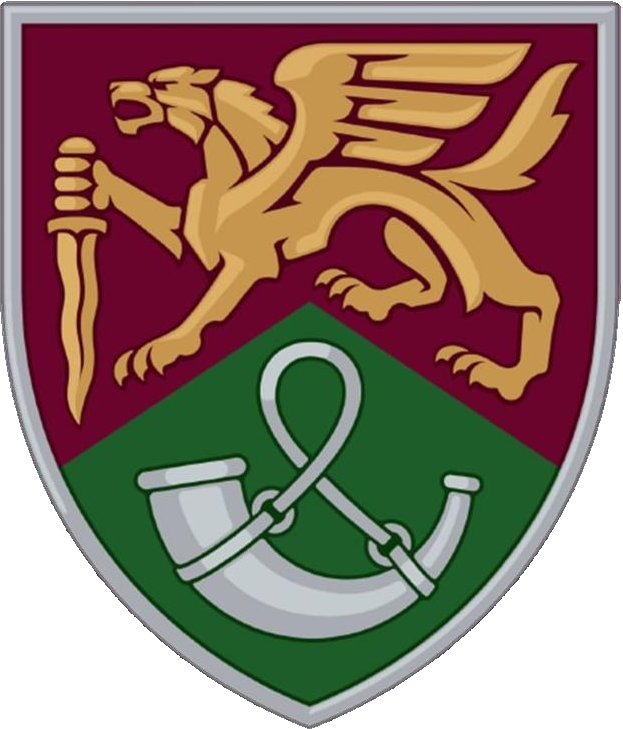
Ukrainian Army's 71st Jaeger Brigade shoulder sleeve patch featuring a Simargl

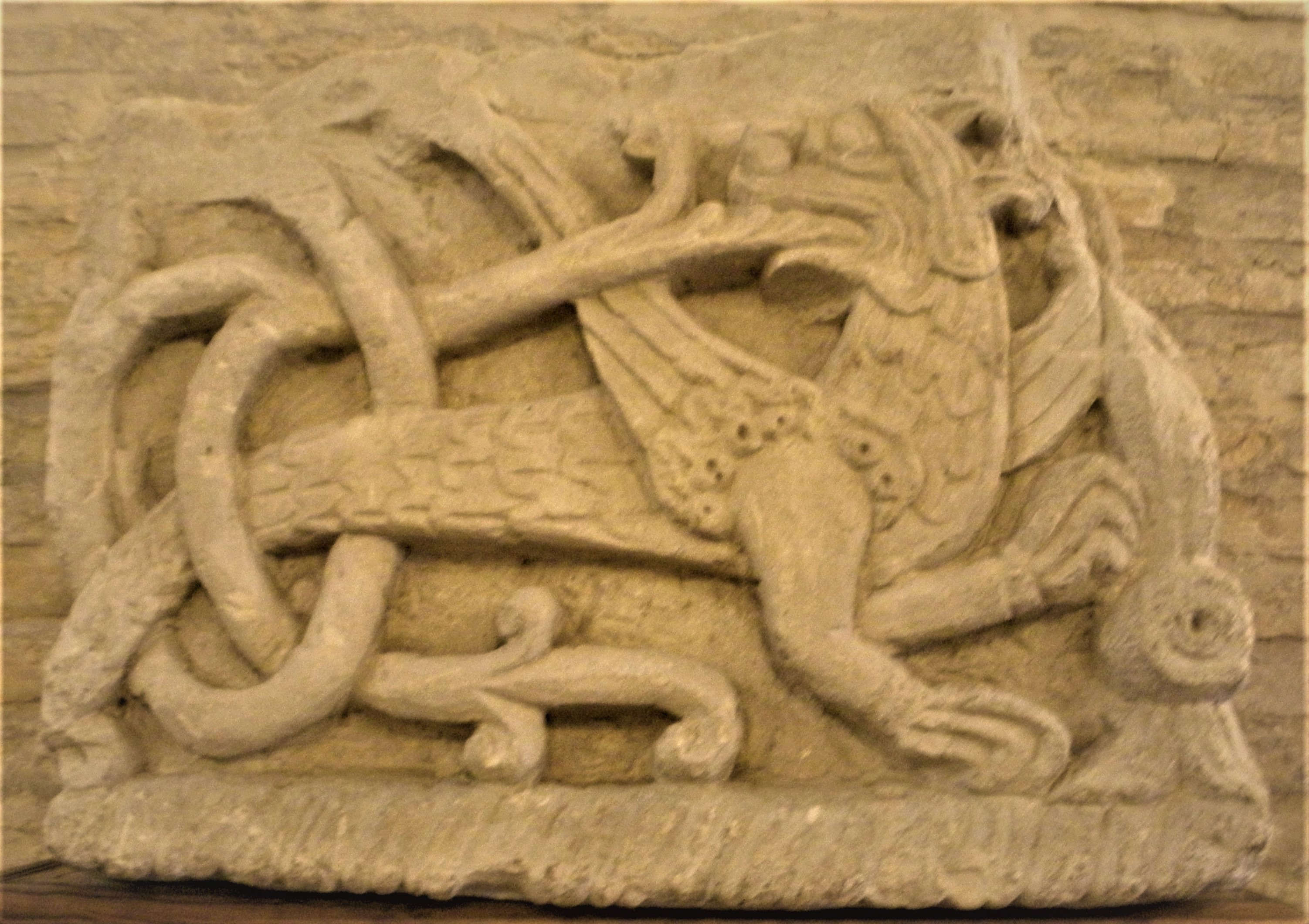
A possible image of Simargl at the Borysohlib Cathedral in Chernihiv

Simargl (also Sěmargl, Semargl) or Sěm and Rgel is an East Slavic god or gods often depicted as a winged dog, mentioned in two sources. The origin and etymology of this/these figure(s) is the subject of considerable debate. The dominant view is to interpret Simargl as a single deity who was borrowed from the Iranian Simurgh. However, this view is criticized, and some researchers propose that the existence of two deities, Sěm and Rgel, should be recognized.

== Sources ==
The first source that mentions Simargl is Primary Chronicle, which describes how Vladimir the Great erected statues to Slavic gods in 980:

And Vladimir began to reign alone in Kyiv. And he placed idols on the hill outside the palace: a Perun in wood with a silver head and a gold moustache, and Khors and Dazhbog and Stribog and Simargl and Mokosh. And they offered sacrifices and called them gods, and they took their sons and daughters to them and sacrificed them to the devils. And they profaned the earth with their sacrifices, and Rus’ and that hill were profaned by blood. But God the merciful, who does not wish the death of sinners, on that hill stands today the church of Saint Vasilij, as we will relate later.

— Primary Chronicle

In a later text from the second half of the 12th century, Sermon by One Who Loves Christ, Simargl is mentioned as two separate deities, Sěm and Rgel:

[...] being unable to bear Christians who live a double faith and believe in Perun and Khors, Mokosh, Sim and Rgl and in the Vily [...]

— Sermon by One Who Loves Christ

The Sermon further states: „Therefore, Christians must not hold demonic festivities, meaning dancing, music and profane songs, and offerings to the idols, who with fire under the fields of sheaves pray to the Vily, to Mokosh, and Sim and Rgl, to Perun, Rod, the Rozhanitsy and all the like.”

== Etymology and interpretations ==
In copies of Primary Chronicle, the theonym is written (in the genitive) as Simarĭgla (Laurentian Codex), Sěmarĭgla (Hypatian Codex) and Semarĭgla (Radziwiłł Chronicle). In the Sermon as two separate theonyms: Sima, Rĭgla (genitive) and Sim(o)u, Rĭgl(o)u (dative).

In 1841, Potr Preys proposed that Sim and Rgel be considered characters corresponding, respectively, to the Old Testament Asima and Nergal. This view was supported by Viljo Mansikka. Alexander Famitsin, on the other hand, concluded that Simargl was a corrupted notation that was originally intended to read Sim Yaryl. Vyacheslav Ivanov and Vladimir Toporov originally concluded that the theonym originally sounded *Sedmor(o)-golvъ and meant "seven-headed".

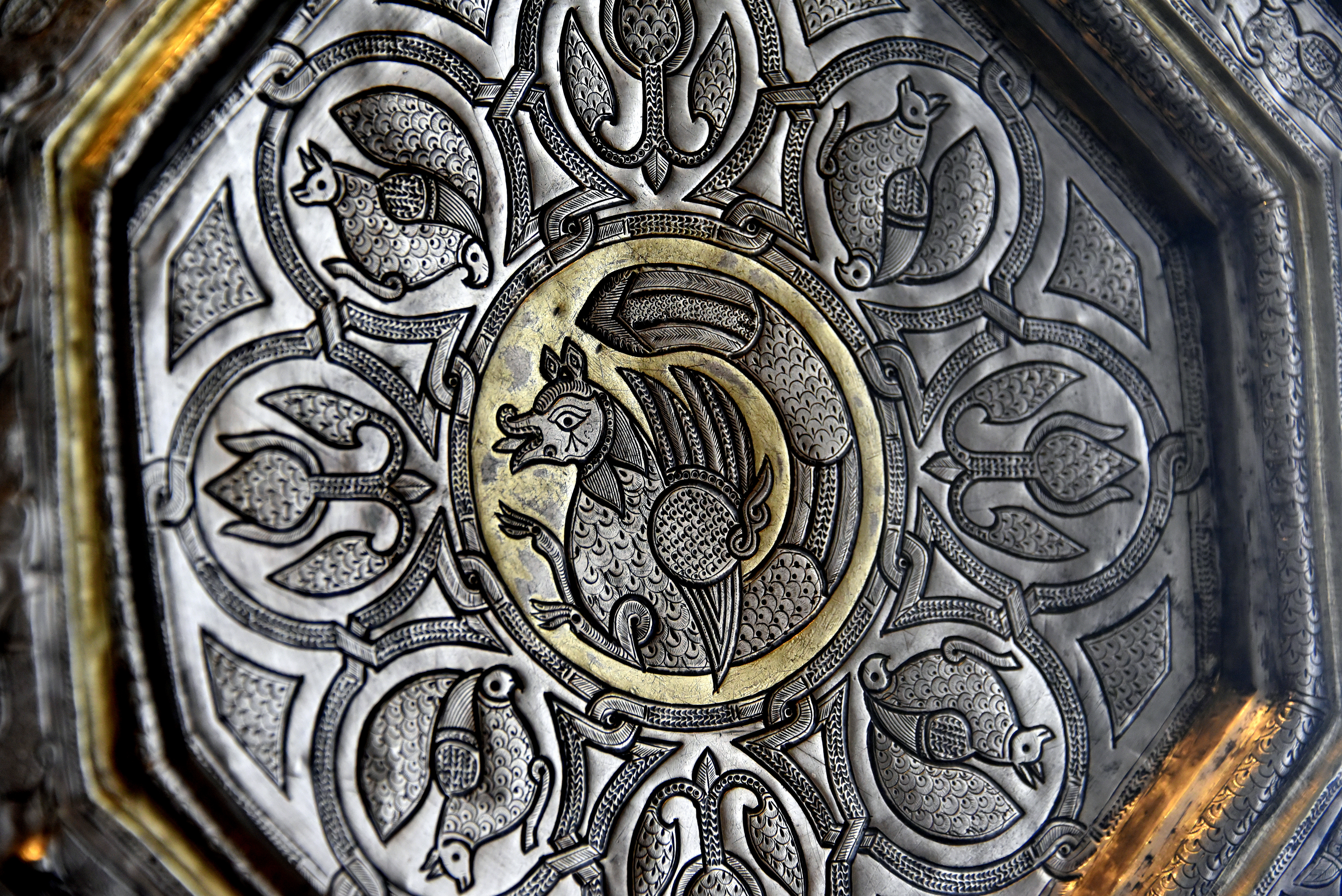
Image of Simurgh on a platter, 9th to 10th century

Since 1933, Simargl has been considered an Iranian loanword. It was first proposed by Kamilla Trever, a Russian historian and orientalist, according to whom the source word for Simargl was supposed to be Simurgh – a winged creature with a dog's head that was a protector of plants. The derivation of Simargl from Simurgh is now the dominant view in scholarship. The source of the borrowing was to be Persian Simurg, Middle Persian Sēnmurw, Avestan saēna-marga or Scythian-Sarmatian Sēnmary.

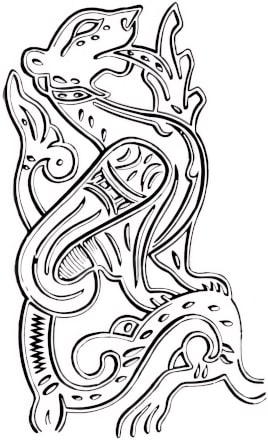
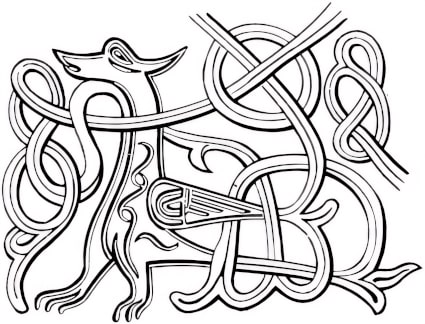
Alleged depictions of Semargl according to Rybakov on a bracelet from Tver

Boris Rybakov was an ardent supporter of the Trever theory; he rejected the division of Simargl into two deities or the possibility of typos. Based on the relationship between Simargl and Simgur, he concluded that Simargl was the god of seeds, sprouts and roots of plants, the protector of shoots and greens, the intermediary between the highest gods of heaven and earth. Simargl was supposed to be a deity of a lower order. He was depicted as a winged dog with fangs and claws, and his images were to be found on various objects, such as bracelets. According to Rybakov, Simargl was identical to Pereplut (often referring to them as Simargl-Pereplut) and was later replaced by him. The view is supported by a number of scholars including Alexander Gieysztor eventually also Ivanov and Toporov and many others.

Mikhail Vasilyev admits that there are some linguistic difficulties in deriving Simargl from Simurgh, but states that it is plausible and accepts the theory, at least until a better one is discovered. However, he questioned Rybakov's interpretation seeing Simargl as a plant god: there are no Iranian or Indian sources confirming that Simurgh was the protector of plants, so Simargl could not have inherited this competence. However, he points out that the common Indo-Iranian characteristic of Simurgh was to mediate between worlds, and that at a later stage, in Eastern Iranian mythology, he was the protector of humans, especially human clusters, and that this may have determined his introduction into the Vladimir's pantheon. He also points out that Simurgh in the form of a dog-bird originated in (post)Sasanian Iran and from there spread to the space between the Atlantic and Siberia. However, after the Islamization of Iran, Simurgh lost its religious significance and became an ornamental motif. According to him, there is no evidence that among the eastern Iranians, from whom the Slavs were supposed to have taken him over, Simurgh was depicted with a dog's head, and this means that he must have had an original appearance, i.e. be depicted as a large, predatory bird, and consequently, Simargl could not have been a dog-bird. As a result, he also accuses Rybakov of arbitrarily concluding that winged dogs in East Slavic art are depictions of Simargl, while an analysis of the oldest depictions of this type (from the 10th century onward) suggests that they may be Old Russian reflections of Western European dragons of the romanesqe type.

The relationship between Simargl and Simurgh has also been criticized on linguistic grounds: the vowels and the last consonant ([l]) do not fit. This has led to at least a dozen other proposals. Martin Pukanec proposed to read the second part of the theonym as Proto-Slavic *orьlъ "eagle". Here he mentions the Latvian cognate ērglis, containing -g-. According to him, this is to prove that -g- was originally in the Balto-Slavic words for eagle, but fell out due to taboo. The Slavs were thus supposed to have borrowed Simurgh as *Sim-orьglъ "eagle Sim" and evolved into *Simo-orьglъ > *Simōrьglъ > *Simarьglъ. This etymology, however, cannot be accepted because Latvian ērglis is a late form and derives from the earlier *ereľis < *erlis and does not correspond to the original forms.

Due to the above mentioned problems, some scholars concluded that Simargl were two separate deities: Sim/Sem/Sěm and Rgel/Rgěl, and it was for them that etymology was sought. Alexander Brückner stated that in the Primary Chronicle the conjunction is also not found between Khors and Dazhbog, and these are still separate theonyms, therefore Simargl should also be divided into two words. According to Martin Pitro and Petr Vokáč, if one considers the existence of two deities instead of one, it is possible that Sěm and Rgel were divine twins, the Slavic counterparts of the Dioskuri.

=== Sěm ===
According to Brückner, Sim's etymology was not problematic. He stated that since there were such words as šeima, šaima, keimas, kaimas in Lithuanian, there could have been a feminine word sima or a masculine sim in Slavic alongside sěmia "family". In doing so, he uncertainly pointed to such place names as Simoradz and Siemiradz.

Krzysztof T. Witczak and Idaliana Kaczor assumed that the basic Old Russian form of the theonym was Sěmъ and that it was etymologically related to Lithuanian Seme-pates, Roman Sēmūnes "deities of sowing", Sabine Simo Sancus Dius Fidius "some deity compared to Hercules", Old Irish Semon "hero or demigod" and Gaulish Σημόνη. ήρωίς "heroine". All these names are supposed to derive ultimately from Proto-Indo-European *Sēmos / *Sēmōn "god of sowing" or *Sēmonā "goddess of sowing". Witczak and Kaczor refer to the PIE root *seh₁- "to sow" > Proto-Slavic *sěti. Michał Łuczyński, however, points out the errors of this etymology: the Latin notation Semepates should be read as the Lithuanian *Žemepatys (from žemė "earth"), while for the rest of the names it is possible to reconstruct the protoform, but it would be *seVmōn-, from the PIE dial. (Italo-Celtic) *seĝʰ-mōn-, from PIE *seĝʰ- "to maintain, care for" and they are not related to Sěm.

Łuczyński, however, agrees with Witczak and Kaczor that the theonym Sěm is etymologically related to the Slavic word for sowing. He reconstructs the Proto-Slavic noun *sêmъ, which consists of the verb *sěti "to sow" and the suffix *-mъ, which literally meant "sowing", secondarily "that what one sows", "that which is sown", etc., from which the theonym is derived.

=== Rgel ===
Brücker proposed two etymologies for Rgel. First one connects Rgel with the alleged Lithuanian god Ruglis or Rugulis; he connected them to, respectively, Old Polish reż and Lithuanian rugys "rye" (Old Polish from PS *rъžь), thus Rgel would be a god of rye, field, economy. The other links Rgel to the Lithuanian god Ruguczis "god of sour things". The Lithuanian theonym is supposed to derive from rugti "to sour", this root in the form rug- also occurs in Slavic languages. Rgel would thus a god associated with the souring. The name of the Polish village of Rgielsko is supposed to derive from the god's name.

Witczak and Kaczor reconstructed the PIE theonym *Rudlós "God of the wild nature" to be attested by the Vedic Rudra and the Old Russian Rgel (from the earlier *Rъdlъ).

Łuczyński notes, however, that none of these etymologies can be accepted because their authors use erroneous notation of the deity when creating the etymology: Brücker gives notations of Rъglъ and Rъgъlъ, and Witczak and Kaczor give Rъglъ (all with ъ – a hard sign), while in the sources it is written as Rьglъ (with ь – a soft sign). Consequently, he also rejects deriving Rgielsko from the name of a god, since then the expected form would be *Rzgielsko (in Polish, the theonym would be *Rzgieł (Slavic rъ > Polish rz)).

According to Łuczyński, the ь in the name may be the result of apophony of e : ь and the only word that fits the theonym is the Proto-Slavic verb *regti "to cut" (cf. Slovene régati "to crack", Polish dial. rzega "streak, weal, welt"), which he derives from the PIE root *h₁regʷ- "to be dark" (cf. Greek érevos "darkness"). The semantic shift from "dark, black" > "empty" is typical (cf. Sanskrit rájas "dark; empty" from the same stem), then the meaning may have shifted to "to make something empty", "to make empty places" > "to make holes, cuts; to cut". The theonym would thus consist of *rьgǫ / *regǫ "I cut" (1st person singular present tense of *regti) and the suffix *-lъ. The resulting participial noun *rьglъ, which later became a theonym, may have meant "that which is cut out" > "cut" > perhaps "chink, fissure", or "hole", "cavity". If this etymology is correct, the name of the Czech municipality Řehlovice may derive from god (from the personal name *Řehl-). According to Łuczyński, Sěm and Rgel were agricultural gods (from the names of agricultural work).

== Bibliography ==
- Alvarez-Pedroza, Juan Antonio (2021). Sources of Slavic Pre-Christian Religion. Leiden: Koninklijke Brill. ISBN 978-90-04-44138-5.
- Brückner, Aleksander (1985). Mitologia słowiańska. Warsaw: Państwowe Wydawnictwo Naukowe. ISBN 8301062452.
- Famitsin, Alexander (1995). Божества древних славян (in Russian) (2 ed.). Petersburg: Алетейя.
- Gieysztor, Aleksander (2006). Mitologia Słowian. Warsaw: Wydawnictwa Uniwersytetu Warszawskiego. ISBN 978-83-235-0234-0.
- Ivanov, Vyacheslav; Toporov, Vladimir (1990). "Семаргл, Симаргл". In Meletinsky, Yeleazar (ed.). Мифологический словарь. Moscow: Большая российская энциклопедия. p. 672.
- Łuczyński, Michał (2020). Bogowie dawnych Słowian. Studium onomastyczne. Kielce: Kieleckie Towarzystwo Naukowe. ISBN 978-83-60777-83-1.
- Mansikka, Viljo (1922). Die Religion der Ostslaven (in German). Helsinki: Fińska Akademia Nauk.
- Pitro, Martin; Vokáč, Petr (2002). Bohové dávných Slovanů (in Czech). Prague: ISV. ISBN 80-85866-91-9.
- Preys, Potr (1841). "Донесение. Г. министру народного просвещения из Праги от 26 декабря 1840 года" (PDF). Журналъ Министерства народнаго просвѣщения. XXIX. Petersburg: Imperatorskaja Akademia Nauk: 31–52.
- Pukanec, Martin (2012). "Etymológia mena Simarьglъ a niektoré iránske paralely". Slavica Slovaca (in Slovak). 47 (2): 104–107.
- Rybakov, Boris (1981). Язычество древних славян. Moscow: Наука.
- Rybakov, Boris (1987). Язычество древней Руси. Moscow: Наука.
- Trever, Kamilla (1933). "Собака-птица: Сэнмурв и Паскудж". Из истории докапиталистических формаций. Сборник статей к сорокапятилетию научнои деятельности Н. Я. Марра (in Russian). S.N. Bykovsky, F.V. Kiparisov, A.G. Prigogine, M.A. Raphael. (editors). Moscow. pp. 293–329.
- Vasilyev, Mikhail Alexandrovich (2000). Особенности формирования и развития восточнославянского язычества. Moscow.
- Vasilyev, Mikhail Alexandrovich (2017). "Древнерусский теоним Семарьглъ: историко-лингвистические этюды, І–ІІ". Славянский альманах. 1–2. Moscow: Индрик: 187–206. ISSN 2073-5731.
- Witczak, Krzysztof T.; Kaczor, Idaliana (1995). "Linguistic evidence for the Indo-European pantheon". Collectanea Philologica. 2. Łódź: 265–278. ISSN 1733-0319.
