= Rąbczyn, Wągrowiec County =

Rąbczyn
- Village
- Location within Poland
- Coordinates: 52°47′N 17°19′E
- Country: Poland
- Voivodeship: Greater Poland
- County: Wągrowiec
- Gmina: Wągrowiec
- Website: rabczyn.pl.tl

Rąbczyn [ˈrɔmpt͡ʂɨn] is a village in the administrative district of Gmina Wągrowiec, within Wągrowiec County, Greater Poland Voivodeship, in west-central Poland, covering an area of 1.105 km^{2}.
