= Bracholin =

- Village
- Location within Poland
- Coordinates: 52°49′N 17°18′E
- Country: Poland
- Voivodeship: Greater Poland
- County: Wągrowiec
- Gmina: Wągrowiec

Bracholin [braˈxɔlin] is a village in the administrative district of Gmina Wągrowiec, within Wągrowiec County, Greater Poland Voivodeship, in west-central Poland.

In 1216 Światosław (from the Pałuki family), comes, bequeathed Bracholin to the closter in Łekno.
