= Kłodzin =

Kłodzin may refer to the following places:

- Kłodzin, Greater Poland Voivodeship (west-central Poland)
- Kłodzin, Warmian-Masurian Voivodeship (north Poland)
- Kłodzin, West Pomeranian Voivodeship (north-west Poland)
