= Budziejewo =

- Village
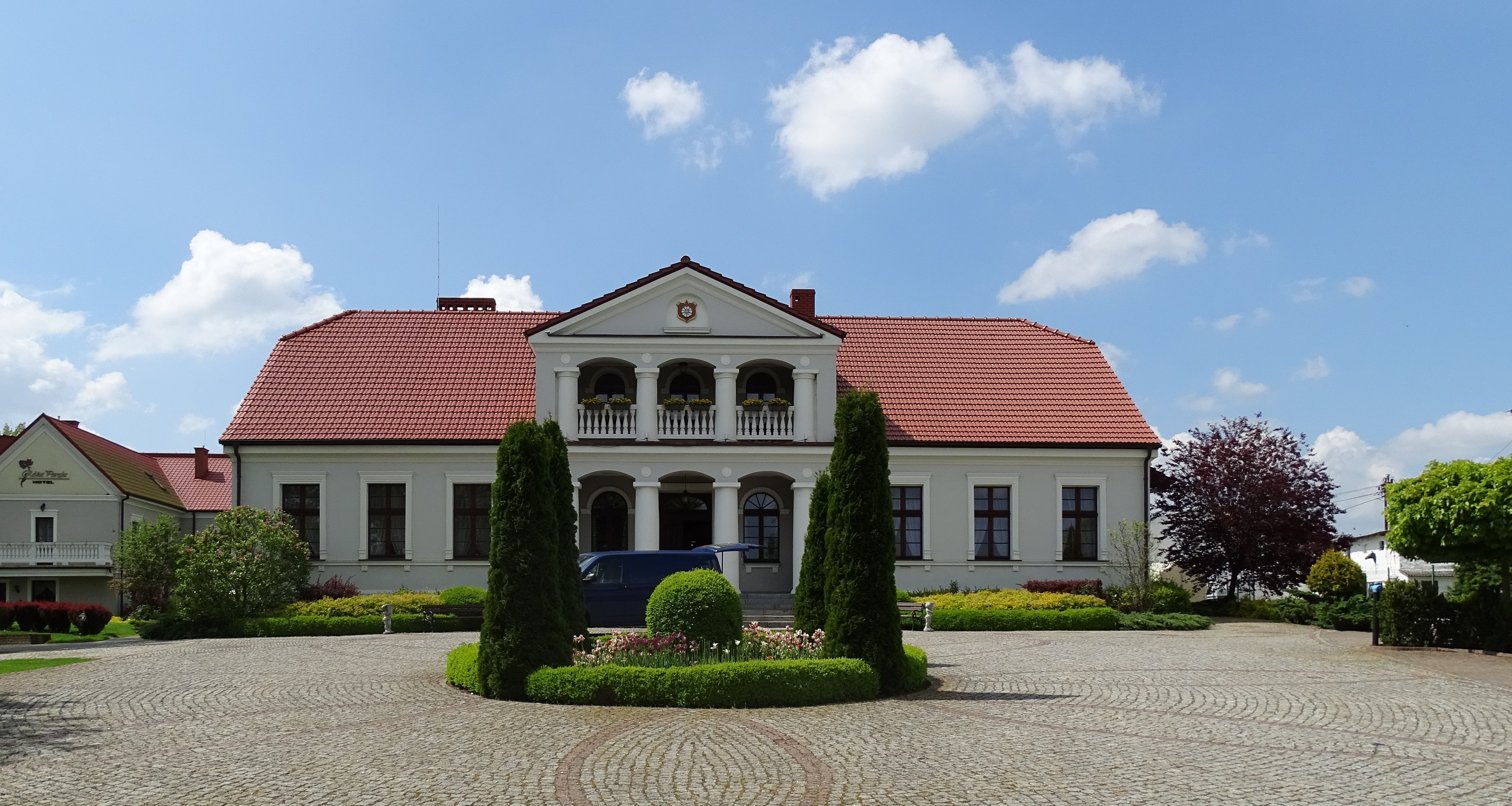
- The manor house from 1856

- Location within Poland
- Coordinates: 52°43′12″N 17°18′04″E
- Country: Poland
- Voivodeship: Greater Poland
- County: Wągrowiec
- Gmina: Mieścisko

Budziejewo [bud͡ʑɛˈjɛvɔ] is a village in the administrative district of Gmina Mieścisko, within Wągrowiec County, Greater Poland Voivodeship, in west-central Poland.
