= Miłosławice =

Miłosławice may refer to the following places in Poland:

- Miłosławice, Lower Silesian Voivodeship (south-west Poland)
- Miłosławice, Greater Poland Voivodeship (west-central Poland)
