= Runowskie =

- Village
- Location within Poland
- Coordinates: 52°47′40″N 17°05′13″E
- Country: Poland
- Voivodeship: Greater Poland
- County: Wągrowiec
- Gmina: Wągrowiec

Runowskie [ruˈnɔfskʲɛ] is a village in the administrative district of Gmina Wągrowiec, within Wągrowiec County, Greater Poland Voivodeship, in west-central Poland.
