= Kaliszany, Greater Poland Voivodeship =

Kaliszany
- Village
- Location within Poland
- Coordinates: 52°53′59″N 17°9′21″E
- Country: Poland
- Voivodeship: Greater Poland
- County: Wągrowiec
- Gmina: Wągrowiec
- Population: 260

Kaliszany [kaliˈʂanɨ] is a village in the administrative district of Gmina Wągrowiec, within Wągrowiec County, Greater Poland Voivodeship, in west-central Poland.
