= Budziejewko =

- Village
- Location within Poland
- Coordinates: 52°43′38″N 17°19′17″E
- Country: Poland
- Voivodeship: Greater Poland
- County: Wągrowiec
- Gmina: Mieścisko

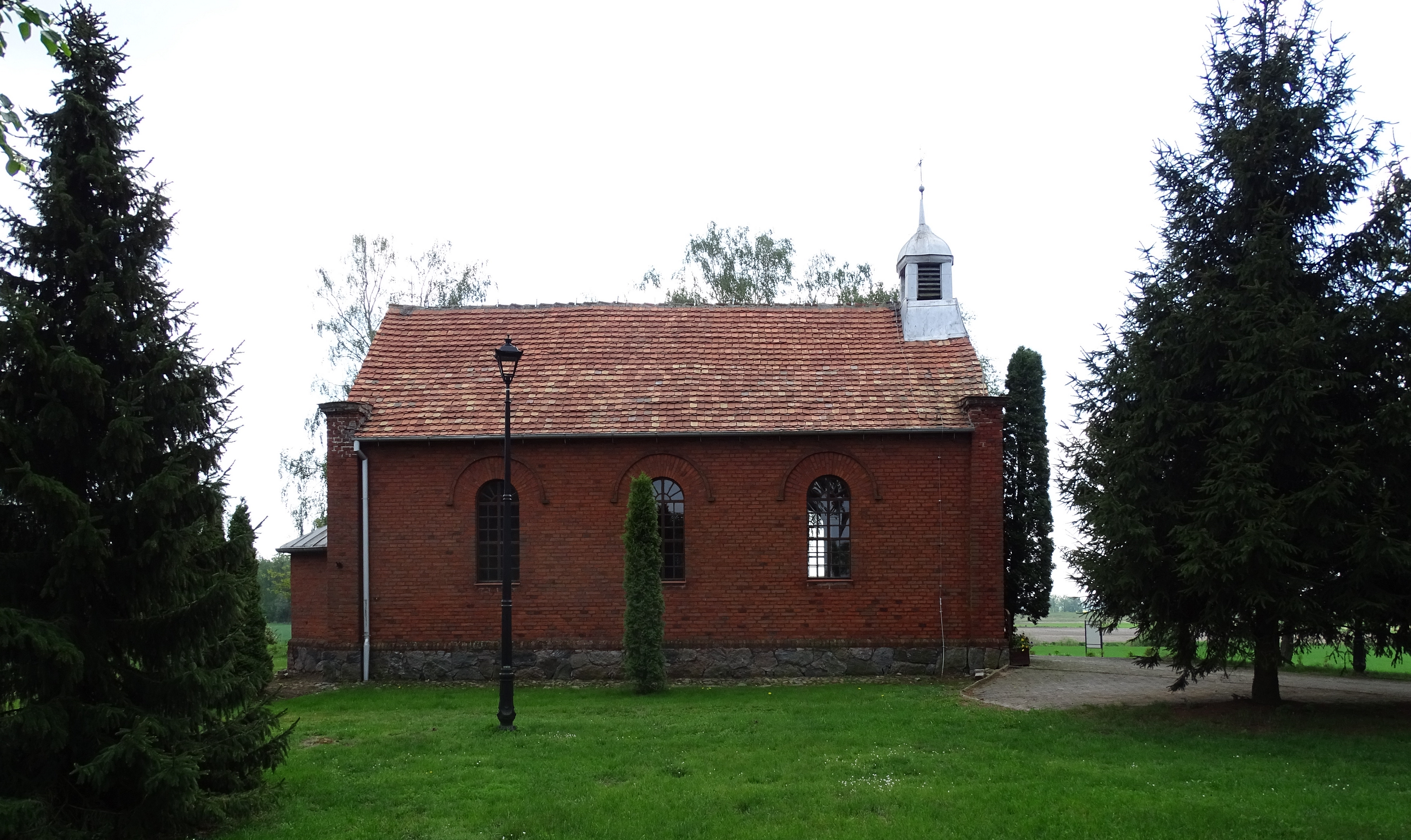
Church of Saint Adalbert from 1858.

Budziejewko [bud͡ʑɛˈjɛfkɔ] is a village in the administrative district of Gmina Mieścisko, within Wągrowiec County, Greater Poland Voivodeship, in west-central Poland.
