= Kobylec, Greater Poland Voivodeship =

Kobylec
- Village
- Location within Poland
- Coordinates: 52°51′N 17°12′E
- Country: Poland
- Voivodeship: Greater Poland
- County: Wągrowiec
- Gmina: Wągrowiec
- Population: 826

Kobylec [kɔˈbɨlɛt͡s] is a village in the administrative district of Gmina Wągrowiec, within Wągrowiec County, Greater Poland Voivodeship, in west-central Poland.
