= Popowo-Huby =

- Settlement
- Location within Poland
- Coordinates: 52°43′23″N 17°16′50″E
- Country: Poland
- Voivodeship: Greater Poland
- County: Wągrowiec
- Gmina: Mieścisko

Popowo-Huby [pɔˈpɔvɔ ˈxubɨ] is a settlement in the administrative district of Gmina Mieścisko, within Wągrowiec County, Greater Poland Voivodeship, in west-central Poland.
