= Żelazka =

- Village
- Location within Poland
- Coordinates: 52°46′39″N 17°08′31″E
- Country: Poland
- Voivodeship: Greater Poland
- County: Wągrowiec
- Gmina: Wągrowiec

Żelazka [ʐɛˈlaska] is a village in the administrative district of Gmina Wągrowiec, within Wągrowiec County, Greater Poland Voivodeship, in west-central Poland.
