= Łekno, Greater Poland Voivodeship =

Łekno
- Village
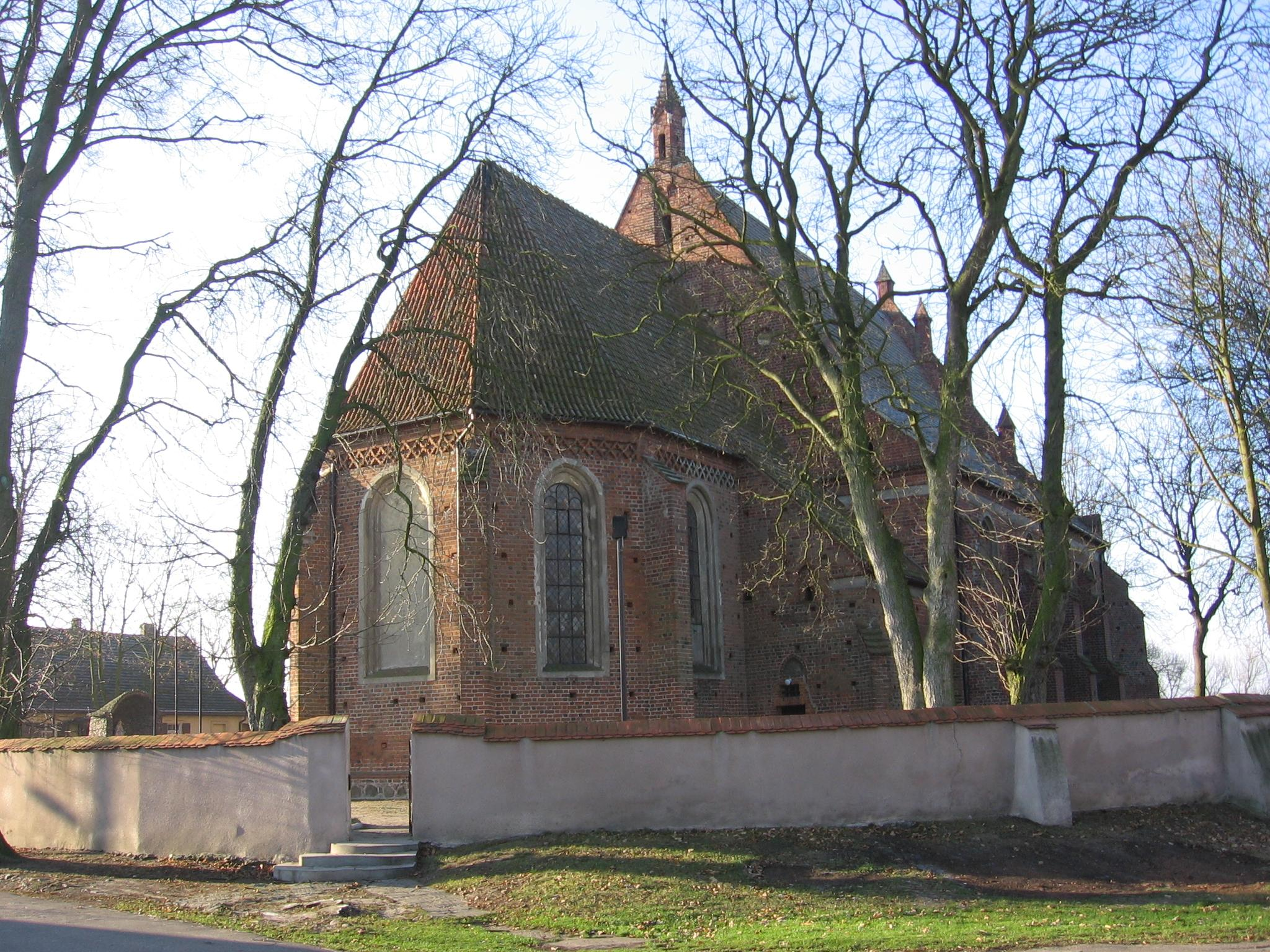
- Church of Saints Peter and Paul

- Location within Poland
- Coordinates: 52°50′22″N 17°18′19″E
- Country: Poland
- Voivodeship: Greater Poland
- County: Wągrowiec
- Gmina: Wągrowiec

Population
  - Total: 630

Łekno [ˈwɛknɔ] is a village in the administrative district of Gmina Wągrowiec, within Wągrowiec County, Greater Poland Voivodeship, in west-central Poland.
