= Pereplut =

Deity in Slavic mythology

Pereplut is a Slavic deity or a demon with an unclear function. It appears in the list of gods and demons of the 12th-century Ruthenian interpolation of the Word of St. Grigory (the manuscript itself dates from the 15th century), as well as in the Word of St. John. According to the source account, pagan Slavs worshiped :

Vila, Mokosh, Dziwa, Perun, Khors, Rod and Rozhanitsy, ghosts and banks, and Pereplut, and turning to drink to him in the corners

— The word of St. John

Pereplut's name may have been distorted when copying the manuscript. The mentioned spinning and drinking are probably traces of magical rituals with elements of dance and libation. Alexei Sobolewski corrected the words in the horns (v rožech) on porohach (porožech), considering Pereplut to be a demon ensuring prosperity when crossing river thresholds, hence his possible identification as a water deity, with the etymology of the words pere- "through" and pluti-"to flow". This etymology was adopted by Stanisław Urbańczyk, who reconstructed the theonym in the form of Pereput. Boris Rybakov considered it a new name variation of archaic deity Simargl.
