= Gmina Mieścisko =

Gmina Mieścisko Mieścisko Commune
- Gmina
- Flag Coat of arms
- Interactive map of Gmina Mieścisko
- Coordinates (Mieścisko): 52°44′36″N 17°19′54″E
- Country: Poland
- Voivodeship: Greater Poland
- County: Wągrowiec
- Seat: Mieścisko

Area
  - Total: 135.62 km^{2} (52.36 sq mi)

Population (2008)
  - Total: 5,942
  - Density: 43.81/km^{2} (113.5/sq mi)
- Website: http://www.miescisko.nowoczesnagmina.pl/

Gmina Mieścisko is a rural gmina (administrative district) in Wągrowiec County, Greater Poland Voivodeship, in west-central Poland. Its seat is the village of Mieścisko, which lies approximately 11 kilometres (7 mi) south-east of Wągrowiec and 48 km (30 mi) north-east of the regional capital Poznań.

The gmina covers an area of 135.62 square kilometres (52.4 sq mi), and as of June 2008, its total population is 5,942.

== Villages ==
Gmina Mieścisko contains the villages and settlements of Budziejewko, Budziejewo, Gołaszewo, Gółka, Gorzewo, Jaroszewo Drugie, Jaroszewo Pierwsze, Jaworówko, Kłodzin, Mieścisko, Miłosławice, Mirkowice, Mirkowiczki, Nieświastowice, Piastowice, Pląskowo, Podlesie Kościelne, Podlesie Wysokie, Popowo Kościelne, Popowo-Huby, Popowo-Kolonia, Sarbia, Strzeszkowo, Wiela, Wybranówko, Wymysłowo, Żabiczyn, Zakrzewo and Zbietka.

== Neighbouring gminas ==
Gmina Mieścisko is bordered by the gminas of Damasławek, Janowiec Wielkopolski, Kłecko, Mieleszyn, Skoki and Wągrowiec.
