= Mieścisko, Greater Poland Voivodeship =

Mieścisko
- Town
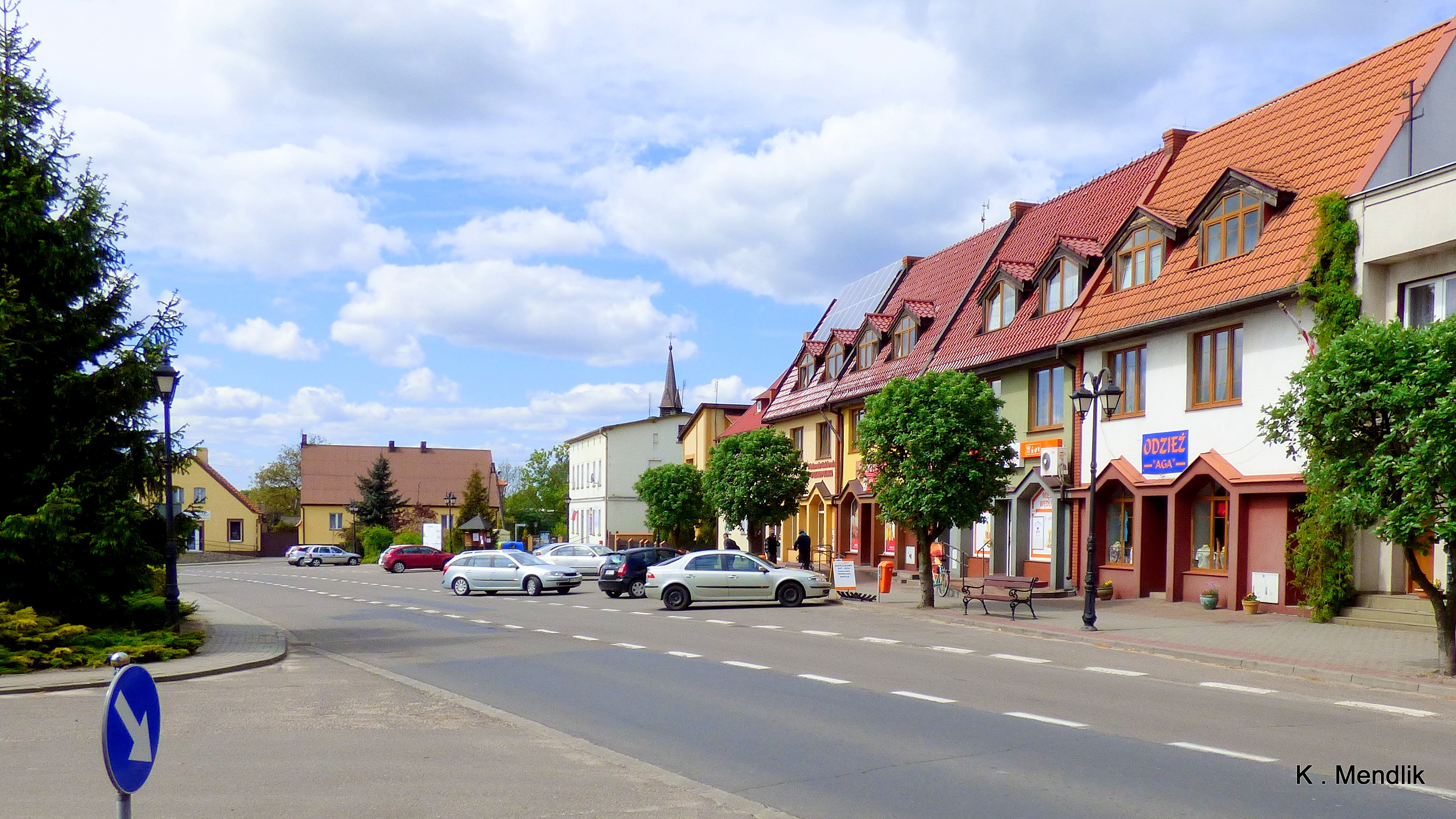

- Flag Coat of arms

- Location within Poland
- Coordinates: 52°44′36″N 17°19′54″E
- Country: Poland
- Voivodeship: Greater Poland
- County: Wągrowiec
- Gmina: Mieścisko

Population
  - Total: 2,500
- Time zone: UTC+1 (CET)
  - Summer (DST): UTC+2 (CEST)
- Vehicle registration: PWA
- Website: http://www.miescisko.nowoczesnagmina.pl/

Mieścisko [mjɛɕˈt͡ɕiskɔ] is a town in Wągrowiec County, Greater Poland Voivodeship, in west-central Poland. It is the seat of the gmina (administrative district) called Gmina Mieścisko. It is situated on the Wełna River.

== History ==
Mieścisko was a royal town of Poland, administratively located in the Gniezno County in the Kalisz Voivodeship in the Greater Poland Province of the Kingdom of Poland. It was historically known both as Mieścisko and Nowe Miasto. The residents were mainly engaged in farming, cattle breeding and trade.

Following the joint German-Soviet invasion of Poland, which started World War II in September 1939, Mieścisko was occupied by Germany until 1945. Local Poles were among the victims of massacres committed by the occupiers in 1939 in Kłecko and Bukowiec. Several Poles who were either born or lived and worked in Mieścisko were murdered by the Russians in the Katyn massacre in 1940.
