= Bukowiec, Wągrowiec County =

Bukowiec
- Village
- Location within Poland
- Coordinates: 52°52′N 17°16′E
- Country: Poland
- Voivodeship: Greater Poland
- County: Wągrowiec
- Gmina: Wągrowiec
- Time zone: UTC+1 (CET)
  - Summer (DST): UTC+2 (CEST)
- Vehicle registration: PWA

Bukowiec [buˈkɔvjɛt͡s] is a village in the administrative district of Gmina Wągrowiec, within Wągrowiec County, Greater Poland Voivodeship, in west-central Poland.

== History ==
The village was mentioned in a medieval document from 1282, when it was part of Piast-ruled Poland. Bukowiec was a private church village, administratively located in the Kcynia County in the Kalisz Voivodeship in the Greater Poland Province of the Kingdom of Poland.

During the German occupation of Poland (World War II), on 8 December 1939, the Germans carried out a massacre of 107 Poles in the nearby forest. Among the victims were activists, participants of the Greater Poland uprising (1918–19), teachers, students, farmers and merchants from various settlements from the region. In 1944, the Germans burned bodies of the victims in attempt to cover up the crime (see Nazi crimes against the Polish nation).
