= Gmina Wągrowiec =

Gmina Wągrowiec Wągrowiec Commune
- Gmina
- Coat of arms
- Interactive map of Gmina Wągrowiec
- Coordinates (Wągrowiec): 52°48′N 17°12′E
- Country: Poland
- Voivodeship: Greater Poland
- County: Wągrowiec
- Seat: Wągrowiec

Government
  - Mayor: Przemyslaw Majchrzak

Area
  - Total: 347.75 km^{2} (134.27 sq mi)

Population (2006)
  - Total: 11,333
  - Density: 32.590/km^{2} (84.406/sq mi)
- Vehicle registration: PWA
- Website: Official website

Gmina Wągrowiec is a rural gmina (administrative district) in Wągrowiec County, Greater Poland Voivodeship, in west-central Poland. Its seat is the town of Wągrowiec, although the town is not part of the territory of the gmina.

The gmina covers an area of 347.75 square kilometres (134.3 sq mi), and as of 2006 its total population is 11,333.

== Villages ==
Gmina Wągrowiec contains the villages and settlements of Bartodzieje, Bobrowniki, Bracholin, Brzeźno Stare, Bukowiec, Czekanowo, Dąbkowice, Danabórz, Dębina, Długa Wieś, Grylewo, Jakubowo, Jankowo, Józefowo, Kaliska, Kaliszany, Kamienica, Kiedrowo, Kobylec, Kołybiec, Koninek, Kopaszyn, Koźlanka, Krosno, Kurki, Łaziska, Łęgowo, Łekno, Ludwikowo, Łukowo, Micharzewo, Mikołajewo, Nowa Wieś, Nowe, Ochodza, Oporzyn, Orla, Ostrowo-Młyn, Pawłowo Żońskie, Pokrzywnica, Potulice, Potuły, Przysieczyn, Przysieka, Rąbczyn, Redgoszcz, Rgielsko, Rudnicze, Rudniczyn, Runówko, Runowo, Runowskie, Sady, Sarbka, Siedleczko, Sienno, Sieńsko, Tarnowo Pałuckie, Toniszewo, Werkowo, Wiatrowiec, Wiatrowo, Wiśniewo, Żelazka and Żelice.

== Neighbouring gminas ==
Gmina Wągrowiec is bordered by the town of Wągrowiec and by the gminas of Budzyń, Damasławek, Gołańcz, Margonin, Mieścisko, Rogoźno and Skoki.
