= Kłodzin, Greater Poland Voivodeship =

Kłodzin
- Village
- Location within Poland
- Coordinates: 52°42′N 17°23′E
- Country: Poland
- Voivodeship: Greater Poland
- County: Wągrowiec
- Gmina: Mieścisko

Kłodzin [ˈkwɔd͡ʑin] is a village in the administrative district of Gmina Mieścisko, within Wągrowiec County, Greater Poland Voivodeship, in west-central Poland.
