= Rgielsko =

- Village
- Location within Poland
- Coordinates: 52°49′N 17°15′E
- Country: Poland
- Voivodeship: Greater Poland
- County: Wągrowiec
- Gmina: Wągrowiec

Rgielsko [ˈrɡʲɛlskɔ] is a village in the administrative district of Gmina Wągrowiec, within Wągrowiec County, Greater Poland Voivodeship, in west-central Poland.

== History ==
The village, which lies on the shore of a lake of the same name, was first recorded in 1153 as Erglzko, when Zbylut founded the Cistercian monastery at Łekno and granted it Rgielsko together with its lake. Later records give the name as Regliz (1218), Ergilzsko (1222) and Rigielsko (1392). In 1218 Pope Honorius III listed Rgielsko among the monastery's possessions when he took the abbey under papal protection, and in 1222 the Archbishop of Gniezno confirmed the tithes the monastery received from its estates. The village remained the property of the Łekno (later Wągrowiec) monastery until the monastery was dissolved.

In the late 19th century, Rgielsko belonged to Wągrowiec County in the Prussian Province of Posen. The village had 35 houses and 245 inhabitants, while the local estate, renamed Seehausen and owned by the Prussian state, covered about 758 hectares (1,870 acres) and engaged in cattle breeding and butter making. A park dating from the late 19th century is listed in the Polish register of monuments.
