= Wągrowiec County =

Wągrowiec County Powiat wągrowiecki
- County
- Flag Coat of arms

- Location within the voivodeship
- Coordinates (Wągrowiec): 52°48′N 17°12′E
- Country: Poland
- Voivodeship: Greater Poland
- Seat: Wągrowiec
- Gminas: Total 7 (incl. 1 urban): Wągrowiec; Gmina Damasławek; Gmina Gołańcz; Gmina Mieścisko; Gmina Skoki; Gmina Wągrowiec; Gmina Wapno

Area
  - Total: 1,040.8 km^{2} (401.9 sq mi)

Population (2006)
  - Total: 67,606
  - Density: 64.956/km^{2} (168.23/sq mi)
  - Urban: 31,889
  - Rural: 35,717
- Car plates: PWA
- Website: www.wagrowiec.pl

Wągrowiec County (Polish: powiat wągrowiecki) is a unit of territorial administration and local government (powiat) in Greater Poland Voivodeship, west-central Poland. It came into being on January 1, 1999, as a result of the Polish local government reforms passed in 1998. Its administrative seat and largest town is Wągrowiec, which lies 49 kilometres (30 mi) north-east of the regional capital Poznań. The county also contains the towns of Skoki, lying 16 km (10 mi) south of Wągrowiec, and Gołańcz, 18 km (11 mi) north-east of Wągrowiec.

The county covers an area of 1,040.8 square kilometres (401.9 sq mi). As of 2006 its total population is 67,606, out of which the population of Wągrowiec is 24,681, that of Skoki is 3,866, that of Gołańcz is 3,342, and the rural population is 35,717.

== Neighbouring counties ==
Wągrowiec County is bordered by Nakło County to the north-east, Żnin County to the east, Gniezno County to the south-east, Poznań County to the south, Oborniki County to the west, and Chodzież County and Piła County to the north-west.

== Administrative divisions ==
The county is subdivided into seven gminas (one urban, two urban-rural and four rural). These are listed in the following table, in descending order of population.

Gmina	Type	Area (km^{2})	Population (2006)	Seat
Wągrowiec	urban	17.9	24,681	
Gmina Wągrowiec	rural	347.8	11,333	Wągrowiec *
Gmina Skoki	urban-rural	198.5	8,749	Skoki
Gmina Gołańcz	urban-rural	192.1	8,391	Gołańcz
Gmina Mieścisko	rural	135.6	5,887	Mieścisko
Gmina Damasławek	rural	104.7	5,497	Damasławek
Gmina Wapno	rural	44.2	3,068	Wapno
* seat not part of the gmina
