= Modrzewie =

Modrzewie may refer to the following places in Poland:

- Modrzewie, Lower Silesian Voivodeship (south-west Poland)
- Modrzewie, Kuyavian-Pomeranian Voivodeship (north-central Poland)
- Modrzewie, Świętokrzyskie Voivodeship (south-central Poland)
- Modrzewie, Masovian Voivodeship (east-central Poland)
- Modrzewie, Greater Poland Voivodeship (west-central Poland)
- Modrzewie, West Pomeranian Voivodeship (north-west Poland)
