= Turza =

Turza may refer to the following places:

- Turza, Greater Poland Voivodeship (west-central Poland)
- Turza, Lesser Poland Voivodeship (south Poland)
- Turza, Subcarpathian Voivodeship (south-east Poland)
- Turza, Lubliniec County in Silesian Voivodeship (south Poland)
- Turza, Zawiercie County in Silesian Voivodeship (south Poland)
- Turza, Opole Voivodeship (south-west Poland)
- Turza, La Rioja (a village in La Rioja, Spain)
