= Waltersdorf =

Waltersdorf may refer to:

In Austria:

- Bad Waltersdorf, in the Hartberg district, Styria
- Waltersdorf an der March, a part of Drösing, Lower Austria
- Waltersdorf, part of Judenburg, Styria
- Waltersdorf, part of Neukirchen an der Vöckla, Upper Austria
- Waltersdorf, part of Staatz, Lower Austria

In Germany:

- Waltersdorf, Thuringia, in the Saale-Holzland district, Thuringia
- Waltersdorf, Heideblick, a part of Heideblick in the Dahme-Spreewald district, Brandenburg
- Waltersdorf, Schönefeld, a part of Schönefeld in the Dahme-Spreewald district, Brandenburg
- Waltersdorf, Löbau-Zittau, a part of Großschönau in the Löbau-Zittau district, Saxony
- Waltersdorf, Sächsische Schweiz, a part of Porschdorf in the Sächsische Schweiz district, Saxony

In the Czech Republic:

- An older name of Vrchy

In Poland:

- An older name of Mniszków
- An older name of Nielestno
- An older name of Niegosławice, Lubusz Voivodeship in the Silesian Voivodeship

In Romania:

- Waltersdorf, the German name for Dumitrița Commune, Bistriţa-Năsăud County

In Slovakia

- An older name for Rovinka
