= Łazy =

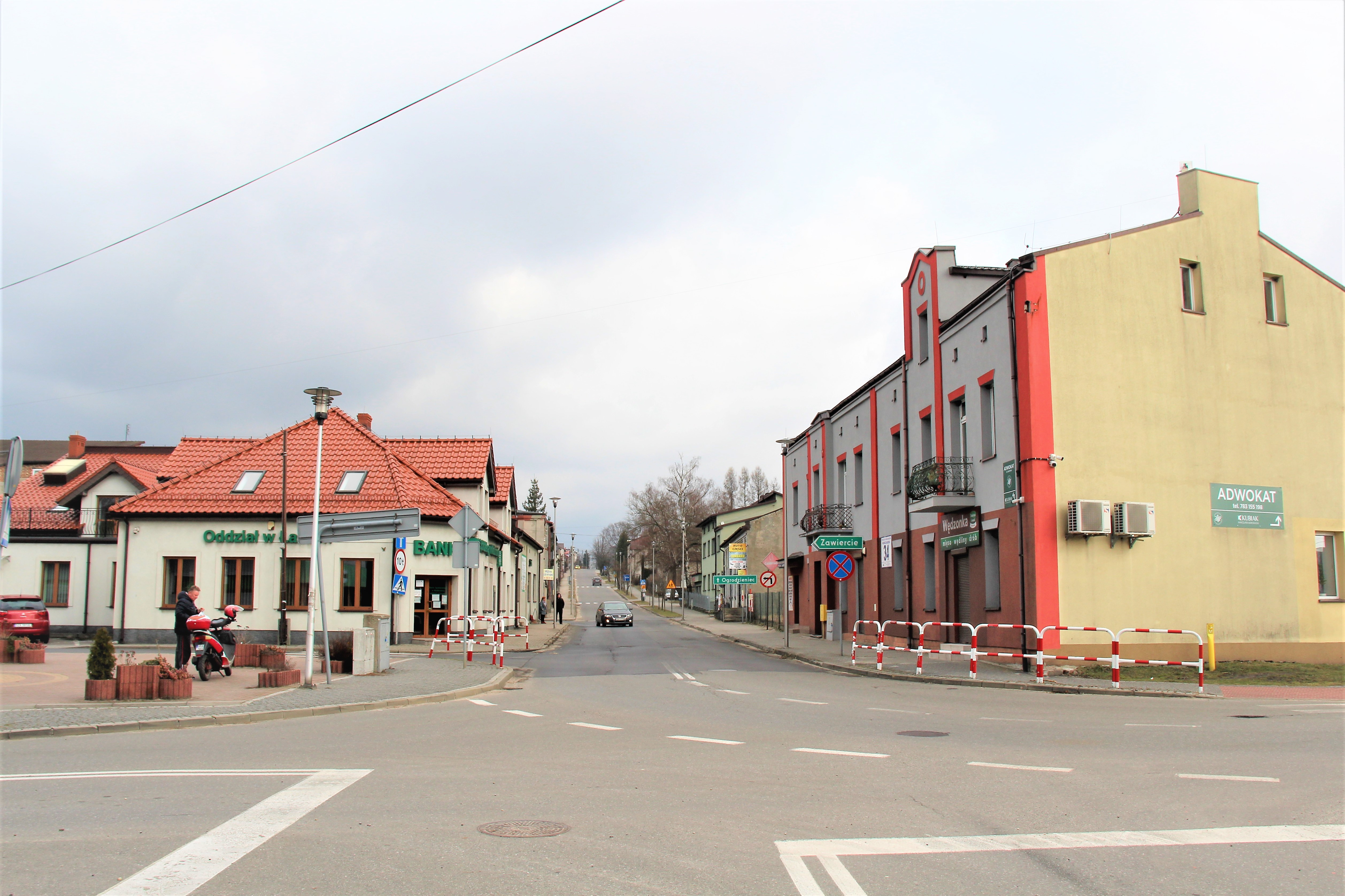
- Town center

- Coat of arms

- Location within Poland
- Coordinates: 50°26′N 19°24′E
- Country: Poland
- Voivodeship: Silesian
- County: Zawiercie
- Gmina: Łazy

Area
  - Total: 8.75 km^{2} (3.38 sq mi)

Population (2019-06-30)
  - Total: 6,811
  - Density: 778/km^{2} (2,020/sq mi)
- Time zone: UTC+1 (CET)
  - Summer (DST): UTC+2 (CEST)
- Postal code: 42–450
- Vehicle registration: SZA
- Website: https://lazy.pl

Łazy [ˈwazɨ] is a town in Zawiercie County, Silesian Voivodeship, in southern Poland. As of 2019, the town has 6,811 inhabitants. Łazy belongs to the historic region of Lesser Poland.

== History ==
In the Middle Ages, in the area of today's Łazy were five settlements: Grabowa, Niegowonice, Wiesiolka, Wysoka and Ciagowice. Another village, which today is located within boundaries of Łazy, Chruszczobrod, belonged to the Duchy of Siewierz, which was incorporated directly into the Polish–Lithuanian Commonwealth in 1790. In the year 1386, King Władysław II Jagiełło granted the villages of Niegowonice, Wiesiolka, Wysoka, Grabowa and Rokitno Szlacheckie to Włodek of Charbinowice, the starosta of Lublin and czesnik of Kraków. Until 1795, Grabowa, Hutki Kanki and Niegowoniczki belonged to Lelów County, while Niegowonice, WiesióΠka, Wysoka, Ciagowice, Rokitno Szlacheckie and Turza were part of Kraków County. During the Swedish invasion of Poland, the area of today's Łazy witnessed heavy fighting and destruction. Stanislaw Warszycki, owner of the so-called Ogrodzieniec Properties, fought Swedish invaders. As a result, the Ogrodzieniec Castle was destroyed, together with numerous villages, such as Grabowa, with its fortified stronghold on the Lesser Poland – Silesian border.

After the Third Partition of Poland (1795), the boundary between the Kingdom of Prussia and the Habsburg Empire was established on the upper Pilica river. The area of Łazy was seized by Prussia, as part of the province of New Silesia. In 1807, after the Treaties of Tilsit, it became part of the short-lived Polish Duchy of Warsaw, and after the duchy's dissolution in 1815 it became part of Russian-controlled Congress Poland, and remained part of Russian Empire until World War I. The village of Łazy for the first time appeared on maps in ca. 1790. It remained a small settlement, located next to the much larger village of Rokitno Szlacheckie. Łazy owes its development to the construction of the Warsaw–Vienna railway (completed in 1848). During the January Uprising, a skirmish between Polish rebels and Russian troops took place near Lazy on March 22, 1863.

Until 1927, Łazy belonged to the gmina of Rokitno Szlacheckie, Będzin County. In the Second Polish Republic, it was originally part of Kielce Voivodeship, and on January 1, 1927, the gmina of Rokitno Szlacheckie was transferred to Zawiercie County.

Łazy was captured by the Wehrmacht at the early stages of World War II in early September 1939, and remained under German occupation until January 20, 1945. German occupiers changed the name to Lazy then to Lasern without a legislative decree. The local Polish police chief was murdered by the Russians in the Katyn massacre in 1940. From 1941 to 1944, the occupiers operated a forced labour camp for Jewish men in Łazy.

After the war, the government of People's Republic of Poland transferred Łazy to Katowice Voivodeship, creating the gmina of Łazy in late 1945. In Communist Poland, Łazy was a local center of industry, with Cement Works Wysoka, Pottery Plant, and large cargo depot of Polish State Railways. In the late 1940s, houses of culture, cinemas and libraries were opened in the gmina of Łazy. Until 1947 the town was the seat of the Rokitno Szlacheckie municipality. The village went through the period of quick development in the 1960s, when waterworks and electrification program were completed. Finally, on January 1, 1967, Łazy received town charter. In the years 1975–1998 the town administratively belonged to the Katowice Voivodeship.

== War cemetery ==
The War Cemetery was founded during 1914–1918. In it are graves of Austrian and German soldiers who fought in World War I. The cemetery is situated in the western part of the town, on the Podlesie estate on the Konstytucja road. In the neighbourhood of the cemetery there is a parish dedicated to Maximilian Kolbe.

== Landmarks ==
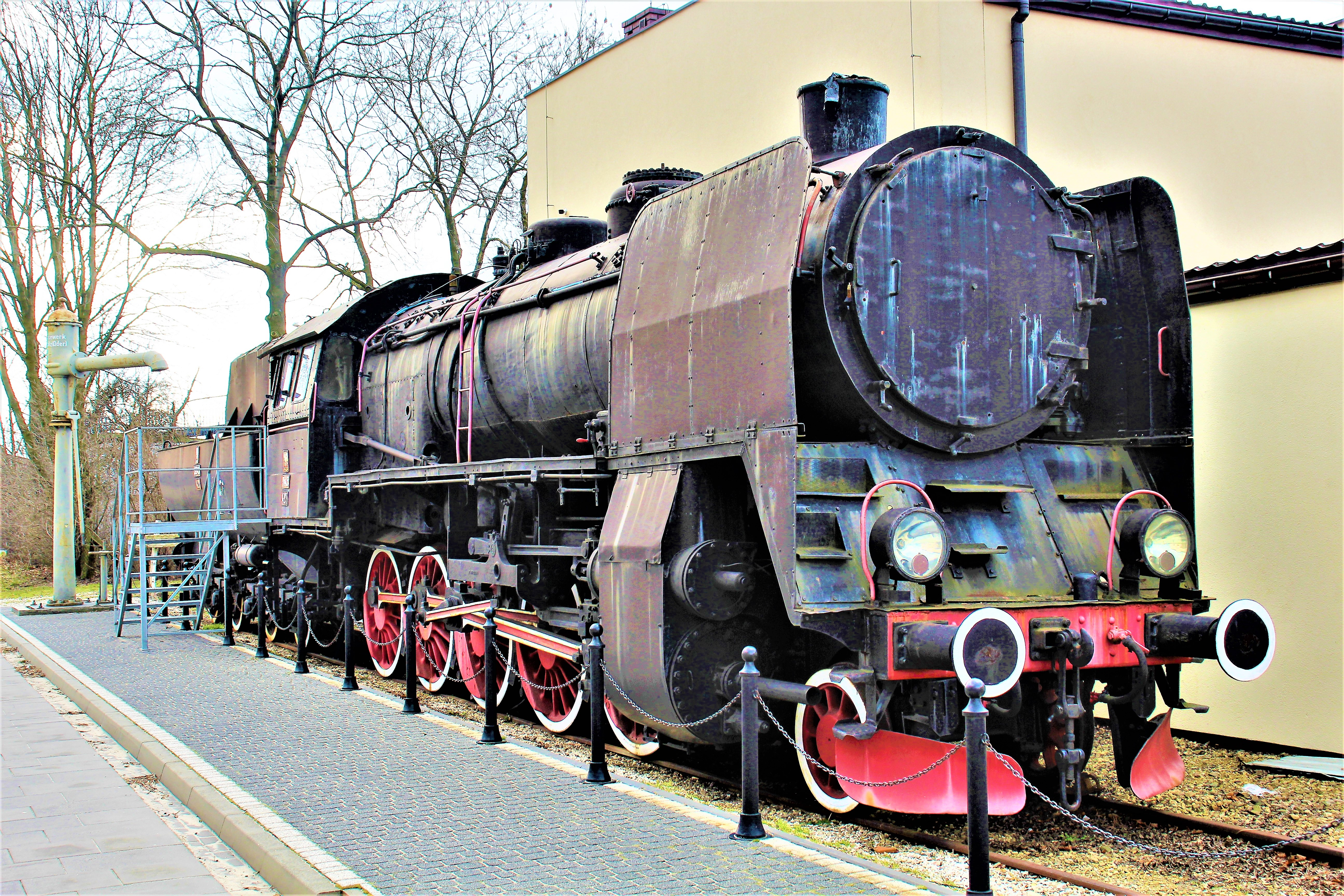
Historic Ty45-421 steam locomotive

- Depot buildings from the late 19th century
- Historic Ty45-421 steam locomotive at the railroad station
- Refractories factory buildings from the late 19th century
- Wooden buildings from the late 19th century
- Saint Michael's church built in years 1934–1949
- Historic water tower
