= Tarczyn (disambiguation) =

Tarczyn may refer to the following:

- Tarczyn, a town in Masovian Voivodeship (east-central Poland)
- Tarczyn, Lower Silesian Voivodeship, a village in Lwówek County, Lower Silesian Voivodeship (SW Poland)
- Tarczyn, a brand of Agros Nova products
