= Niemczyn =

Niemczyn may refer to:

- Niemczyn, Podlaskie Voivodeship, village in Białystok County, Podlaskie Voivodeship, in north-eastern Poland
- Niemczyn, Greater Poland Voivodeship, village in Wągrowiec County, Greater Poland Voivodeship, in west-central Poland
- Gromada Niemczyn former gromada (1954–1972) in former Poznań Voivodeship (1945–1975), Poland
