= Klecza =

- Village
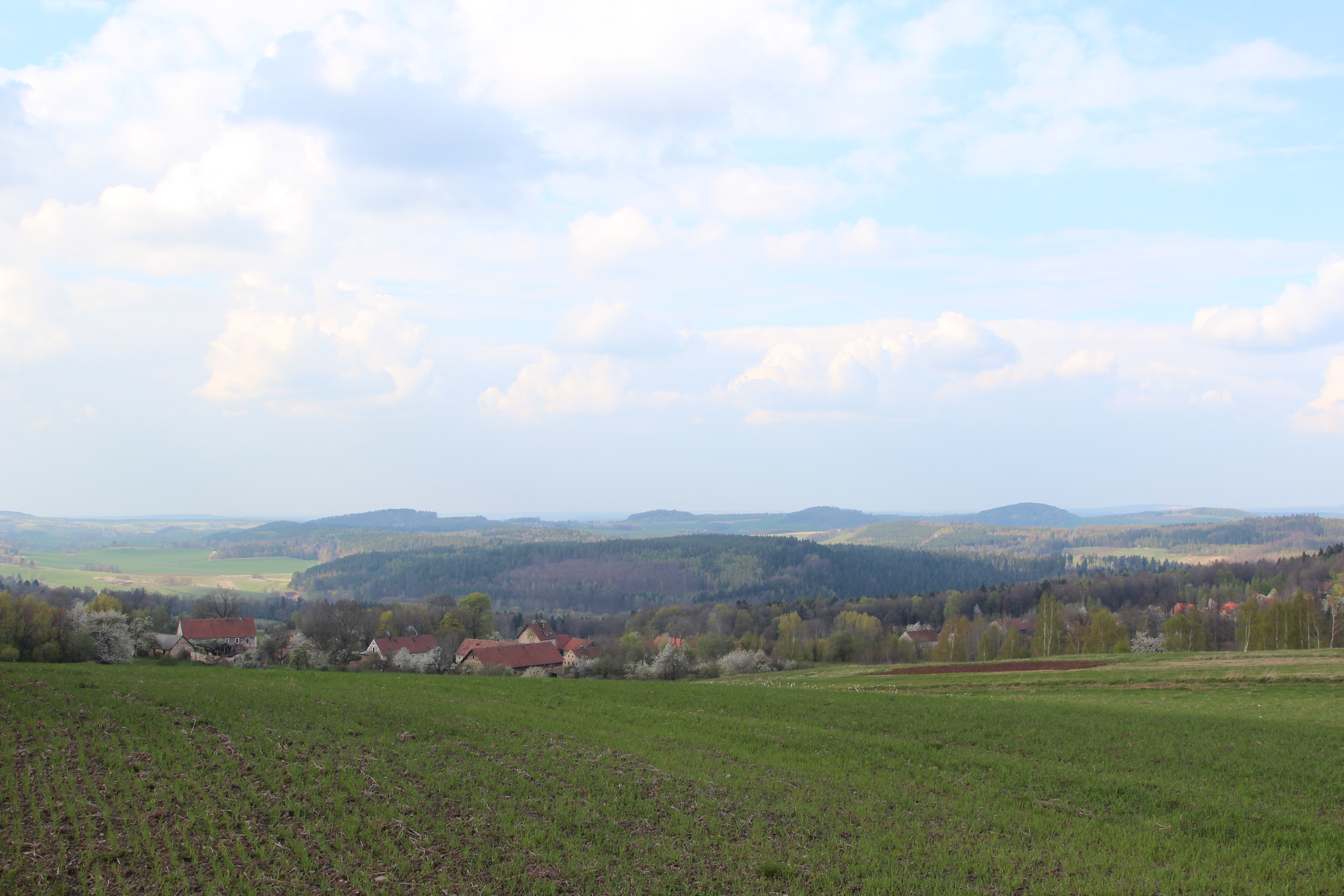

- Location within Poland
- Coordinates: 51°00′26″N 15°37′52″E
- Country: Poland
- Voivodeship: Lower Silesian
- County: Lwówek
- Gmina: Wleń

Klecza [ˈklɛt͡ʂa] is a village in the administrative district of Gmina Wleń, within Lwówek County, Lower Silesian Voivodeship, in south-western Poland.

== Interesting Place ==
- Wleń Castle
