= Strzyżowiec =

Strzyżowiec may refer to the following places in Poland:

- Strzyżowiec, Lower Silesian Voivodeship (south-west Poland)
- Strzyżowiec, Lublin Voivodeship (east Poland)
