= Oskar Zimmermann =

German fighter ace and Knight's Cross recipient (1917–1976)

- Born: 6 December 1917; Wiesenthal-Löwenberg
- Died: 12 June 1976 (aged 58); Bad Hersfeld
- Military career
- Allegiance: Nazi Germany
- Branch: Luftwaffe
- Service years: 1939–1945
- Rank: Leutnant (second lieutenant)
- Unit: JG 3
- Conflicts: World War II: Defence of the Reich; Operation Bodenplatte
- Awards: Knight's Cross of the Iron Cross

Oskar Zimmermann (6 December 1917 – 12 June 1976) was a German Luftwaffe ace and recipient of the Knight's Cross of the Iron Cross during World War II. The Knight's Cross of the Iron Cross, and its variants were the highest awards in the military and paramilitary forces of Nazi Germany during World War II. He received this award after 28 aerial victories—that is, 28 aerial combat encounters resulting in the destruction of the enemy aircraft.

== World War II ==
On 7 April 1944, Zimmermann was appointed Staffelkapitän (squadron leader) of 6. Staffel of JG 3. He replaced Hauptmann Heinrich Sannemann who was transferred and led the Staffel until late April when Zimmermann took command. On 19 May, Zimmermann and his wingman had a mid-air collision. Both pilots bailed out and were unhurt, their Messerschmitt Bf 109 aircraft crashed southeast of Wittenberge.

In July, Zimmermann was transferred again and appointed Staffelkapitän of 9. Staffel of JG 3. He succeeded Leutnant Dieter Zink who had been shot down by anti-aircraft artillery and taken prisoner of war on 11 July. Zimmermann was awarded the Knight's Cross of the Iron Cross (Ritterkreuz des Eisernen Kreuzes) on 29 October for 28 aerial victories claimed. On 18 December during the Battle of the Bulge, Zimmermann claimed his 29th aerial victory when he shot down a Republic P-47 Thunderbolt fighter. On 1 January 1945 during Operation Bodenplatte, Zimmermann claimed a Hawker Tempest shot down.

== Later life ==
Zimmermann died on 12 February 1976 at the age of 58 in Bad Hersfeld, West Germany.

== Summary of career ==
=== Aerial victory claims ===
According to Obermaier, Zimmermann was credited with 34 victories in over 580 combat missions, 28 of which claimed on the Western Front including 14 heavy bombers. Mathews and Foreman, authors of Luftwaffe Aces — Biographies and Victory Claims, researched the German Federal Archives and state that he was credited with at least 28 aerial victories, plus two further unconfirmed claims. Of this figure, he claimed six aerial victories on the Eastern Front and more than 22 over the Western Allies, including eleven four-engined heavy bombers.

Victory claims were logged to a map-reference (PQ = Planquadrat), for example "PQ 46264". The Luftwaffe grid map (Jägermeldenetz) covered all of Europe, western Russia and North Africa and was composed of rectangles measuring 15 minutes of latitude by 30 minutes of longitude, an area of about 360 square miles (930 km^{2}). These sectors were then subdivided into 36 smaller units to give a location area 3 km × 4 km (1.9 mi × 2.5 mi) in size.

Chronicle of aerial victories
This along with the * (asterisk) indicates an Herausschuss (separation shot)—a severely damaged heavy bomber forced to separate from his combat box which was counted as an aerial victory. This and the ? (question mark) indicates information discrepancies listed by Prien, Stemmer, Rodeike, Bock, Mathews and Foreman.
Claim	Date	Time	Type	Location	Claim	Date	Time	Type	Location
– 8. Staffel of Jagdgeschwader 51 – Eastern Front — 1 May 1942 – March 1943
1	4 August 1942	19:15	Il-2	PQ 46264; 30 km (19 mi) east-northeast of Konaja	2	18 March 1943	08:28	MiG-3	PQ 35 Ost 53594; 15 km (9.3 mi) north-north-east of Dmitriyev-Lgovsky
– Stab III. Gruppe of Jagdgeschwader 51 – Eastern Front — July – August 1943
3	5 July 1943	11:00	MiG-3	PQ 35 Ost 63582; 20 km (12 mi) southwest of Maloarkhangelsk	5	15 July 1943	15:50	P-39	PQ 35 Ost 54453; 25 km (16 mi) northwest of Bolkhov
4	6 July 1943	09:03	La-5	PQ 35 Ost 63592; 15 km (9.3 mi) south-southwest of Maloarkhangelsk	6	18 August 1943	14:34	LaGG-3	PQ 35 Ost 26732; 15 km (9.3 mi) northeast of Moschna
– 11. Sturmstaffel of Jagdgeschwader 3 "Udet" – Defense of the Reich — February – 24 April 1944
7	8 April 1944	14:16	B-17	northwest of Braunschweig	12	18 April 1944	14:32	B-17	northwest of Nauen
8	11 April 1944	11:04	B-17	20 km (12 mi) west of Haldensleben	13? (Note: According to Mathews and Foreman, this claim is unconfirmed.)	18 April 1944	—	B-17*	
9	11 April 1944	11:05	P-38	20 km (12 mi) west of Haldensleben	14	19 April 1944	10:46	B-17	PQ 15 Ost S/LA southeast of Göttingen
10	11 April 1944	13:15	B-17	20 km (12 mi) south of Rostock	15	24 April 1944	13:35	B-17	PQ 04 Ost S/CE, northeast of Munich south of Landshut
11	13 April 1944	14:00	B-17*	PQ 05 Ost S/ST-3	16?	24 April 1944	—	B-17*	
– 6. Staffel of Jagdgeschwader 3 "Udet" – Defense of the Reich — 29 April – 6 June 1944
17	29 April 1944	11:05	B-17	northwest of Magdeburg	20	13 May 1944	14:30	P-51	PQ 15 Ost S/AF; Jördenstorf-Demmin
18	8 May 1944	10:17	B-24	southwest of Braunschweig	21	19 May 1944	13:46	B-17	Dreis-Brück
19	8 May 1944	10:40	B-24*	west of Braunschweig	22	30 May 1944	11:45	P-51	Braunschweig
– 6. Staffel of Jagdgeschwader 3 "Udet" – Invasion of Normandy — 7 June – July 1944
23	12 June 1944	15:12	P-47	PQ 04 Ost N/AC-2 vicinity of Dreux	25	25 July 1944	11:25	P-51	PQ 04 Ost N/BD-9/BE-7 vicinity of Dourdan
24	24 July 1944	15:31	P-51	PQ 15 West UU-2/4 vicinity of Caen					
– 9. Staffel of Jagdgeschwader 3 "Udet" – Invasion of Normandy — August – 22 September 1944
26	14 August 1944	16:50	P-47	PQ 04 Ost N/CC-2/3 southeast of Chartres	28	22 August 1944	14:37	P-47	PQ 04 Ost N/AJ-3/6 south of Châlons-sur-Marne
27	18 August 1944	19:25	P-51	PQ 04 Ost N/TE-7/8 vicinity of Beauvais					
– 9. Staffel of Jagdgeschwader 3 "Udet" – Defense of the Reich and on the Western Front — 24 November 1944 – January 1945
29	18 December 1944	13:27	P-47	PQ 05 Ost OO-2; Lommersum	30	1 January 1945	—	Tempest	

=== Awards ===
- Iron Cross (1939) 2nd and 1st Class
- German Cross in Gold (1 October 1944) as Leutnant in the 9./Jagdgeschwader 3
- Knight's Cross of the Iron Cross on 29 October 1944 as Leutnant and pilot in the 9./Jagdgeschwader 3 "Udet" (Note: According to Scherzer on 24 October 1944 as Staffelführer in the III./Jagdgeschwader 3 "Udet".)
