= Miąża =

- Village
- Location within Poland
- Coordinates: 52°49′27″N 17°27′36″E
- Country: Poland
- Voivodeship: Greater Poland
- County: Wągrowiec
- Gmina: Damasławek

Miąża [ˈmjɔ̃ʐa] is a village in the administrative district of Gmina Damasławek, within Wągrowiec County, Greater Poland Voivodeship, in west-central Poland.
