= Kądzielów =

- Village
- Location within Poland
- Coordinates: 50°28′09″N 19°24′17″E
- Country: Poland
- Voivodeship: Silesian
- County: Zawiercie
- Gmina: Łazy

Kądzielów [kɔnˈd͡ʑɛluf] is a village in the administrative district of Gmina Łazy, within Zawiercie County, Silesian Voivodeship, in southern Poland.
