= Międzylesie, Wągrowiec County =

Międzylesie
- Village
- Location within Poland
- Coordinates: 52°48′48″N 17°27′46″E
- Country: Poland
- Voivodeship: Greater Poland
- County: Wągrowiec
- Gmina: Damasławek
- Population: 2,766

Międzylesie [mjɛnd͡zɨˈlɛɕɛ] is a village in the administrative district of Gmina Damasławek, within Wągrowiec County, Greater Poland Voivodeship, in west-central Poland.
