= Damasławek =

- Village
- Location within Poland
- Coordinates: 52°50′N 17°31′E
- Country: Poland
- Voivodeship: Greater Poland
- County: Wągrowiec
- Gmina: Damasławek
- Population: 2,500
- Website: http://www.damaslawek.pl/

Damasławek ([damaˈswavɛk]) is a village in Wągrowiec County, Greater Poland Voivodeship, in west-central Poland. It is the seat of the gmina (administrative district) called Gmina Damasławek.
