= Bełczyna =

- Village
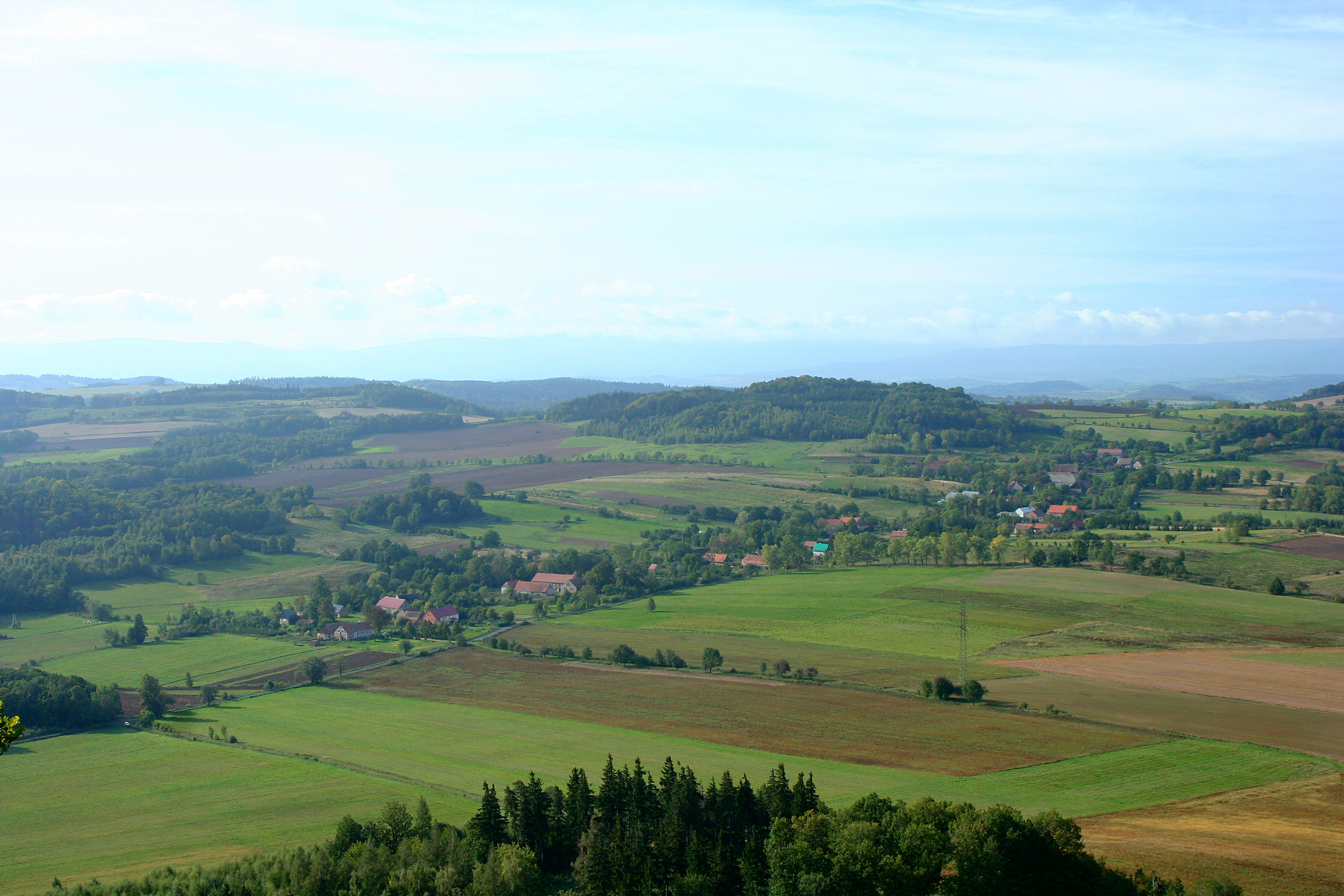
- General view

- Location within Poland
- Coordinates: 51°2′N 15°44′E
- Country: Poland
- Voivodeship: Lower Silesian
- County: Lwówek
- Gmina: Wleń

Bełczyna [bɛu̯ˈt͡ʂɨna] (German: Süßenbach / Süssenbach) is a village in the administrative district of Gmina Wleń, within Lwówek County, Lower Silesian Voivodeship, in south-western Poland.
