= Kołybki =

- Village
- Location within Poland
- Coordinates: 52°51′45″N 17°23′19″E
- Country: Poland
- Voivodeship: Greater Poland
- County: Wągrowiec
- Gmina: Damasławek
- Population: 240

Kołybki [kɔˈwɨpki] is a village in the administrative district of Gmina Damasławek, within Wągrowiec County, Greater Poland Voivodeship, in west-central Poland.
