= Dąbrowa, Wągrowiec County =

Dąbrowa
- Village
- Location within Poland
- Coordinates: 52°49′N 17°30′E
- Country: Poland
- Voivodeship: Greater Poland
- County: Wągrowiec
- Gmina: Damasławek
- Population: 390

Dąbrowa [dɔmˈbrɔva] is a village in the administrative district of Gmina Damasławek, within Wągrowiec County, Greater Poland Voivodeship, in west-central Poland.
