= Przeździedza =

- Village
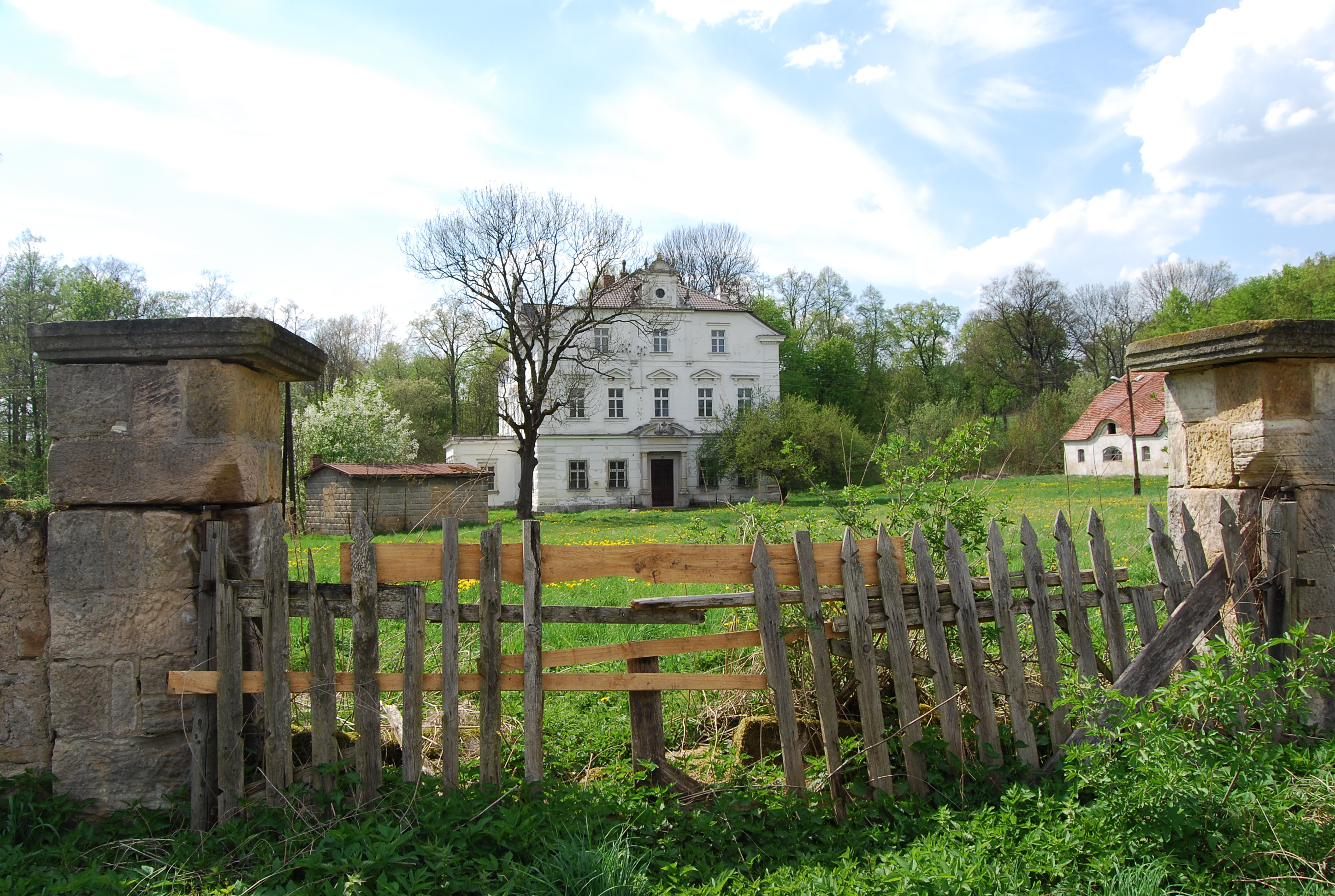
- Palace

- Location within Poland
- Coordinates: 51°03′13″N 15°41′15″E
- Country: Poland
- Voivodeship: Lower Silesian
- County: Lwówek
- Gmina: Wleń

Przeździedza [pʂɛʑˈd͡ʑɛd͡za] is a village in the administrative district of Gmina Wleń, within Lwówek County, Lower Silesian Voivodeship, in south-western Poland.
