= Gmina Damasławek =

Gmina Damasławek Damasławek Commune
- Gmina
- Coat of arms
- Interactive map of Gmina Damasławek
- Coordinates (Damasławek): 52°50′N 17°31′E
- Country: Poland
- Voivodeship: Greater Poland
- County: Wągrowiec
- Seat: Damasławek

Area
  - Total: 104.68 km^{2} (40.42 sq mi)

Population (2006)
  - Total: 5,497
  - Density: 52.51/km^{2} (136.0/sq mi)
- Website: http://damaslawek.pl/

Gmina Damasławek is a rural gmina (administrative district) in Wągrowiec County, Greater Poland Voivodeship, in west-central Poland. Its seat is the village of Damasławek, which lies approximately 22 kilometres (14 mi) east of Wągrowiec and 63 km (39 mi) north-east of the regional capital Poznań.

The gmina covers an area of 104.68 square kilometres (40.4 sq mi), and as of 2006 its total population is 5,497.

== Villages ==
Gmina Damasławek contains the villages and settlements of Dąbrowa, Damasławek, Gruntowice, Kołybki, Kopanina, Kozielsko, Miąża, Międzylesie, Modrzewie, Mokronosy, Niemczyn, Piotrkowice, Rakowo, Smuszewo, Starężyn, Starężynek, Stępuchowo, Turza and Wiśniewko.

== Neighbouring gminas ==
Gmina Damasławek is bordered by the gminas of Gołańcz, Janowiec Wielkopolski, Mieścisko, Wągrowiec, Wapno and Żnin.
