= Marczów =

- Village
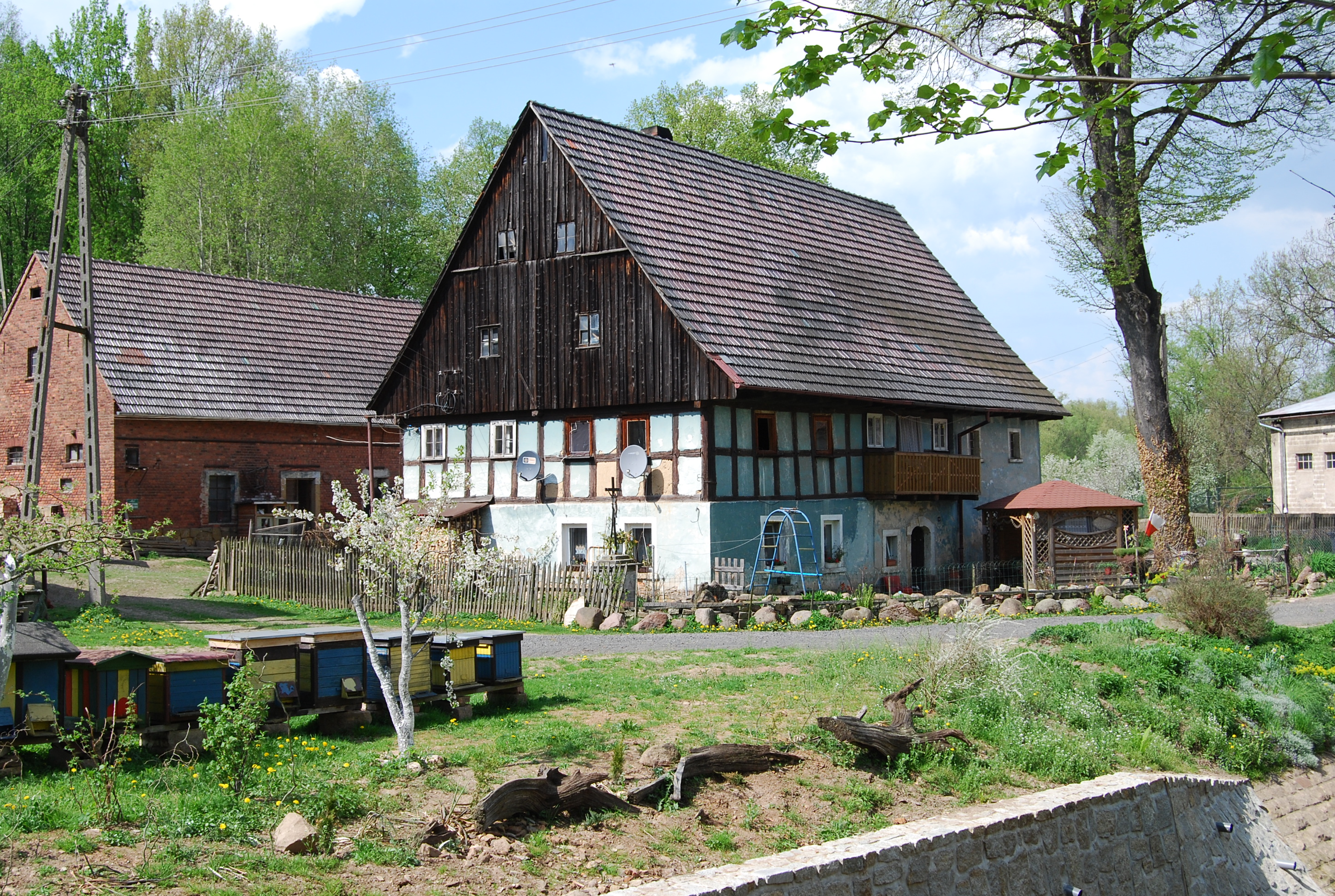

- Location within Poland
- Coordinates: 51°2′41″N 15°38′39″E
- Country: Poland
- Voivodeship: Lower Silesian
- County: Lwówek
- Gmina: Wleń

Marczów [ˈmart͡ʂuf] is a village in the administrative district of Gmina Wleń, within Lwówek County, Lower Silesian Voivodeship, in south-western Poland.
