= Wiśniewko, Greater Poland Voivodeship =

Wiśniewko
- Village
- Location within Poland
- Coordinates: 52°52′N 17°23′E
- Country: Poland
- Voivodeship: Greater Poland
- County: Wągrowiec
- Gmina: Damasławek

Wiśniewko [viɕˈɲɛfkɔ] is a village in the administrative district of Gmina Damasławek, within Wągrowiec County, Greater Poland Voivodeship, in west-central Poland.
