= Gmina Wleń =

Gmina Wleń Wleń Commune
- Gmina
- Coat of arms
- Interactive map of Gmina Wleń
- Coordinates (Wleń): 51°01′00″N 15°40′14″E
- Country: Poland
- Voivodeship: Lower Silesian
- County: Lwówek
- Seat: Wleń
- Sołectwos: Bełczyna, Bystrzyca, Klecza, Modrzewie, Nielestno, Pilchowice, Radomice, Strzyżowiec, Tarczyn

Area
  - Total: 86 km^{2} (33 sq mi)

Population (2019-06-30)
  - Total: 4,225
  - Density: 49/km^{2} (130/sq mi)
  - Urban: 1,759
  - Rural: 2,466
- Website: http://www.wlen.pl

Gmina Wleń is an urban-rural gmina (administrative district) in Lwówek County, Lower Silesian Voivodeship, in south-western Poland. Its seat is the town of Wleń, which lies approximately 13 kilometres (8 mi) south-east of Lwówek Śląski, and 97 kilometres (60 mi) west of the regional capital Wrocław.

The gmina covers an area of 86 square kilometres (33.2 sq mi), and as of 2019 its total population is 4,225.

== Neighbouring gminas ==
Gmina Wleń is bordered by the gminas of Jeżów Sudecki, Lubomierz, Lwówek Śląski, Pielgrzymka and Świerzawa.

== Villages ==
Apart from the town of Wleń, the gmina contains the villages of Bełczyna, Bystrzyca, Klecza, Łupki, Marczów, Modrzewie, Nielestno, Pilchowice, Przeździedza, Radomice, Strzyżowiec, Tarczyn and Wleński Gródek.
