= Kuźnica Masłońska =

- Village
- Location within Poland
- Coordinates: 50°27′25″N 19°24′3″E
- Country: Poland
- Voivodeship: Silesian
- County: Zawiercie
- Gmina: Łazy

Kuźnica Masłońska (Polish pronunciation: [kuʑˈɲit͡sa maˈswɔj̃ska]) is a village in the administrative district of Gmina Łazy, within Zawiercie County, Silesian Voivodeship, in southern Poland.
