= Radomice, Lower Silesian Voivodeship =

Radomice
- Village
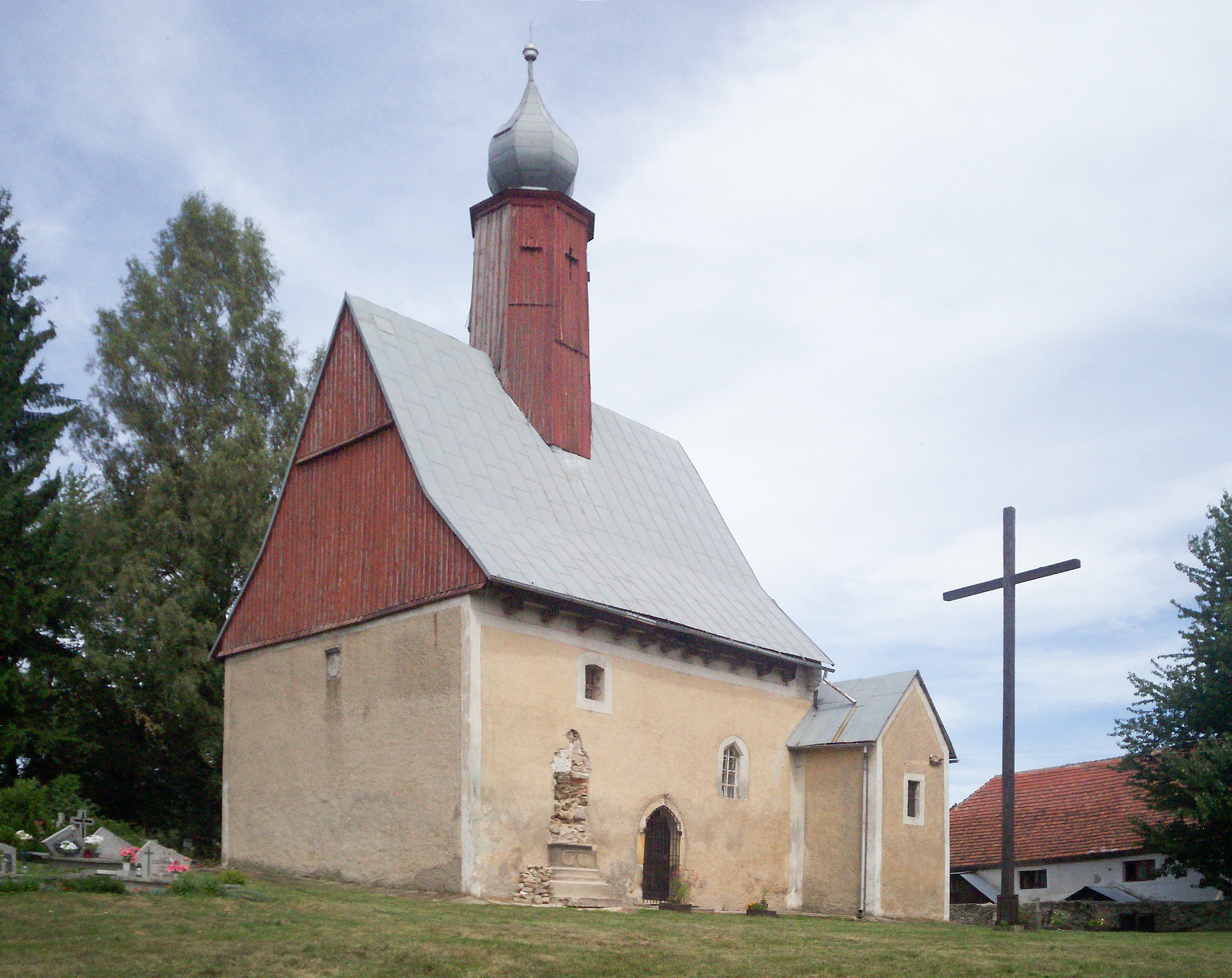
- Saints James and Catherine church

- Location within Poland
- Coordinates: 51°0′1″N 15°36′43″E
- Country: Poland
- Voivodeship: Lower Silesian
- County: Lwówek
- Gmina: Wleń

Radomice [radɔˈmit͡sɛ] is a village in the administrative district of Gmina Wleń, within Lwówek County, Lower Silesian Voivodeship, in south-western Poland.
