= Piotrkowice, Wągrowiec County =

Piotrkowice
- Village
- Location within Poland
- Coordinates: 52°52′N 17°31′E
- Country: Poland
- Voivodeship: Greater Poland
- County: Wągrowiec
- Gmina: Damasławek

Piotrkowice [pjɔtrkɔˈvit͡sɛ] is a village in the administrative district of Gmina Damasławek, within Wągrowiec County, Greater Poland Voivodeship, in west-central Poland.
