= Rakowo, Wągrowiec County =

Rakowo
- Village
- Location within Poland
- Coordinates: 52°51′06″N 17°22′53″E
- Country: Poland
- Voivodeship: Greater Poland
- County: Wągrowiec
- Gmina: Damasławek

Rakowo [raˈkɔvɔ] is a village in the administrative district of Gmina Damasławek, within Wągrowiec County, Greater Poland Voivodeship, in west-central Poland.
