= Wleń =

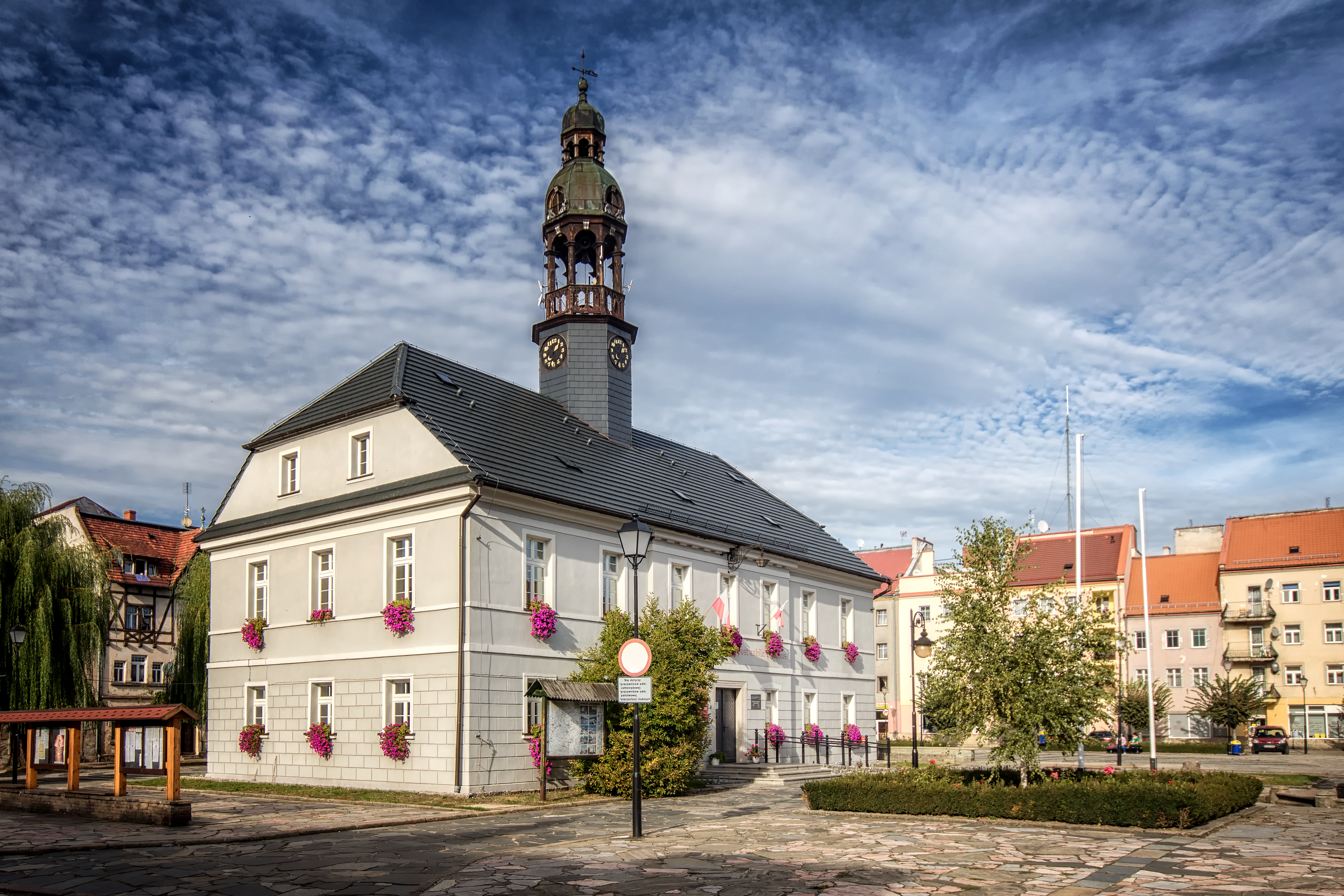
- Historic marketplace and town hall

- Coat of arms

- Location within Poland
- Coordinates: 51°1′0″N 15°40′14″E
- Country: Poland
- Voivodeship: Lower Silesian
- County: Lwówek
- Gmina: Wleń
- Founded: 13th century
- Town rights: Before 1261

Area
  - Total: 7.22 km^{2} (2.79 sq mi)

Population (2019-06-30)
  - Total: 1,759
  - Density: 244/km^{2} (631/sq mi)
- Time zone: UTC+1 (CET)
  - Summer (DST): UTC+2 (CEST)
- Vehicle registration: DLW
- Climate: Dfb
- Website: http://www.wlen.pl

Wleń [vlɛɲ] (German: Lähn) is a town in Lwówek County, Lower Silesian Voivodeship, in south-western Poland. It is the seat of the administrative district (gmina) called Gmina Wleń. As of 2019, it has a population of 1,759.

== History ==
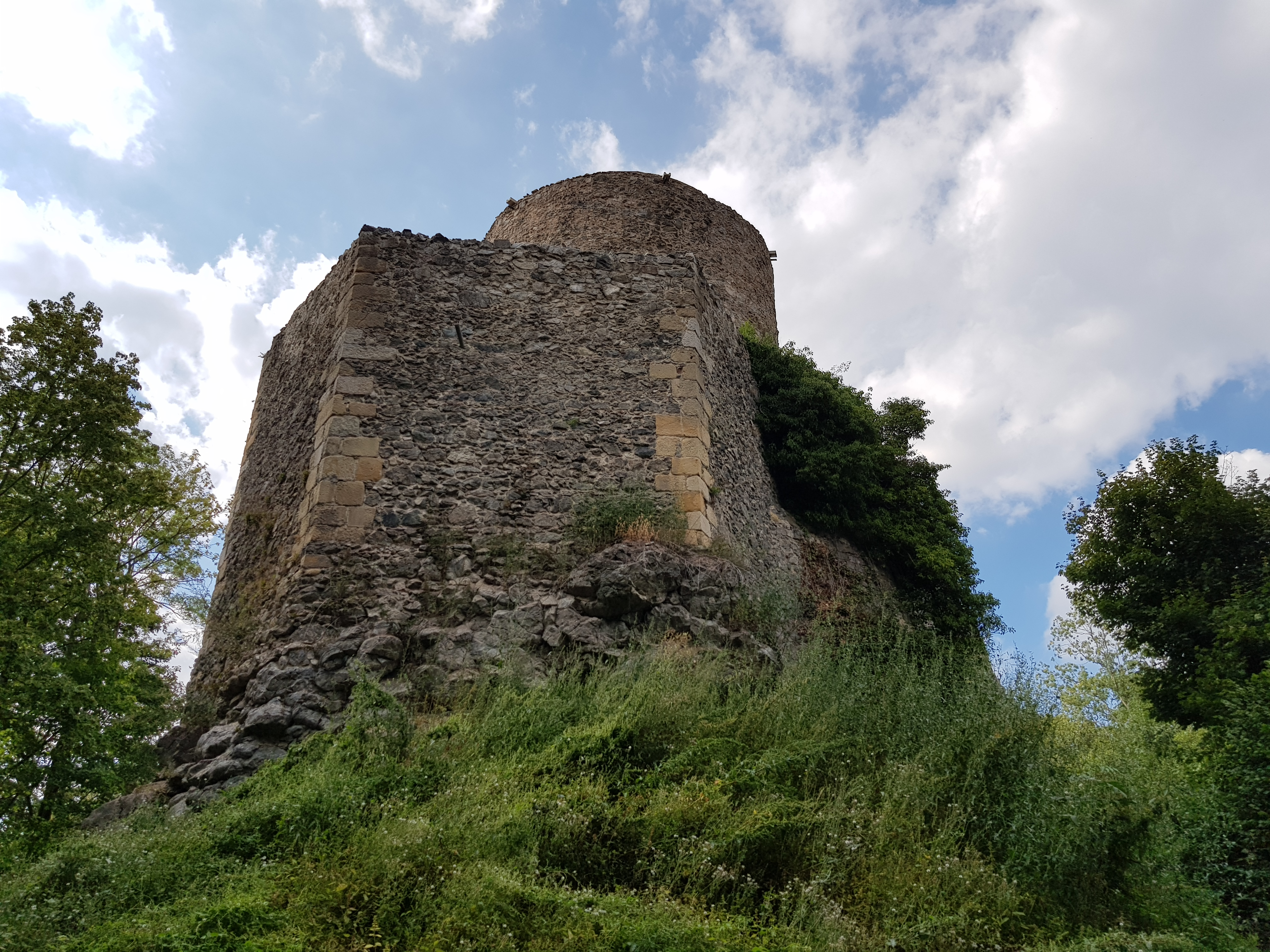
Medieval Wleń Castle Tower

Wleń was established in 1214 by the Silesian duke Henry I the Bearded and his wife Hedwig of Andechs, as part of fragmented medieval Poland. It was located near the Wleń Castle, one of the oldest castles in Poland, which served as a seat of a castellany that was probably founded in 1108 by Polish ruler Bolesław III Wrymouth. The castle was expanded in the late 12th and early 13th centuries by Dukes Bolesław I the Tall and Henry I the Bearded, and Henry I with his wife often stayed in the castle. The name comes from the Polish word wał, which means "rampart", referring to its plausible role as a Polish defensive stronghold against possible incursions from Bohemia. In 1215, the Saint Nicholas church was founded. Wleń was granted town rights before 1261. As a result of further fragmentation of Poland into smaller district principalities, Wleń formed part of the duchies of Legnica and Jawor.

The town was flooded on 16 September 2024, during the 2024 Central European floods.

== Sights ==
- The ruins of the one of two oldest castles in Poland Wleń Castle with its only remaining tower, are visible from the town. Originally foundation of Silesian Dukes, later property of the Haugwitz noble family, the castle is located in the neighbouring village of Łupki. The castle served to protect the nearby borders with Bohemia and Upper Lusatia and was devastated during the Thirty Years' War. A Baroque palace was rebuilt underneath it. The picture above shows the view of Wleń town from the top of the tower, which currently stands less than half its original height. In 2005, a western portion of one of the castle's outer walls crumbled, forcing the castle to be temporarily closed to tourists. The crumbled section of the outer wall was rebuilt over time using funds from the Polish government and the European Union and completed in 2009.
- Baroque Wleń Palace
- Neoclassicist Town Hall at the Market Square and the Gothic Revival Saint Nicholas church.

== Gallery ==
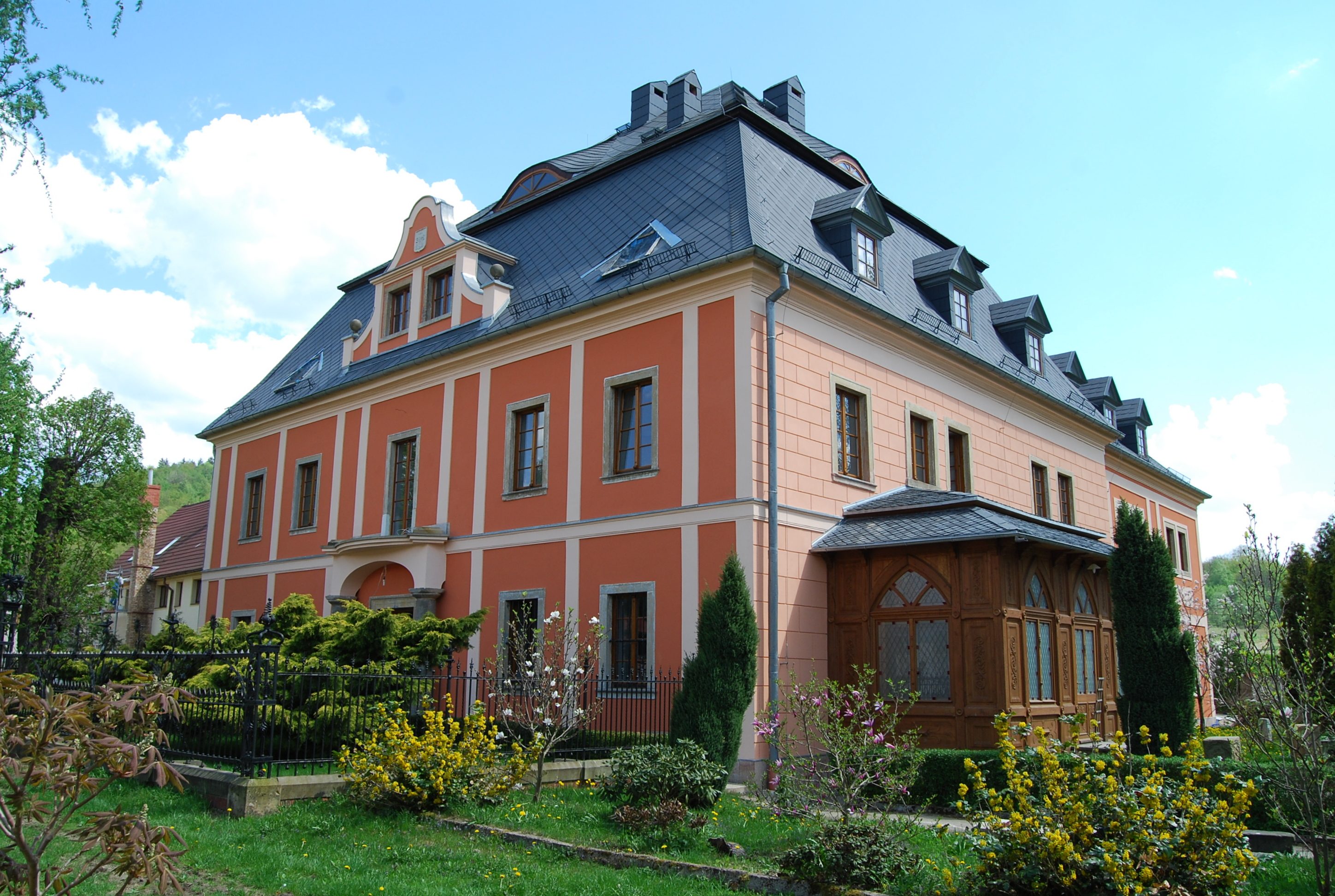
Wleń Palace

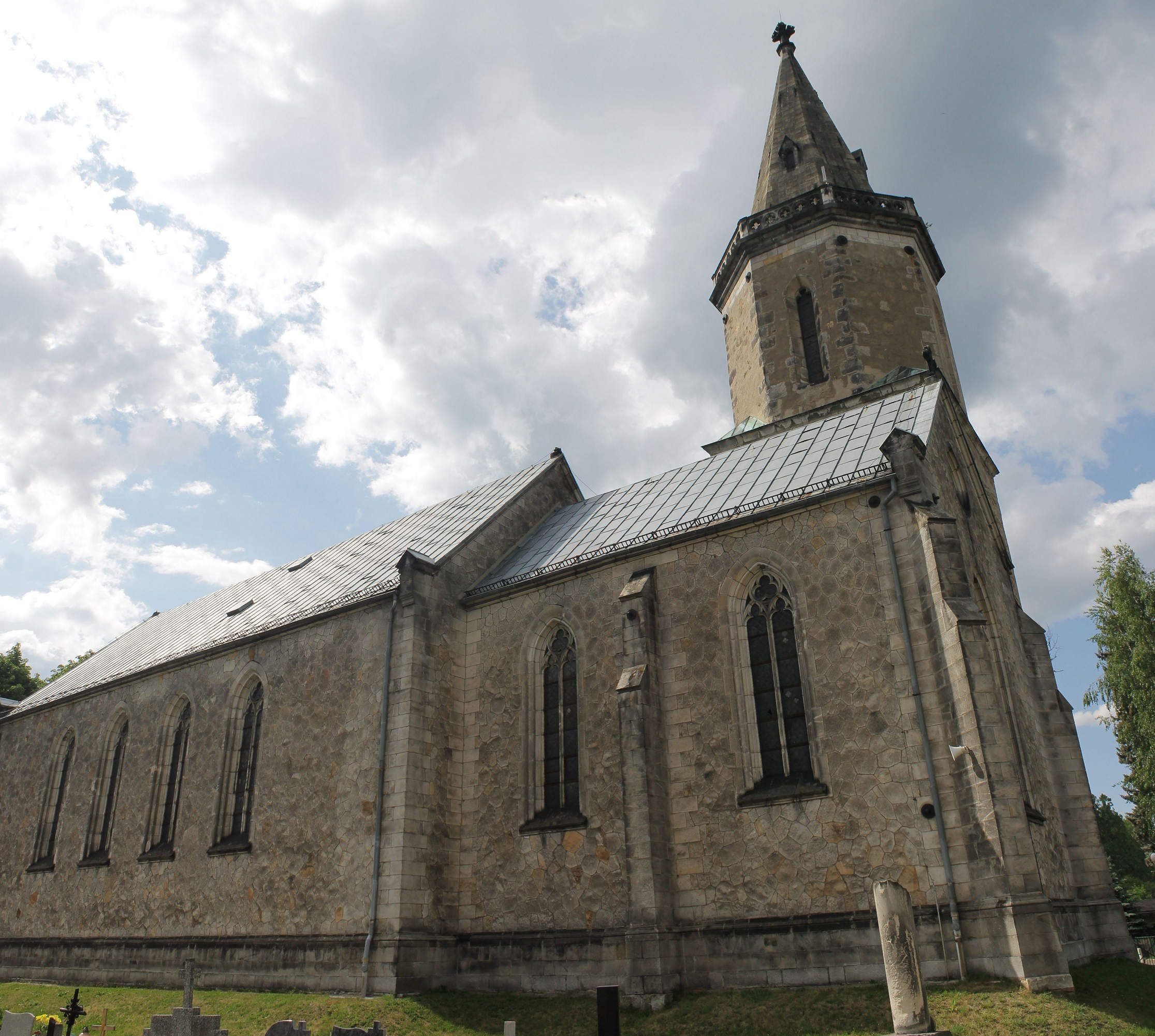
Saint Nicholas church

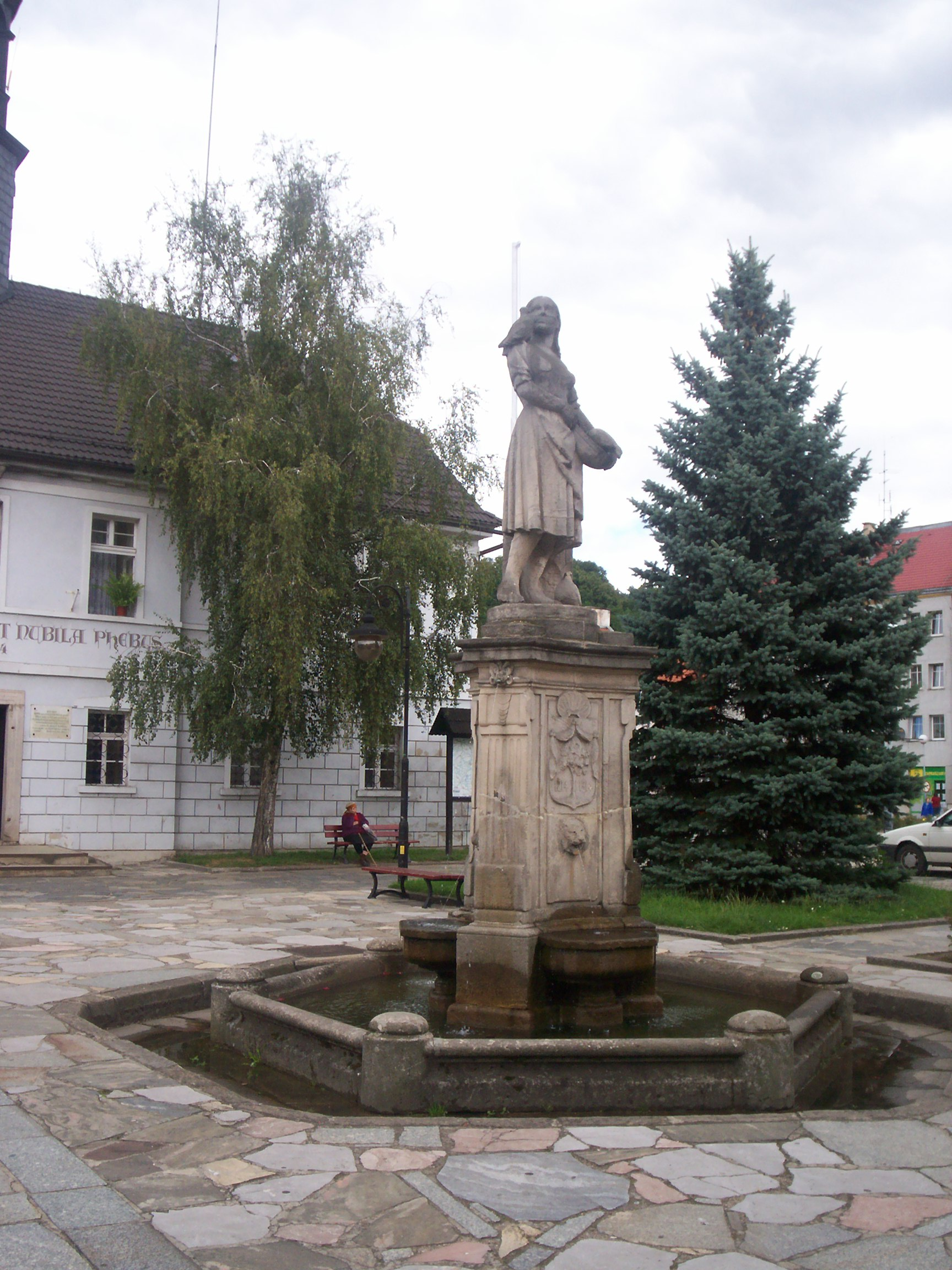
Fountain on the Market Square

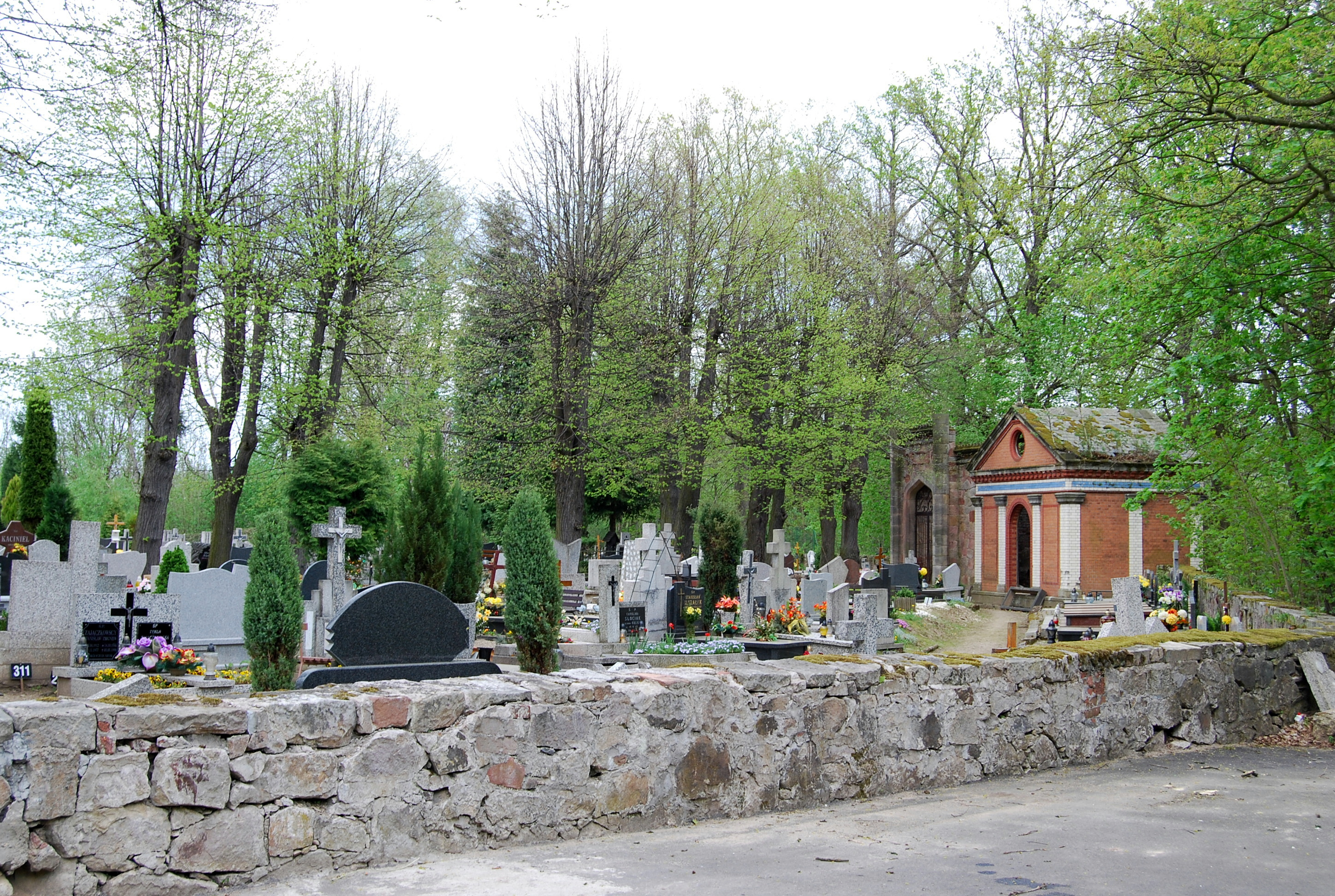
Cemetery in Wleń
