= Smuszewo =

- Village
- Location within Poland
- Coordinates: 52°53′N 17°25′E
- Country: Poland
- Voivodeship: Greater Poland
- County: Wągrowiec
- Gmina: Damasławek

Smuszewo [smuˈʂɛvɔ] is a village in the administrative district of Gmina Damasławek, within Wągrowiec County, Greater Poland Voivodeship, in west-central Poland.
