= Gmina Łazy =

Gmina Łazy Łazy Commune
- Gmina
- Coat of arms
- Interactive map of Gmina Łazy
- Coordinates (Łazy): 50°26′N 19°24′E
- Country: Poland
- Voivodeship: Silesian
- County: Zawiercie
- Seat: Łazy

Area
  - Total: 132.56 km^{2} (51.18 sq mi)

Population (2019-06-30)
  - Total: 15,923
  - Density: 120.12/km^{2} (311.11/sq mi)
  - Urban: 6,811
  - Rural: 9,112
- Website: https://lazy.pl

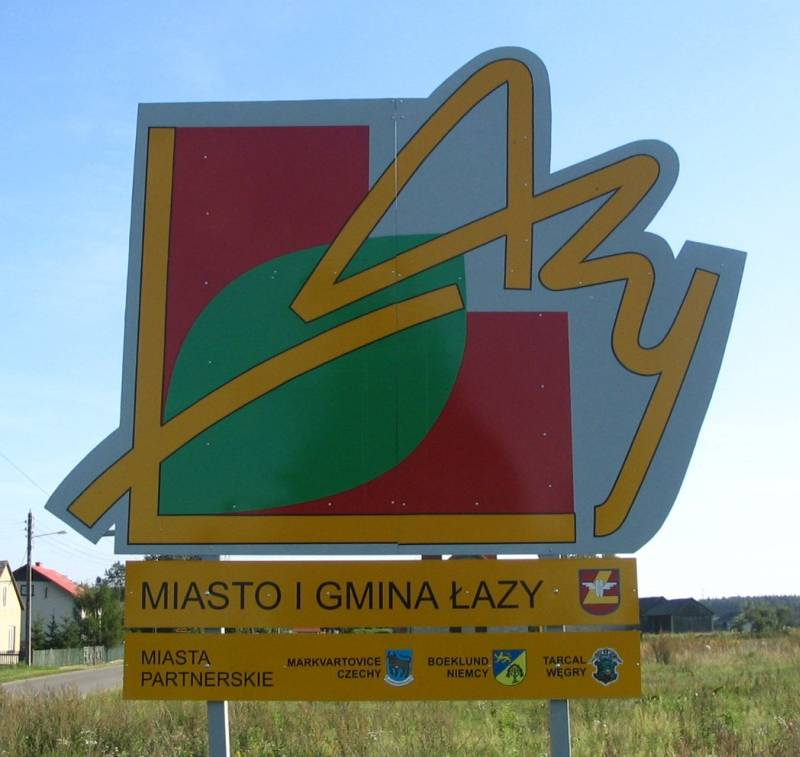
Gmina Łazy-tablica wjazdowa

Gmina Łazy is an urban-rural gmina (administrative district) in Zawiercie County, Silesian Voivodeship, in southern Poland. Its seat is the town of Łazy, which lies approximately 8 kilometres (5 mi) south of Zawiercie and 35 km (22 mi) north-east of the regional capital Katowice.

The gmina covers an area of 132.56 square kilometres (51.2 sq mi), and as of 2019 its total population is 15,923.

The gmina contains part of the protected area called Eagle Nests Landscape Park.

== Villages ==
Apart from the town of Łazy, Gmina Łazy contains the villages and settlements of Kądzielów, Kuźnica Masłońska, Rokitno Szlacheckie and Turza.

== Neighbouring gminas ==
Gmina Łazy is bordered by the towns of Dąbrowa Górnicza, Poręba and Zawiercie, and by the gminas of Klucze, Ogrodzieniec and Siewierz.
