= Turza, Zawiercie County =

Turza
- Village
- Location within Poland
- Coordinates: 50°27′32″N 19°23′7″E
- Country: Poland
- Voivodeship: Silesian
- County: Zawiercie
- Gmina: Łazy

Turza [ˈtuʐa] is a village in the administrative district of Gmina Łazy, within Zawiercie County, Silesian Voivodeship, in southern Poland.
