= Rokitno Szlacheckie =

- Village
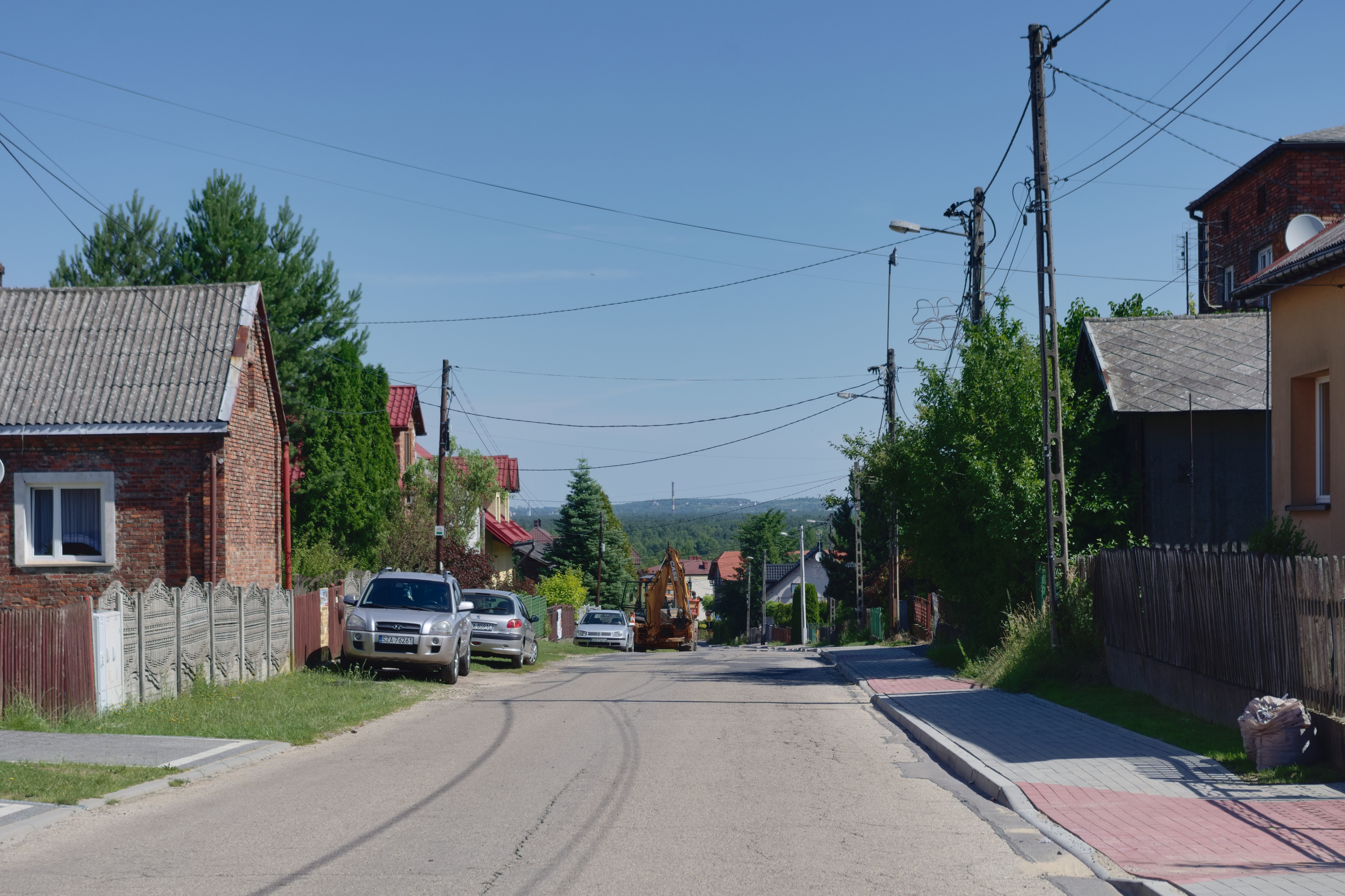
- 1 Maja Street (2023)

- Location within Poland
- Coordinates: 50°26′N 19°27′E
- Country: Poland
- Voivodeship: Silesian
- County: Zawiercie
- Gmina: Łazy

Rokitno Szlacheckie [rɔˈkitnɔ ʂlaˈxɛt͡skʲɛ] is a village in the administrative district of Gmina Łazy, within Zawiercie County, Silesian Voivodeship, in southern Poland.
