= Modrzewie, Lower Silesian Voivodeship =

Modrzewie
- Village
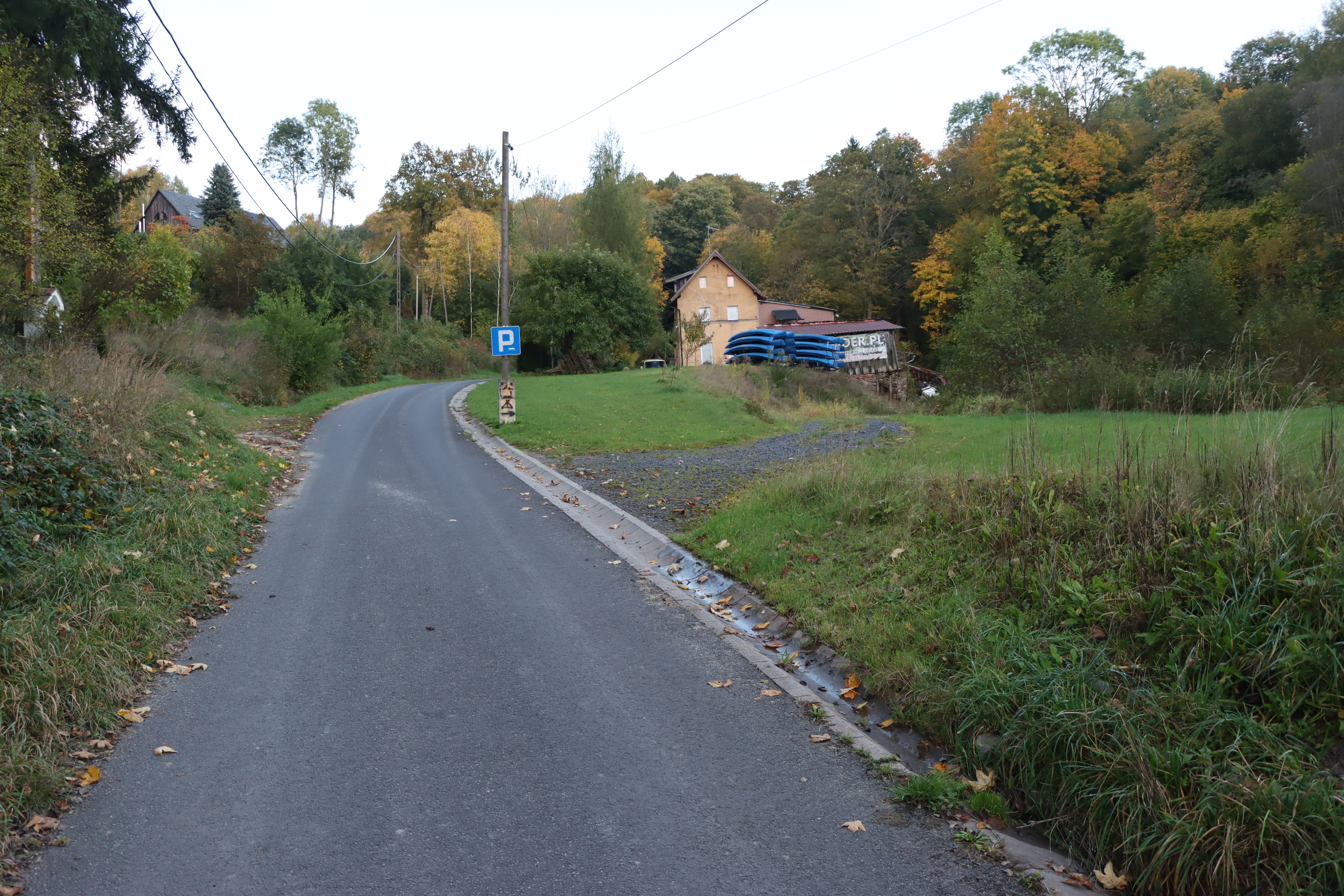

- Location within Poland
- Coordinates: 51°00′05″N 15°42′30″E
- Country: Poland
- Voivodeship: Lower Silesian
- County: Lwówek
- Gmina: Wleń

Modrzewie (Polish pronunciation: [mɔdˈʐɛvjɛ]) is a village in the administrative district of Gmina Wleń, within Lwówek County, Lower Silesian Voivodeship, in south-western Poland.
