= Łupki, Lower Silesian Voivodeship =

Łupki
- Village
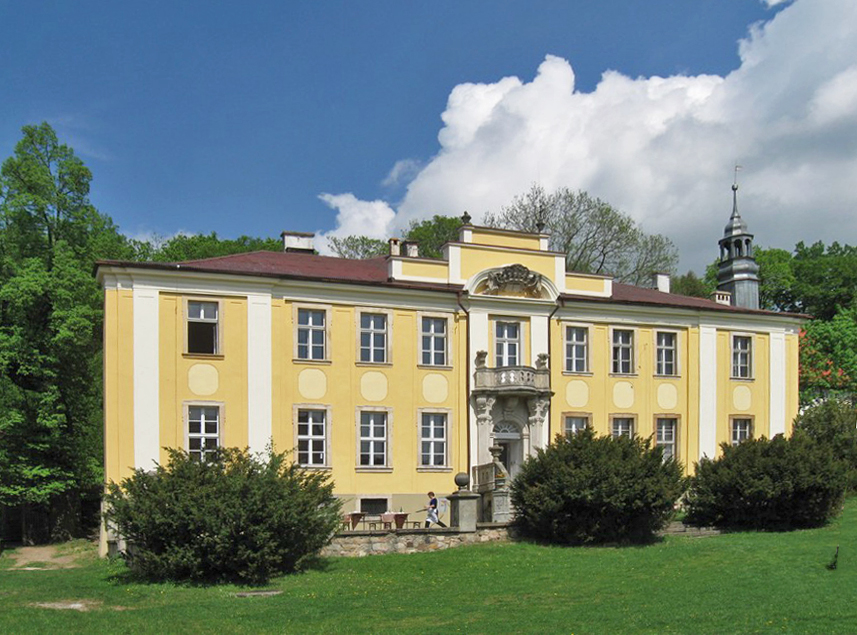
- Lenno Palace in Łupki, Poland

- Location within Poland
- Coordinates: 51°01′19″N 15°38′50″E
- Country: Poland
- Voivodeship: Lower Silesian
- County: Lwówek
- Gmina: Wleń

Łupki [ˈwupki] is a village in the administrative district of Gmina Wleń. It is located within Lwówek County, Lower Silesian Voivodeship, in south-western Poland.
