= Tarczyn, Lower Silesian Voivodeship =

Tarczyn
- Village
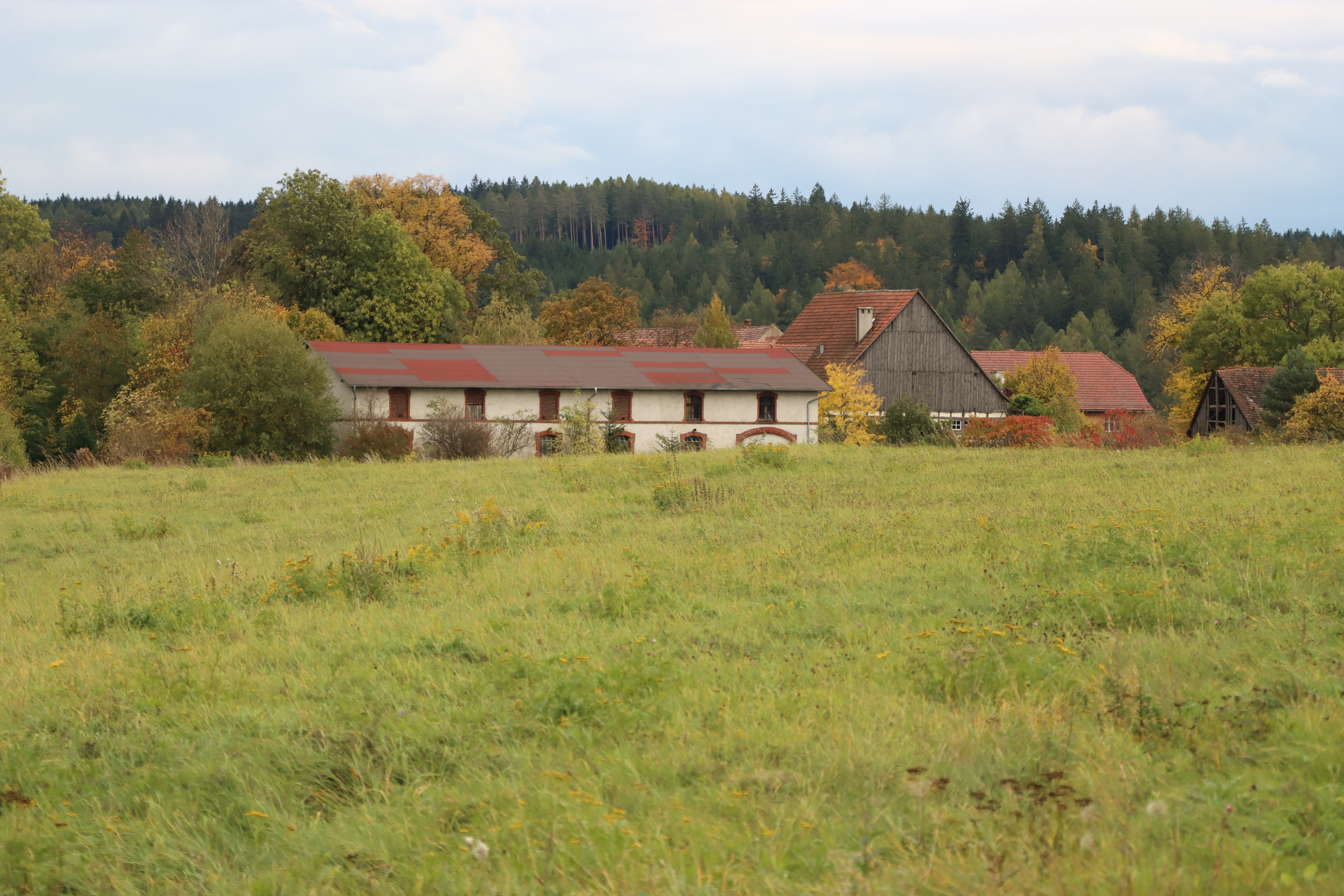
- October 2023 in Tarczyn

- Location within Poland
- Coordinates: 51°0′48″N 15°42′28″E
- Country: Poland
- Voivodeship: Lower Silesian
- County: Lwówek
- Gmina: Wleń

Tarczyn [ˈtart͡ʂɨn] is a village in the administrative district of Gmina Wleń, within Lwówek County, Lower Silesian Voivodeship, in south-western Poland.

== Gallery ==
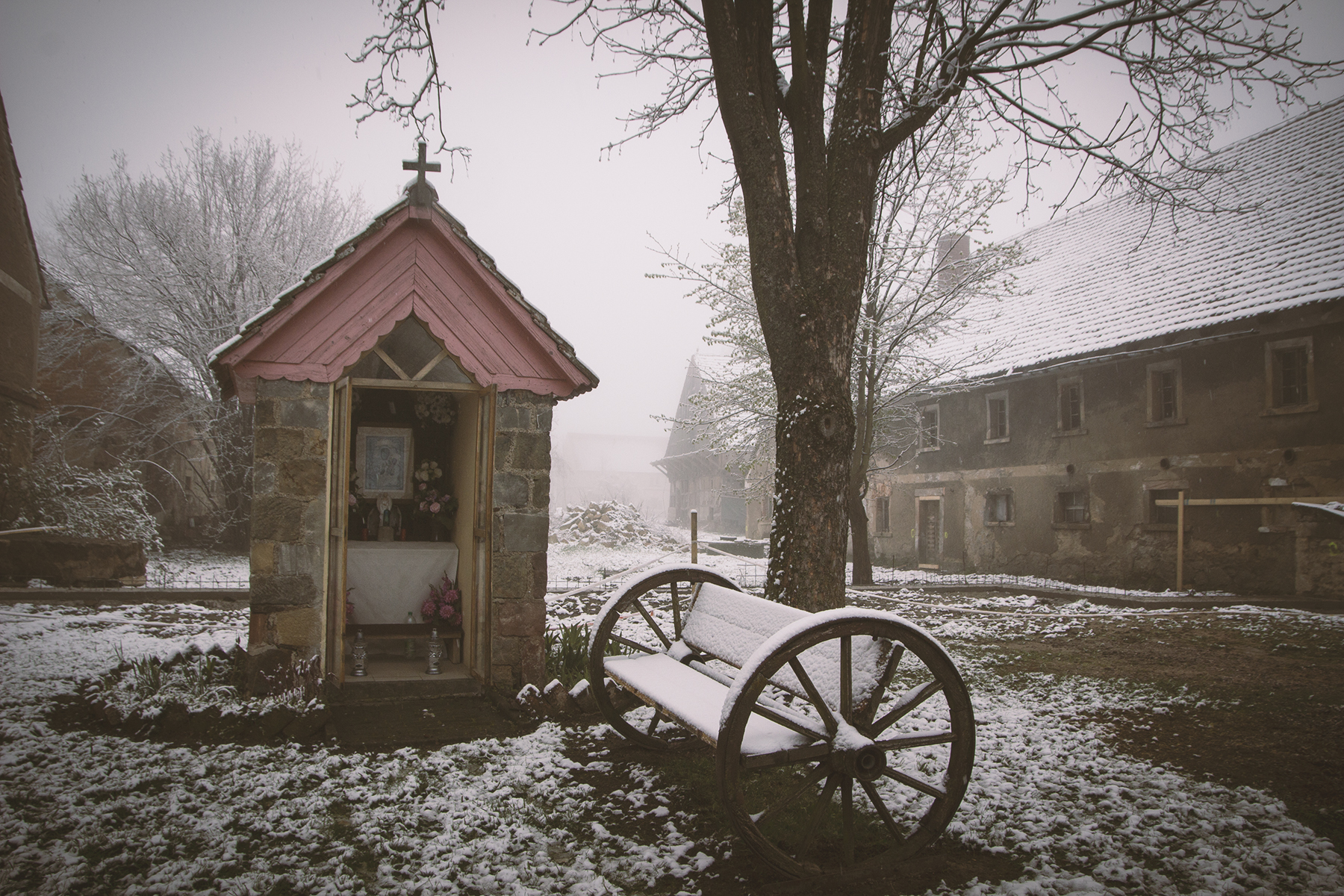
Village chapel in April 2019

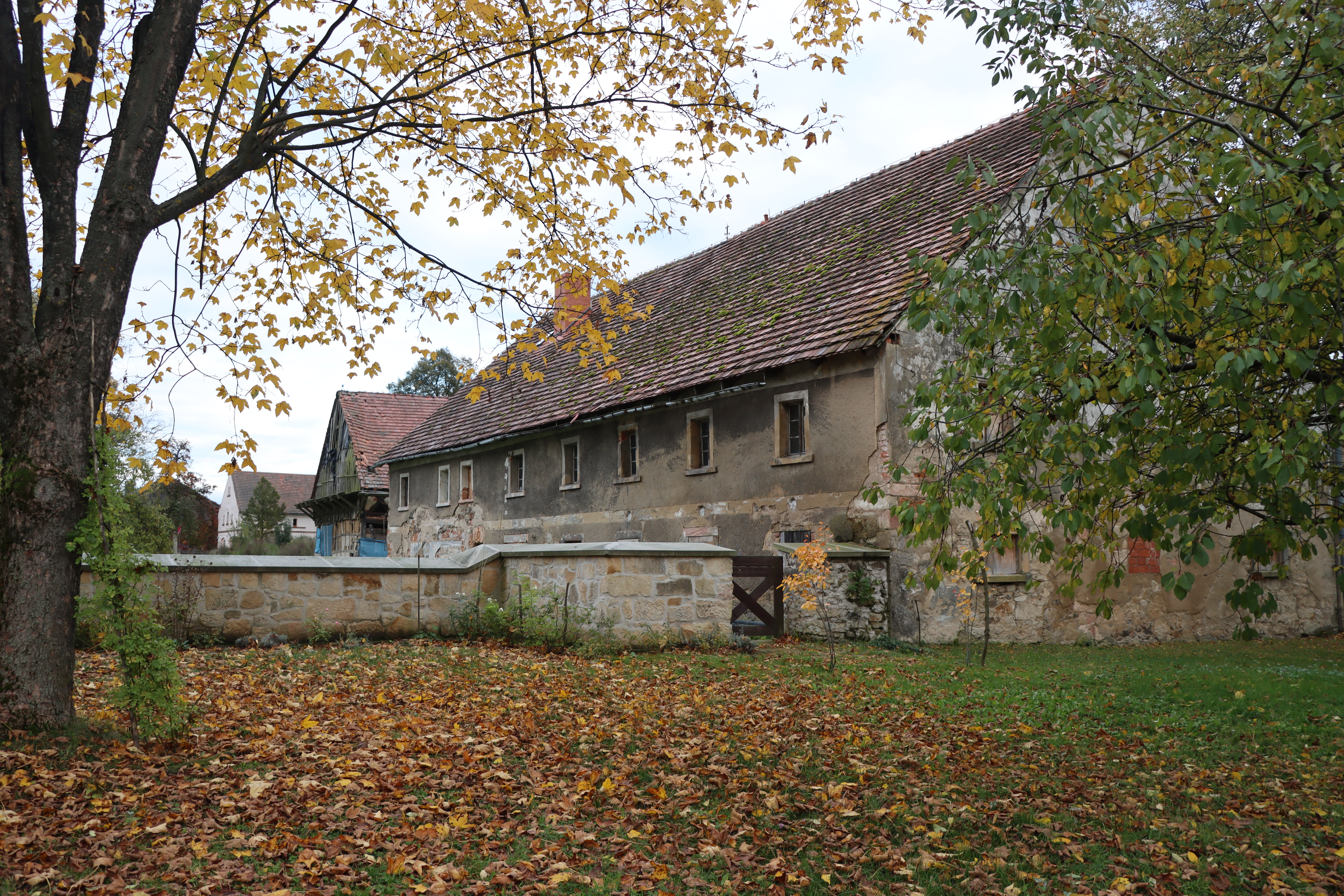
A farm

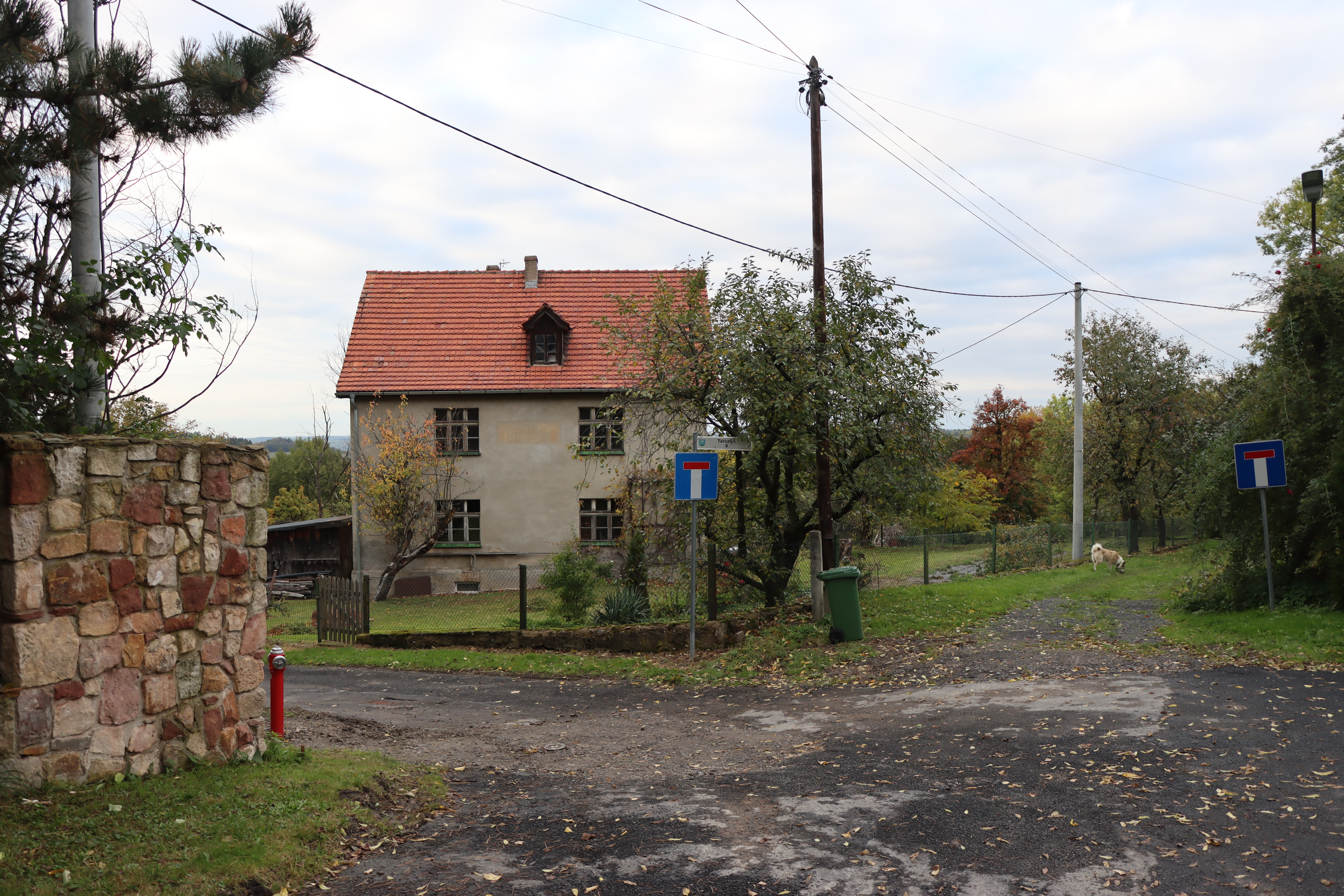
House in the garden
