= Bystrzyca, Lwówek County =

Bystrzyca
- Village
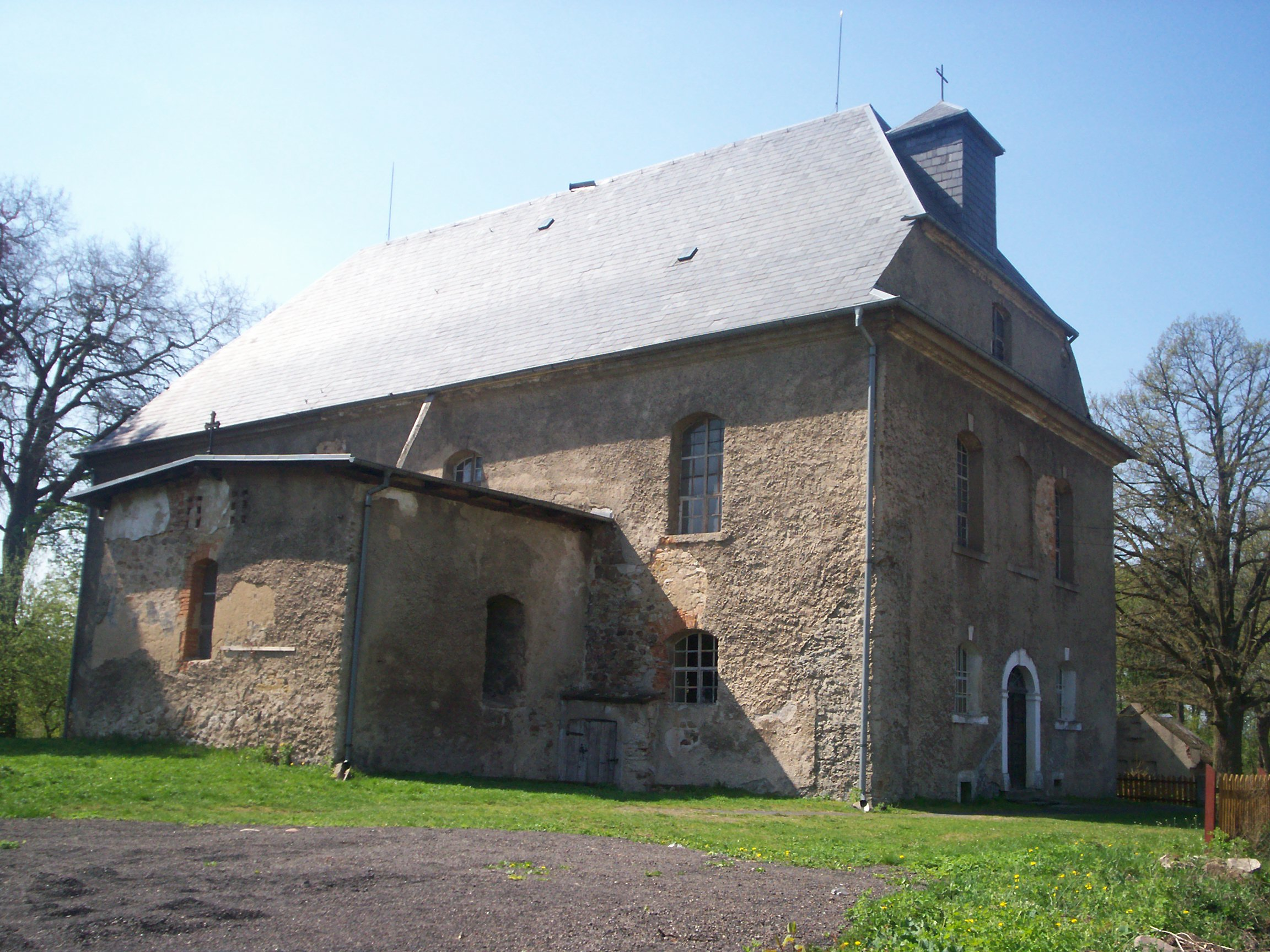
- Our Lady of Lourdes church in Bystrzyca

- Location within Poland
- Coordinates: 51°01′51″N 15°43′21″E
- Country: Poland
- Voivodeship: Lower Silesian
- County: Lwówek
- Gmina: Wleń

Bystrzyca [bɨsˈtʂɨt͡sa] is a village in the administrative district of Gmina Wleń, within Lwówek County, Lower Silesian Voivodeship, in south-western Poland.
