= Modrzewie, Greater Poland Voivodeship =

Modrzewie
- Village
- Location within Poland
- Coordinates: 52°48′45″N 17°25′48″E
- Country: Poland
- Voivodeship: Greater Poland
- County: Wągrowiec
- Gmina: Damasławek

Modrzewie (Polish pronunciation: [mɔdˈʐɛvjɛ]) is a village in the administrative district of Gmina Damasławek, within Wągrowiec County, Greater Poland Voivodeship, in west-central Poland.
