= Strzyżowiec, Lower Silesian Voivodeship =

Strzyżowiec
- Village
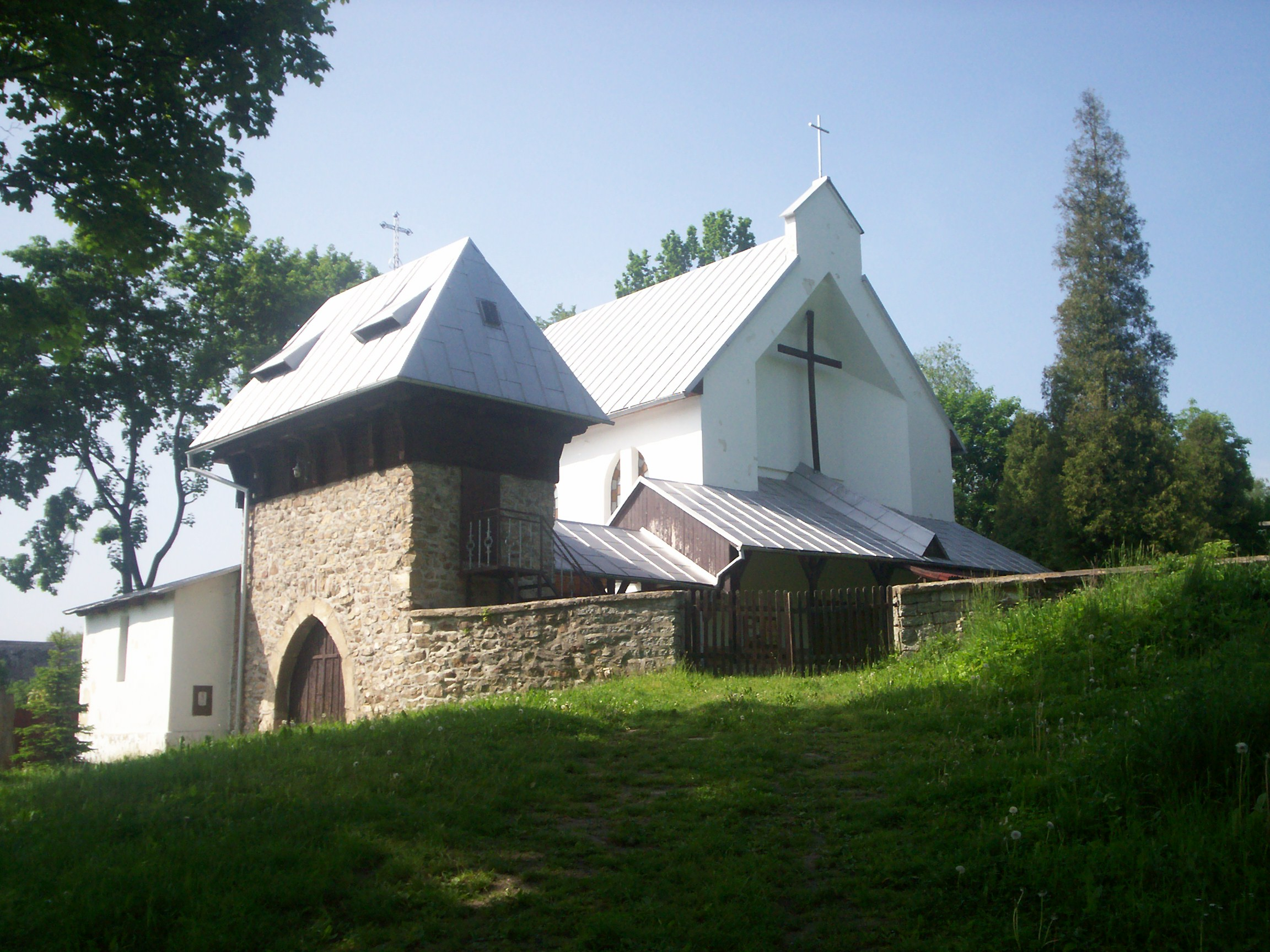
- Church of the exaltation of the Holly Cross

- Location within Poland
- Coordinates: 50°58′20″N 15°40′44″E
- Country: Poland
- Voivodeship: Lower Silesian
- County: Lwówek
- Gmina: Wleń

Strzyżowiec [stʂɨˈʐɔvjɛt͡s] is a village in the administrative district of Gmina Wleń, within Lwówek County, Lower Silesian Voivodeship, in south-western Poland.

== Gallery ==
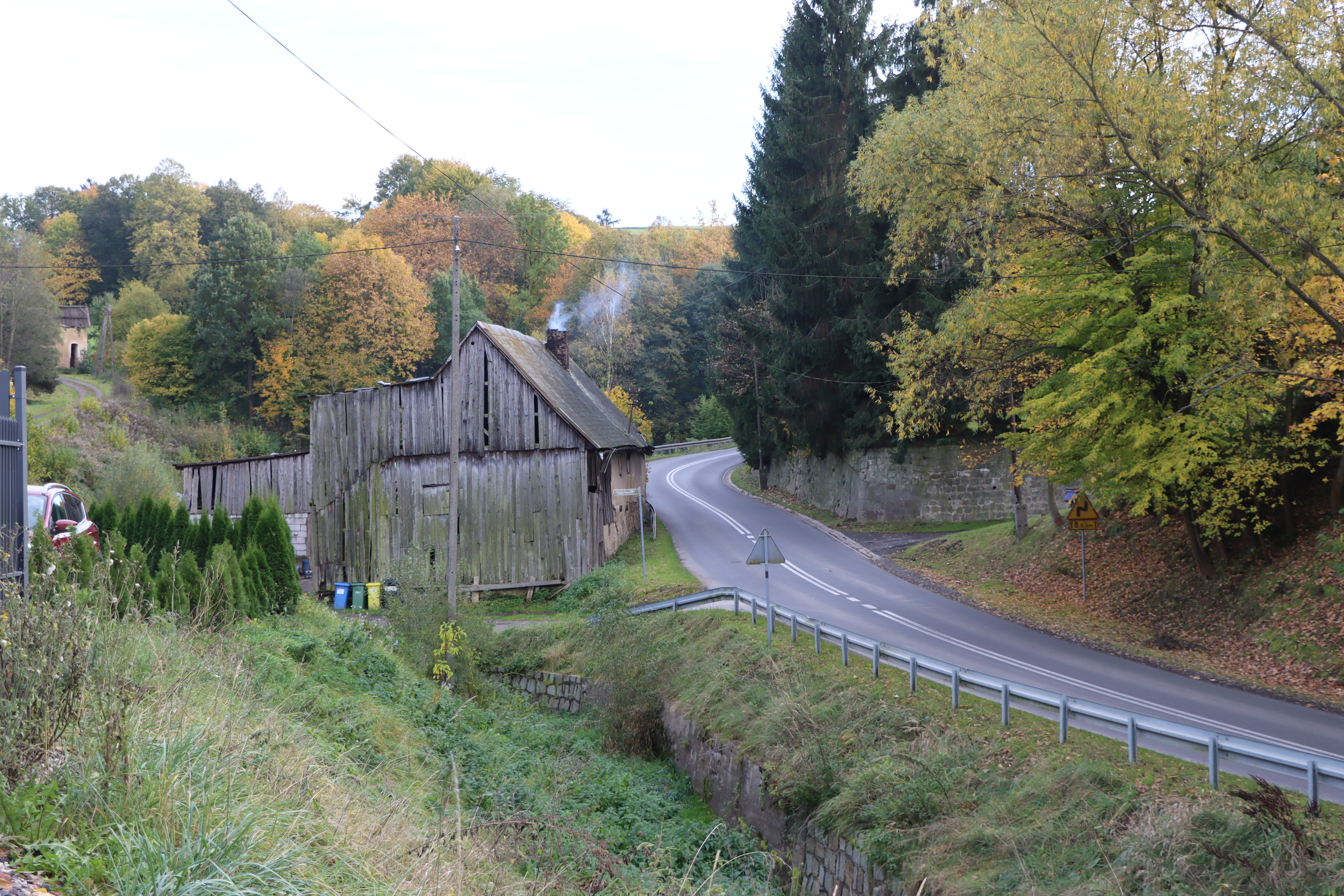
House by the road

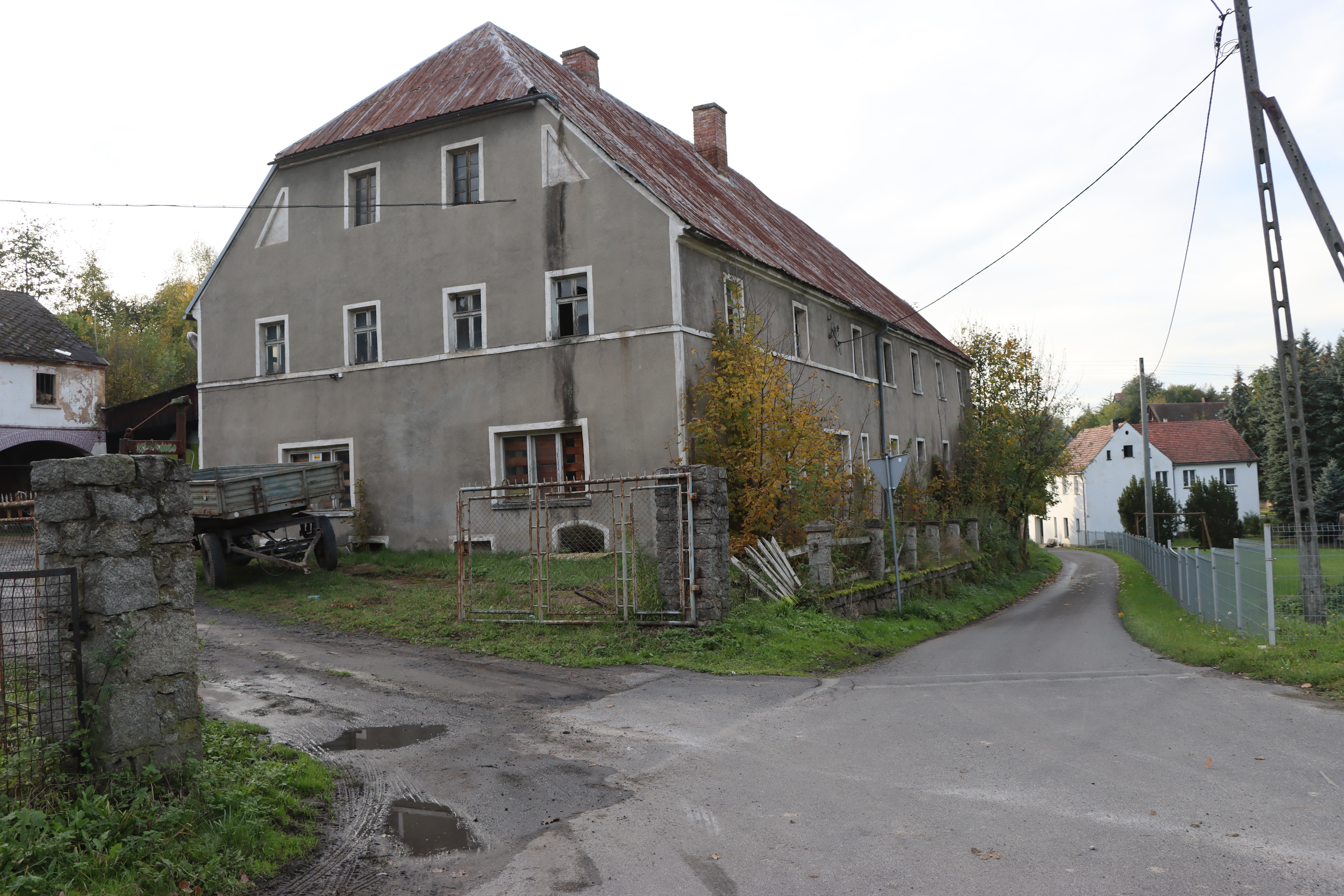
Gray house

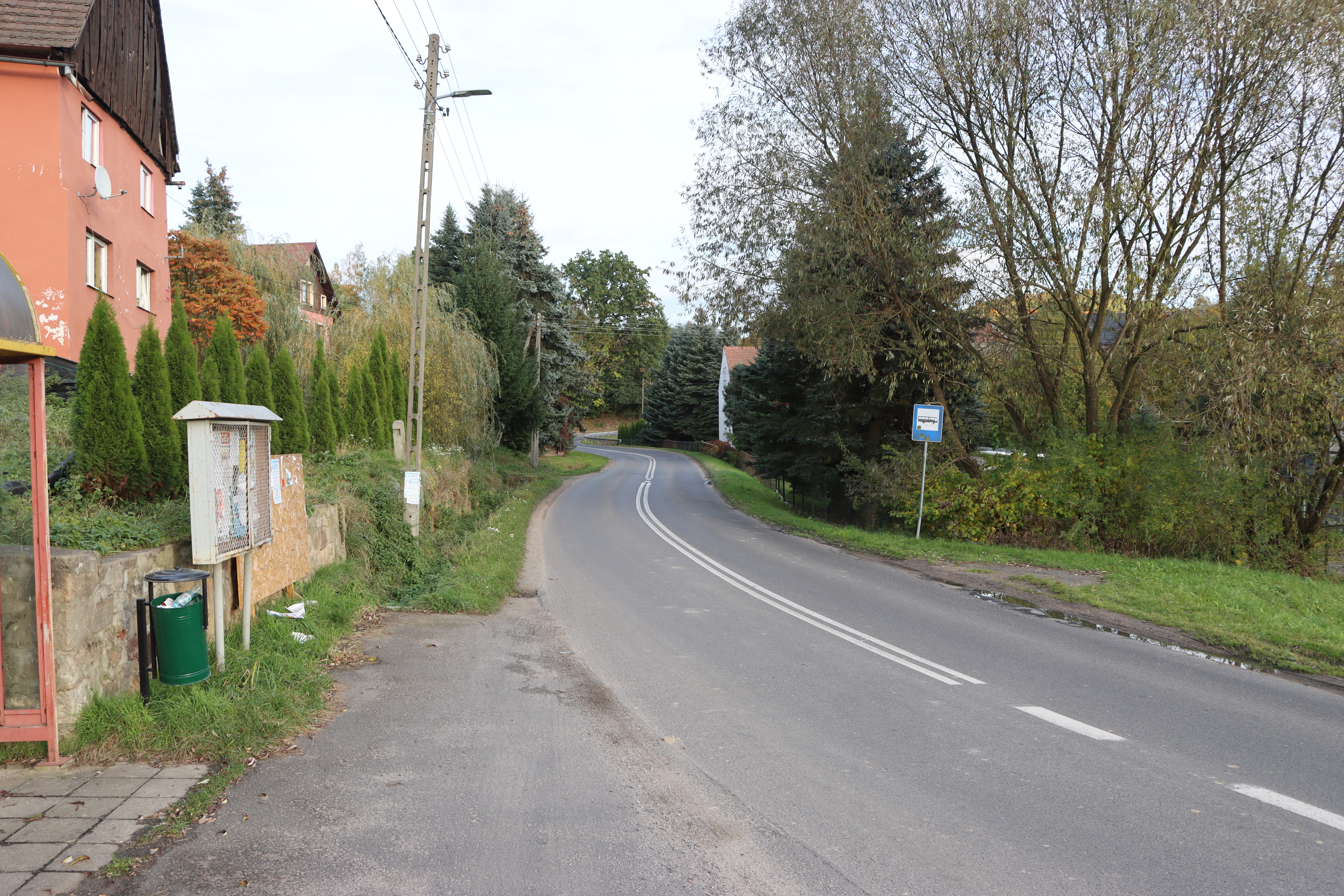
Main road
