= Nielestno =

- Village
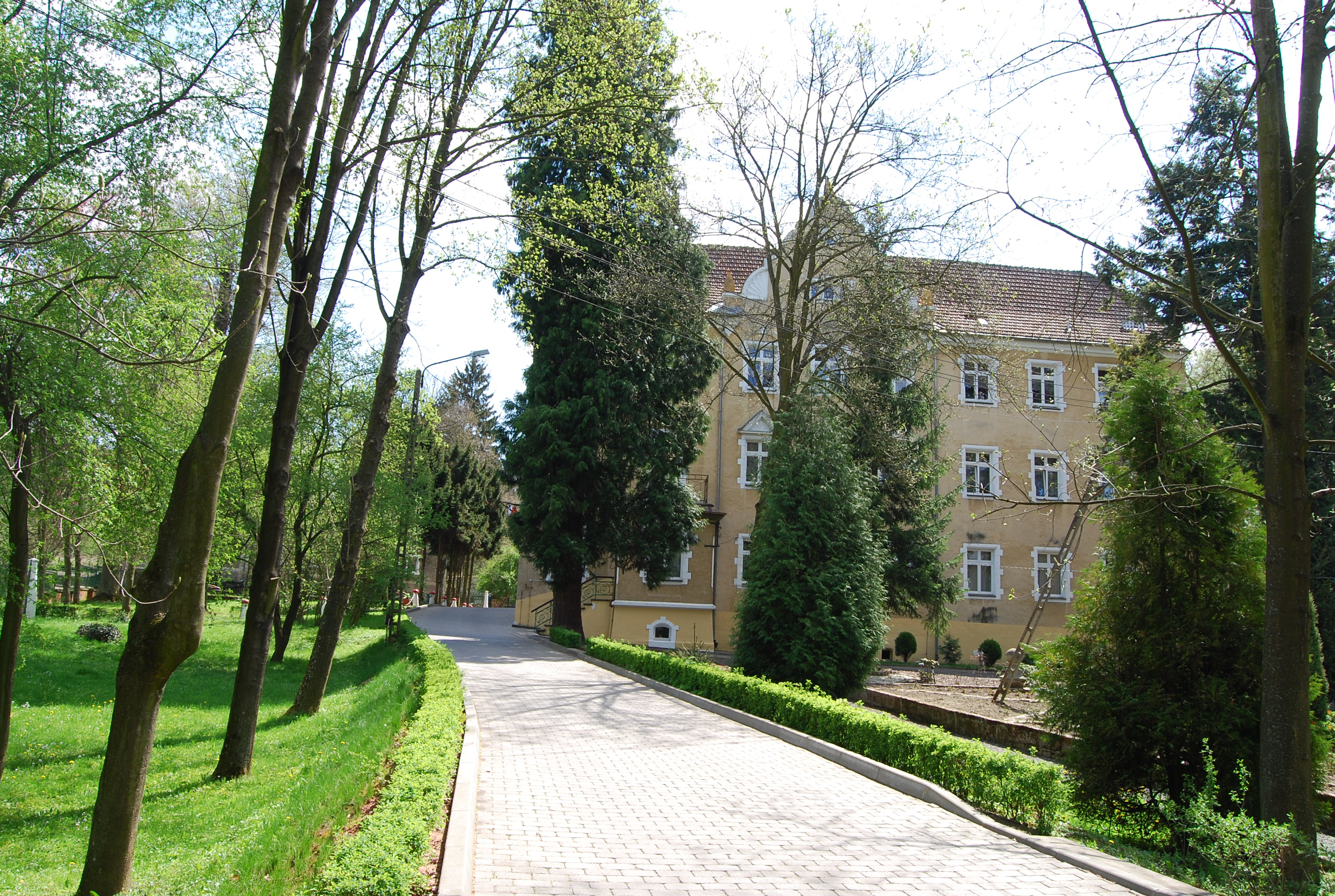
- Chateau

- Location within Poland
- Coordinates: 51°0′N 15°40′E
- Country: Poland
- Voivodeship: Lower Silesian
- County: Lwówek
- Gmina: Wleń

Nielestno [ɲɛˈlɛstnɔ] is a village in the administrative district of Gmina Wleń, within Lwówek County, Lower Silesian Voivodeship, in south-western Poland.

== Gallery ==
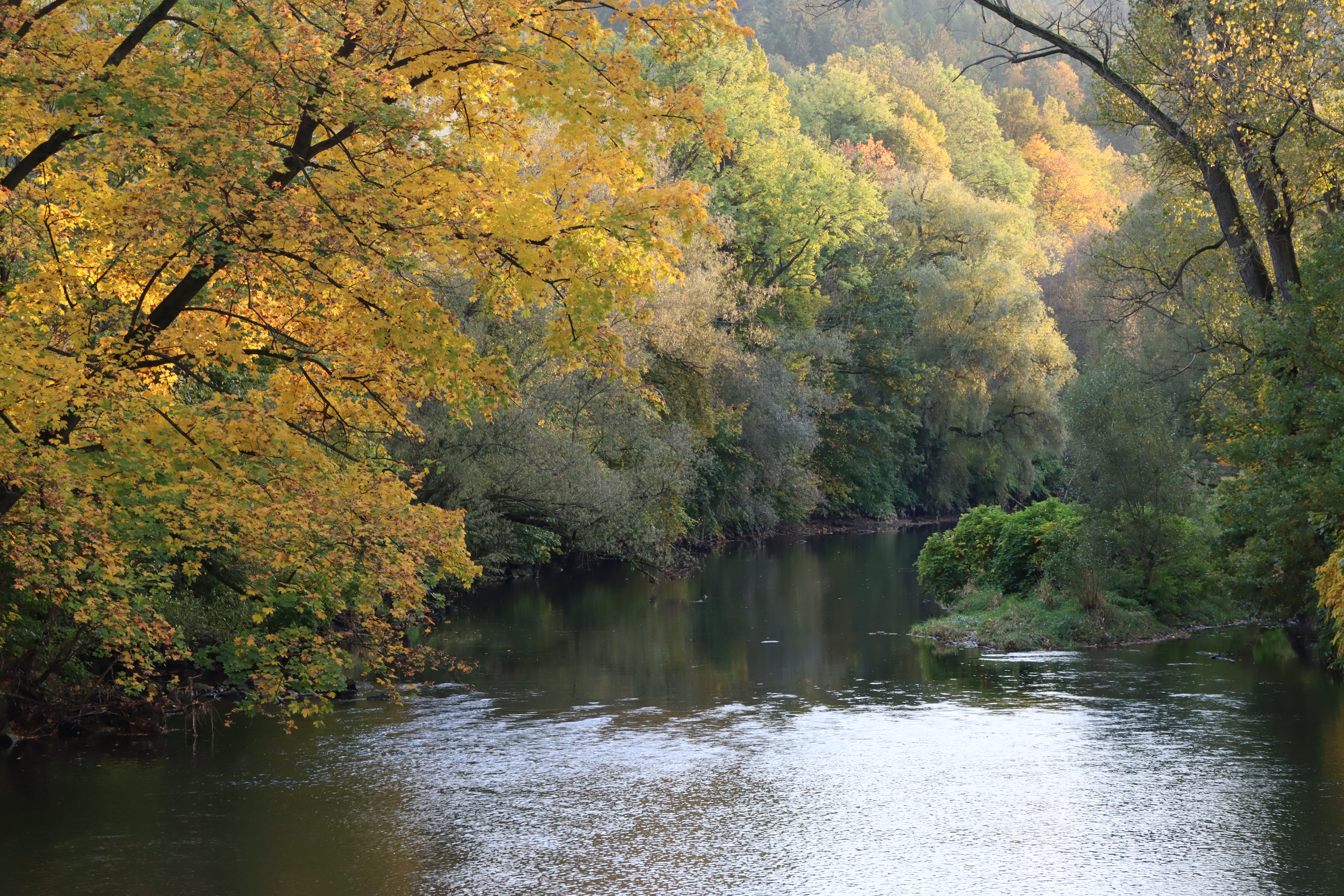
Bóber river

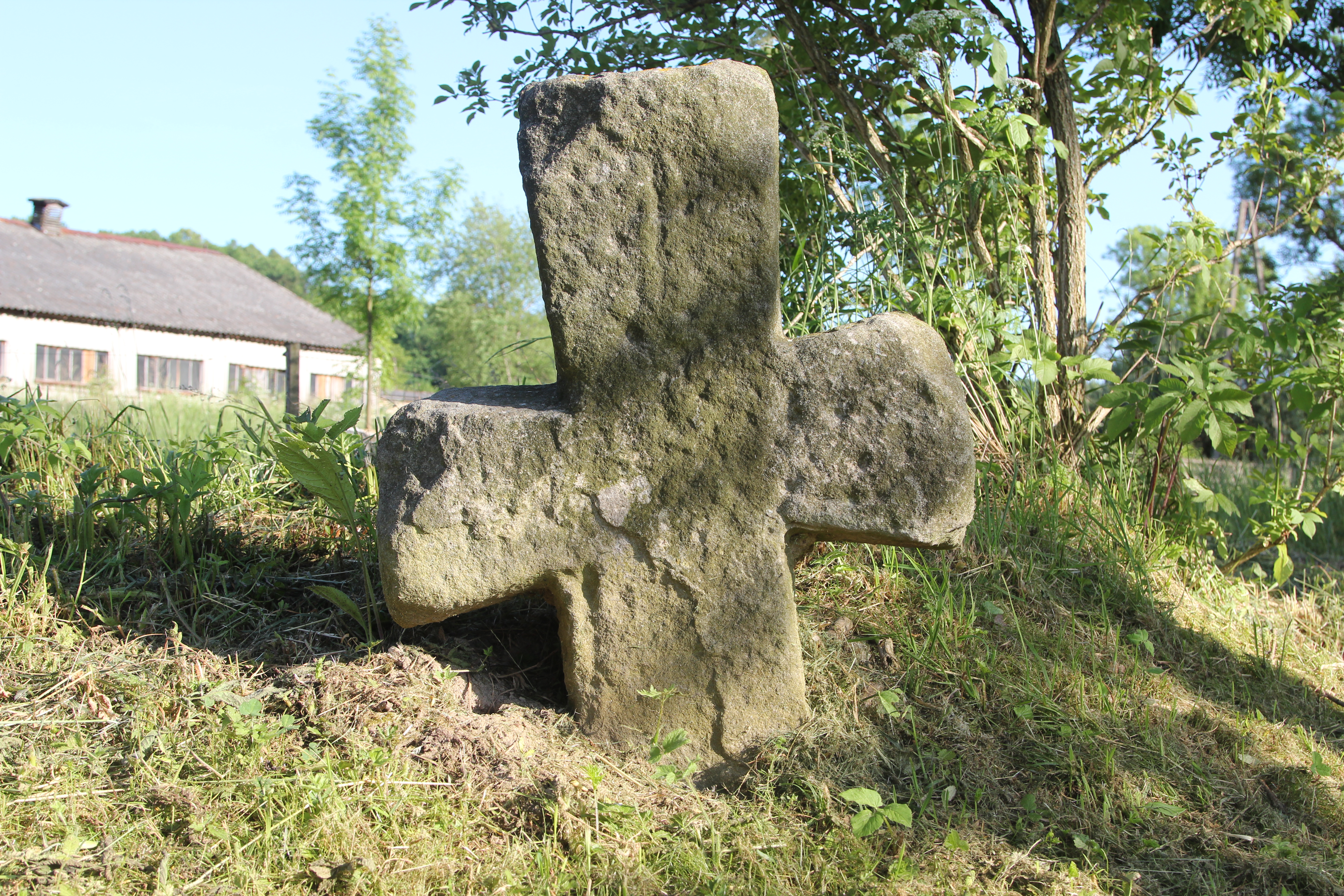
Stone cross

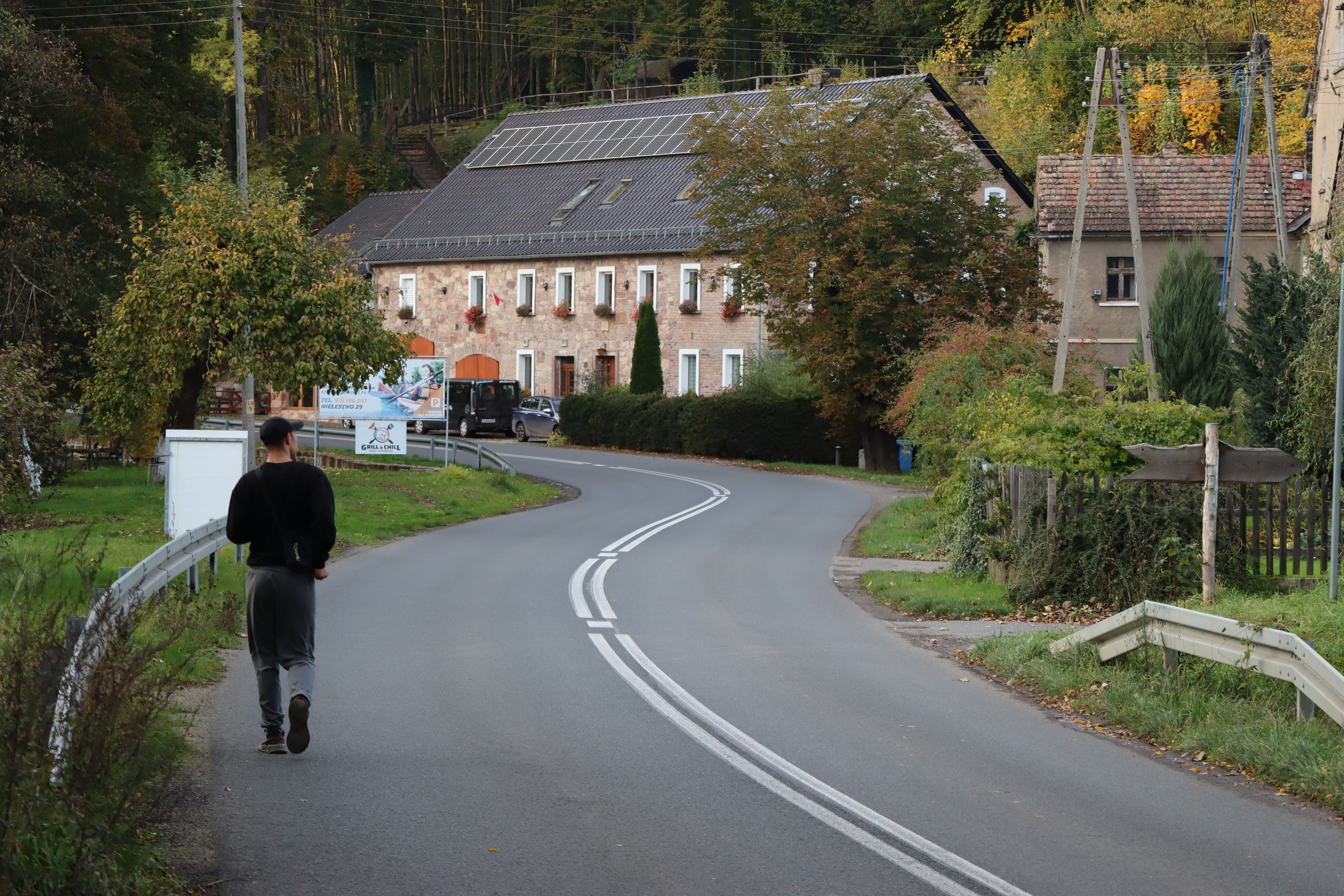
Main road with houses

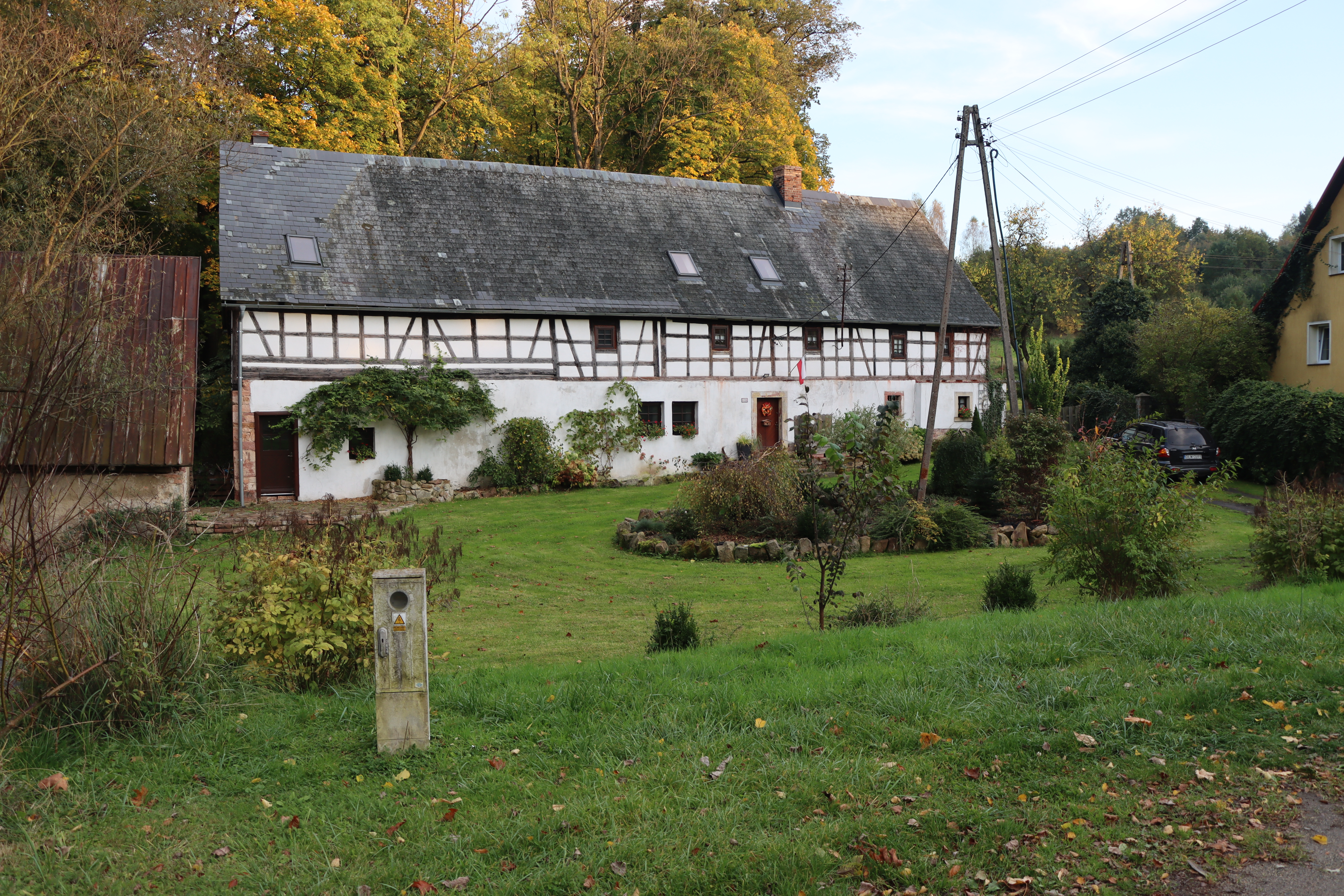
Timber framed house
