= Niemczyn, Greater Poland Voivodeship =

Niemczyn
- Village
- Location within Poland
- Coordinates: 52°51′N 17°24′E
- Country: Poland
- Voivodeship: Greater Poland
- County: Wągrowiec
- Gmina: Damasławek

Niemczyn [ˈɲɛmt͡ʂɨn] is a village in the administrative district of Gmina Damasławek, within Wągrowiec County, Greater Poland Voivodeship, in west-central Poland.
