= Tresckow =

See also Treskow (noble family) and Tresckow, Pennsylvania

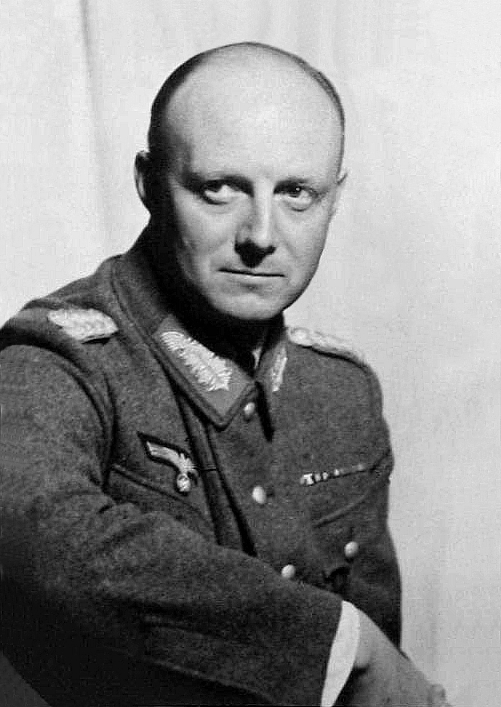
Henning von Tresckow

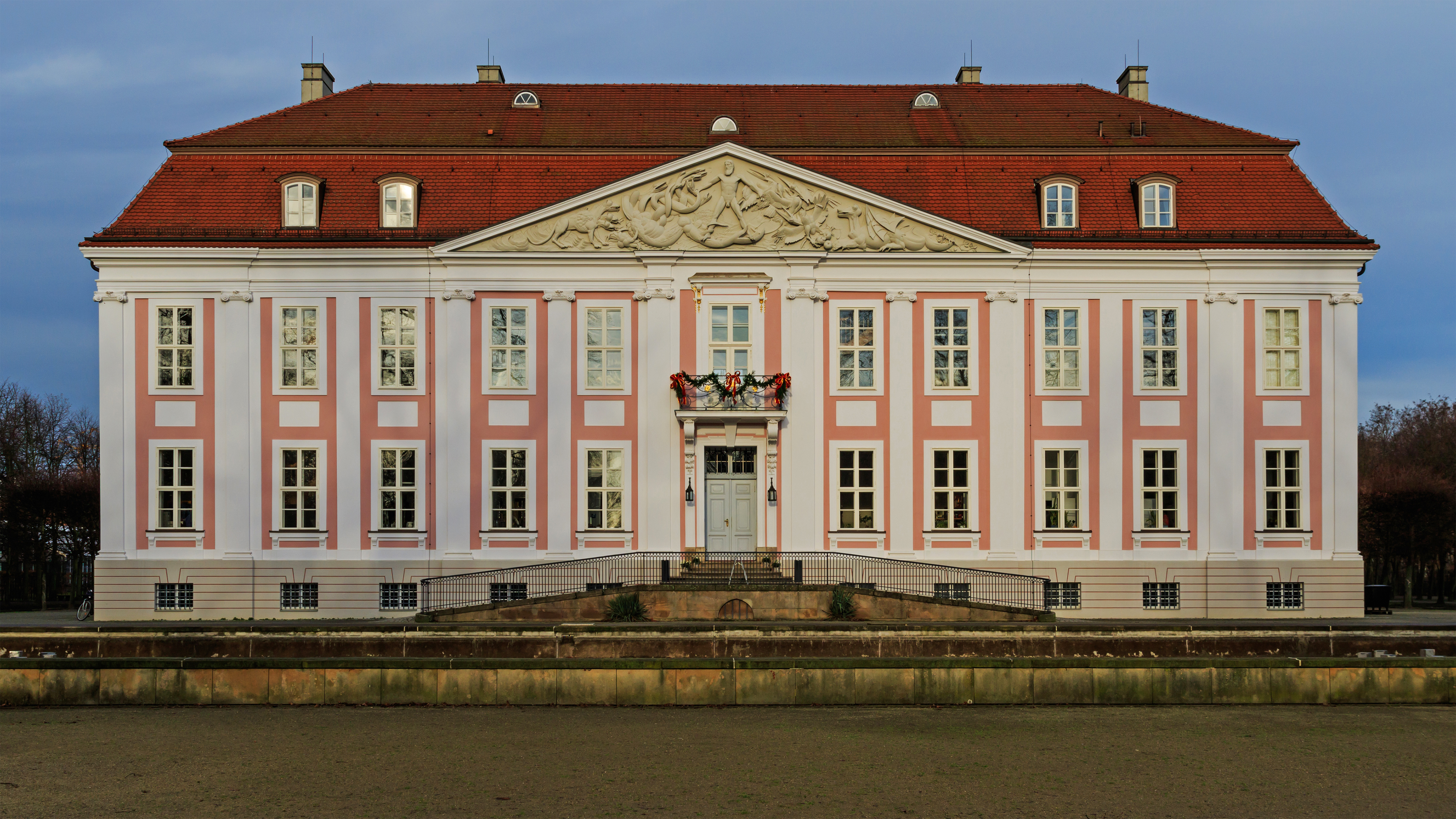
Friedrichsfelde Palace, owned by the Treskow branch from 1816

Tresckow is a German aristocratic family originating from Mark Brandenburg and belonging to the German nobility dating back to the middle ages (German: Uradel). A prominent branch of the family is known as Treskow and acquired substantial land and wealth in the 18th and 19th century.

The family was first mentioned in 1336, when Hinricus Treskowe, Lord of Buckow, was mentioned.

General and anti-Nazi conspirator Henning von Tresckow was one of the prime movers behind what led to the 20 July plot to assassinate Hitler.

== Notable members ==
=== von Tresckow ===
- Egon von Tresckow (1907–1952)
- Gerd von Tresckow (1899–1944)
- Henning von Tresckow (1901–1944)
- Joachim Christian von Tresckow (1698–1762)
- Hermann von Tresckow (1818–1900)
- Udo von Tresckow (1808–1885)

=== von Treskow ===
See also Treskow (noble family)

- Carl von Treskow (1819–1882)
- Christian von Treskow (born 1968)
- Ernst Heinrich von Treskow (1844–1915)
- Johann Karl Sigismund von Treskow (1864–1945)
- Julius von Treskow (1818–1894)
- Nikolai de Treskow (born 1968)
- Sigmund Otto Joseph von Treskow (1756–1825)

== Imitation of name and coat of arms ==
In the 19th century, a Dano-Norwegian family named Treschow, which is unrelated to the Tresckow family, adopted a coat of arms based upon that of the German Tresckow family. The name of the Dano-Norwegian family has a different etymology, being a corruption of the original Træskomager, meaning "wooden shoe-maker" in Danish/Norwegian.
