= Tierpark Berlin =

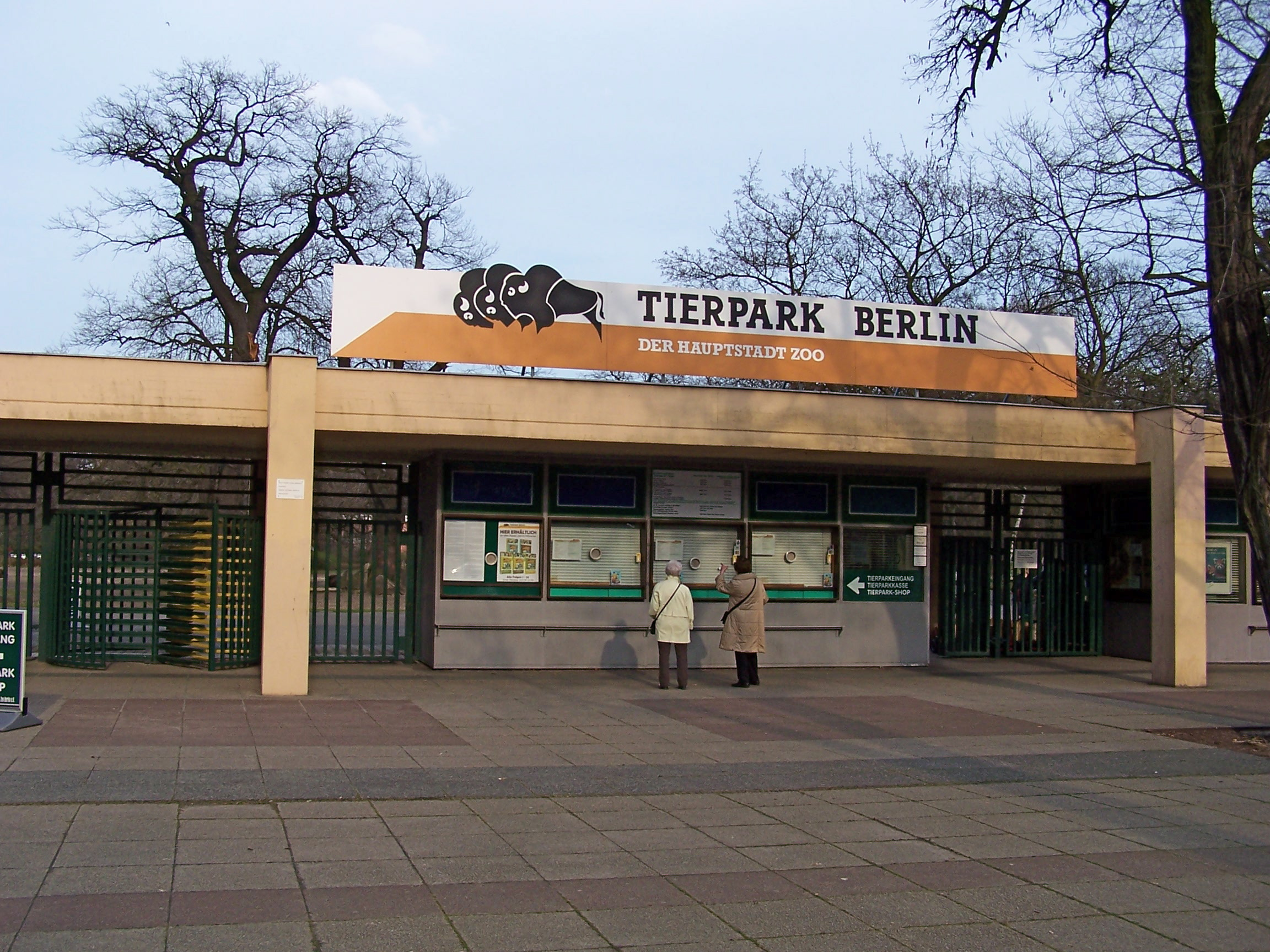
- Main entrance
- Interactive map of Tierpark Berlin
- 52°30′10″N 13°31′49″E
- Date opened: 1955
- Location: Berlin, Germany
- Land area: 160 hectares (400 acres)
- No. of animals: 7,250 (December 2013)
- No. of species: 846 (December 2013)
- Annual visitors: 1,035,899 (2013)
- Memberships: EAZA
- Website: www.tierpark-berlin.de/en/

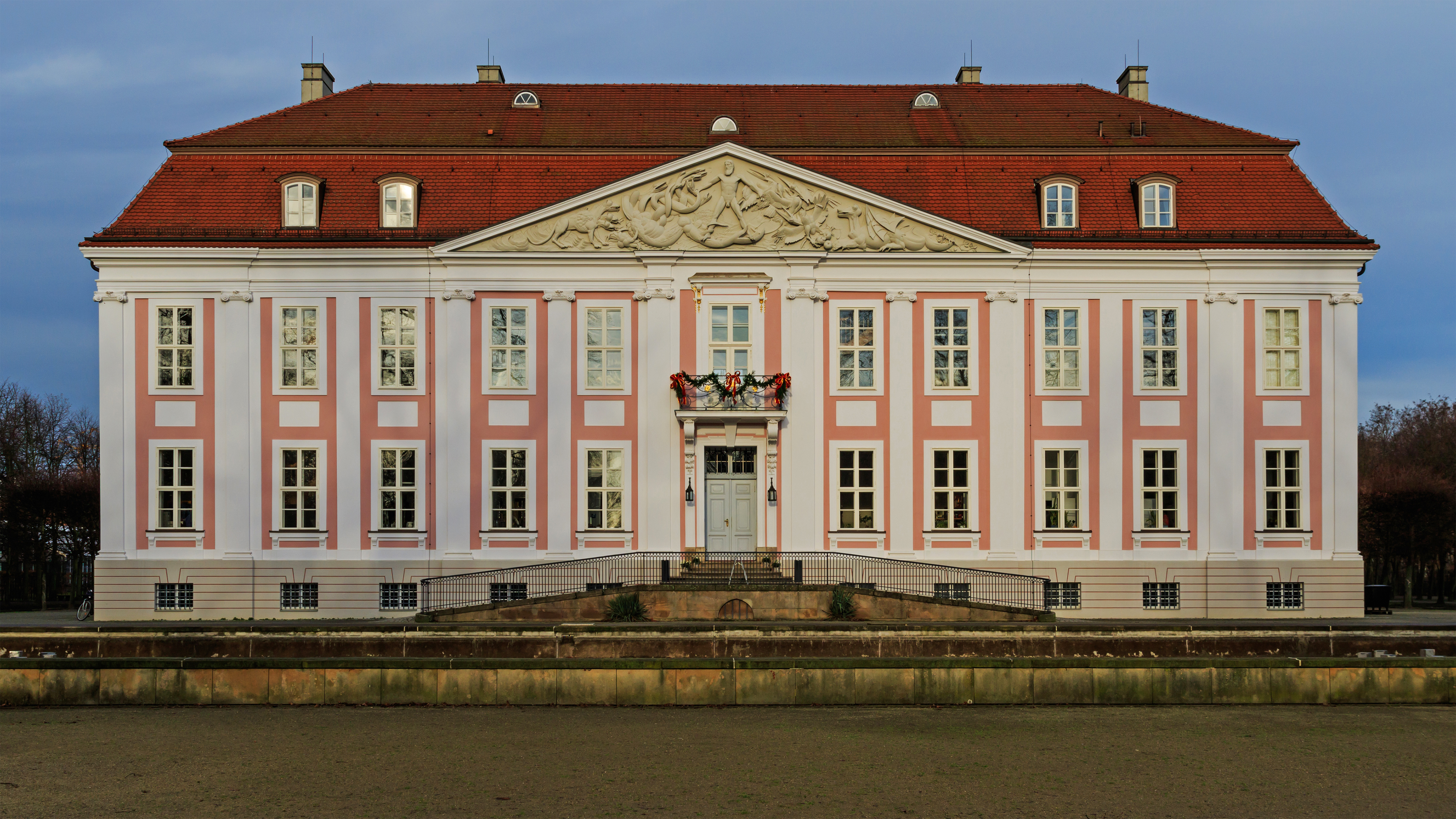
Friedrichsfelde Palace, at the heart of the zoo

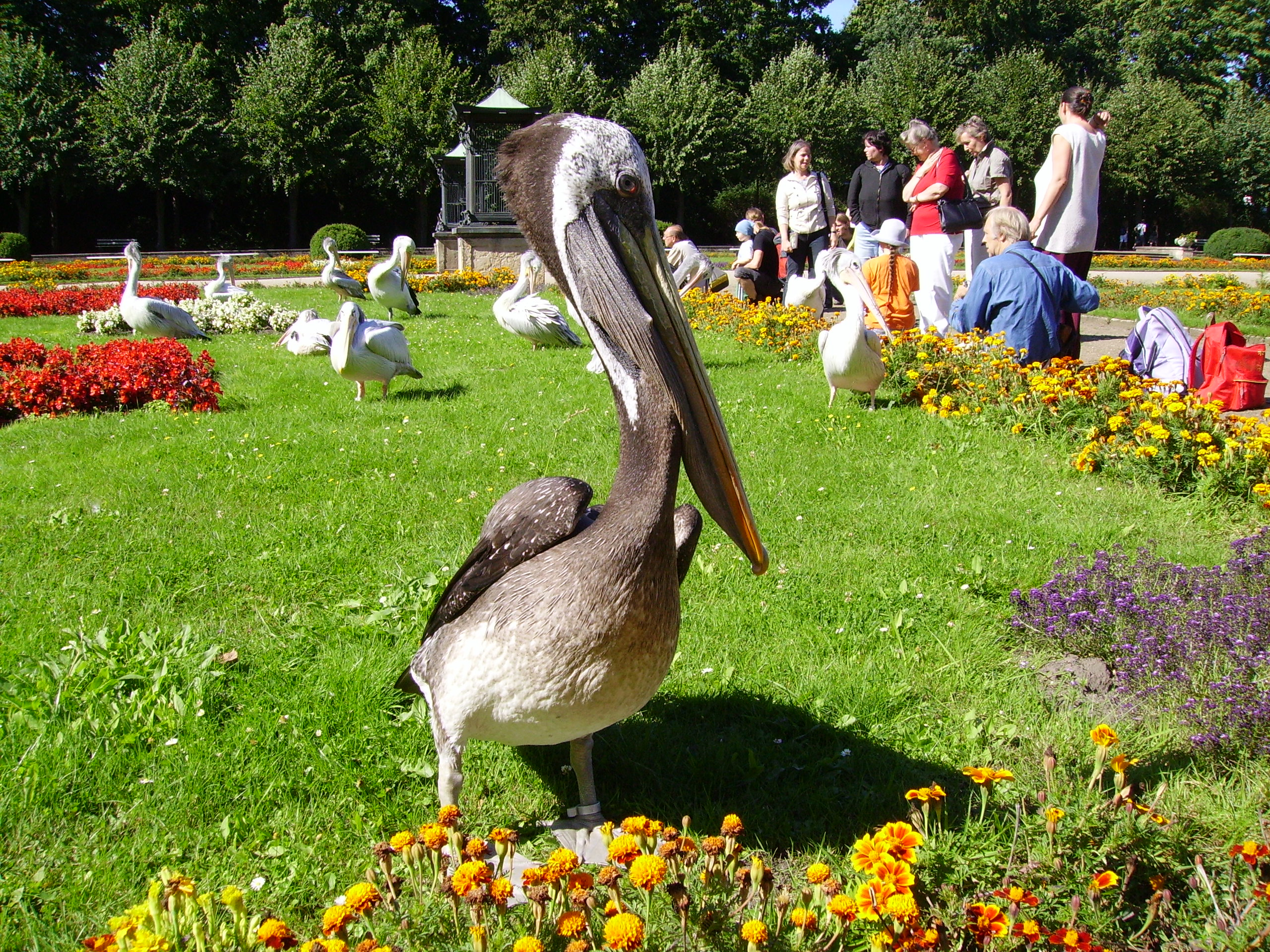
Pelicans in the zoo

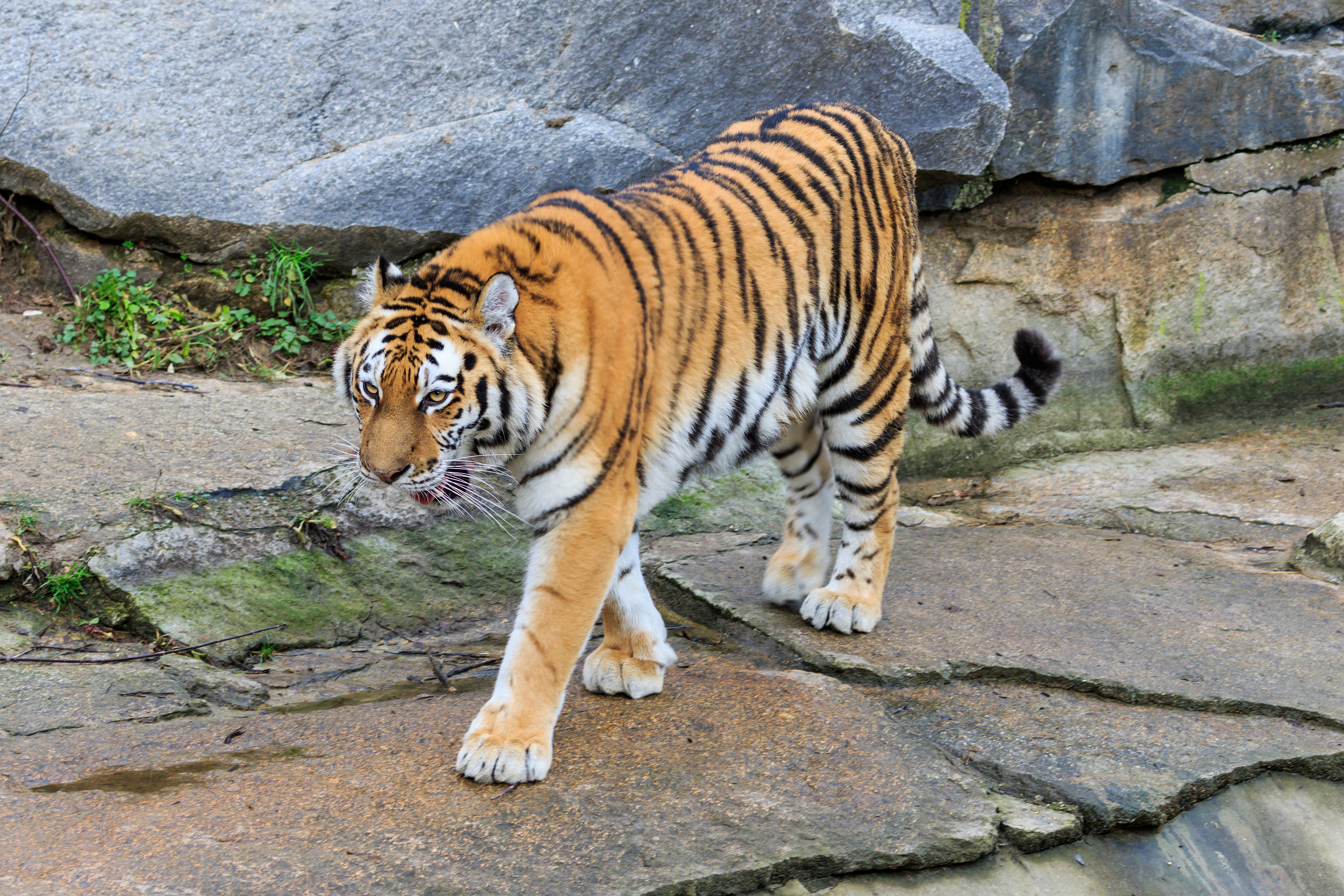
Siberian tiger in the zoo

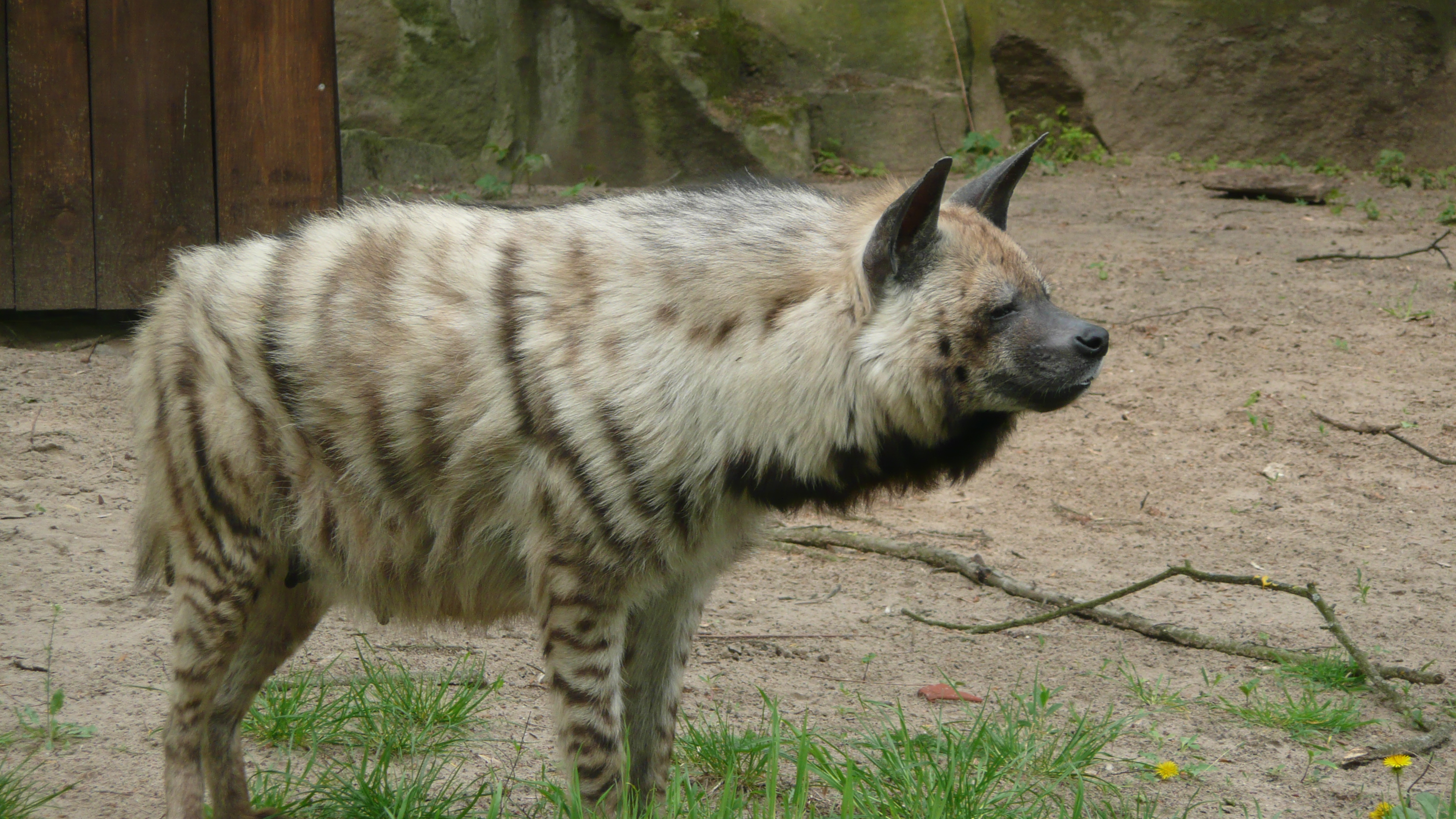
Striped hyena in the zoo

The Tierpark Berlin is one of two zoos located in Berlin, Germany. It was founded in 1955 and is located in Friedrichsfelde on the former grounds of Friedrichsfelde Palace, which is situated within the zoo. As of 31 December 2013, the zoo houses 7,250 animals from 846 species, in an area of 160 hectares (400 acres). Tierpark Berlin also features two public exhibits free of charge, one being the Bärenschaufenster (Bear Show Window) for American black bears. The park is also home to the Treskow family's historic family burial ground.

Tierpark Berlin is a member of the European Association of Zoos and Aquaria (EAZA) and participates in about 120 breeding programmes (EEP). It maintains the international studbooks for endangered species of deer and wild asses of Asia and Africa as well as the European studbook for little pied cormorants. The zoo further participates in attempts of reintroducing species to areas where they have become endangered or extinct and it financially supports selected in situ projects for the protection of natural habitats.

== History ==
Founded in 1955, it was originally established as a counterpart of the famous Berlin Zoological Garden, which was located in what was then West Berlin and soon to be out of reach for residents of the former eastern sector. The initial bear enclosures featured natural rocks and artificial waterfalls, while large paddocks surrounded by old trees and canals were designed for camels and bison. In the following years and decades, other exhibits, aviaries, and larger buildings were added to accommodate a selection of carnivores, ungulates, reptiles and birds, as well as primates, including great apes. A large building for both African and Asian elephants and other pachyderms was completed just a few years before East and West Berlin were reunited.

Despite serious discussions dealing with a possible closure of the park, the 1990s saw a process of replacing improvised or damaged structures as well as expanding the zoo with new areas for African ungulates and primates, as well as species from alpine regions of Asia and Europe. At the same time, Berlin Tierpark, which now was designated to complement Berlin Zoological Garden, had to give up some species such as great apes. In recent years, the zoo has become famous for its successful elephant breeding program. It is also one of the few zoos in Western Europe that houses various large herds of ungulates, including some rarely kept species such as muskoxen and takin. It has the most diverse collection of hoofed mammals in Europe. Due to economic challenges, Berlin Tierpark recently issued a new master plan which identifies a number of potential attractions and revenues, though the funding for the proposed projects is not clear.

Tierpark Berlin has faced several controversies in the past, including allegations in 2008 by Green Party politician Claudia Hämmerling that it illegally sold animals, such as a pygmy hippopotamus and several Asiatic black bears, for slaughter under its former director Bernhard Blaszkiewitz (also the director of the Berlin Zoo). The same year, Blaszkiewitz faced criticism for breaking the necks of several feral domestic housecat kittens at the Berlin Zoo. A polar bear cub born in 2018 was found to be the offspring of bears who were brother and sister, accidentally housed together due to a studbook error.

== Statistics ==
Animals	Number	Species
Mammals	1,283	199
Birds	2,380	356
Reptiles	508	103
Amphibians	55	3
Fish	938	106
Invertebrates	2,086	79
Total (2013)	7,250	846

== Directors ==
The first director (1955–1990) of the Tierpark Berlin-Friedrichsfelde, Heinrich Dathe, was a well-known scientist. He edited five scentitific journals and wrote more than 1,000 scientific and popular papers and books. He was succeeded by Bernhard Blaszkiewitz.

== See also ==
- List of zoos in Germany
