= Treskow family burial ground (Berlin) =

Historic landmark in Berlin, Germany

Coordinates: 52°29′51″N 13°31′36″E

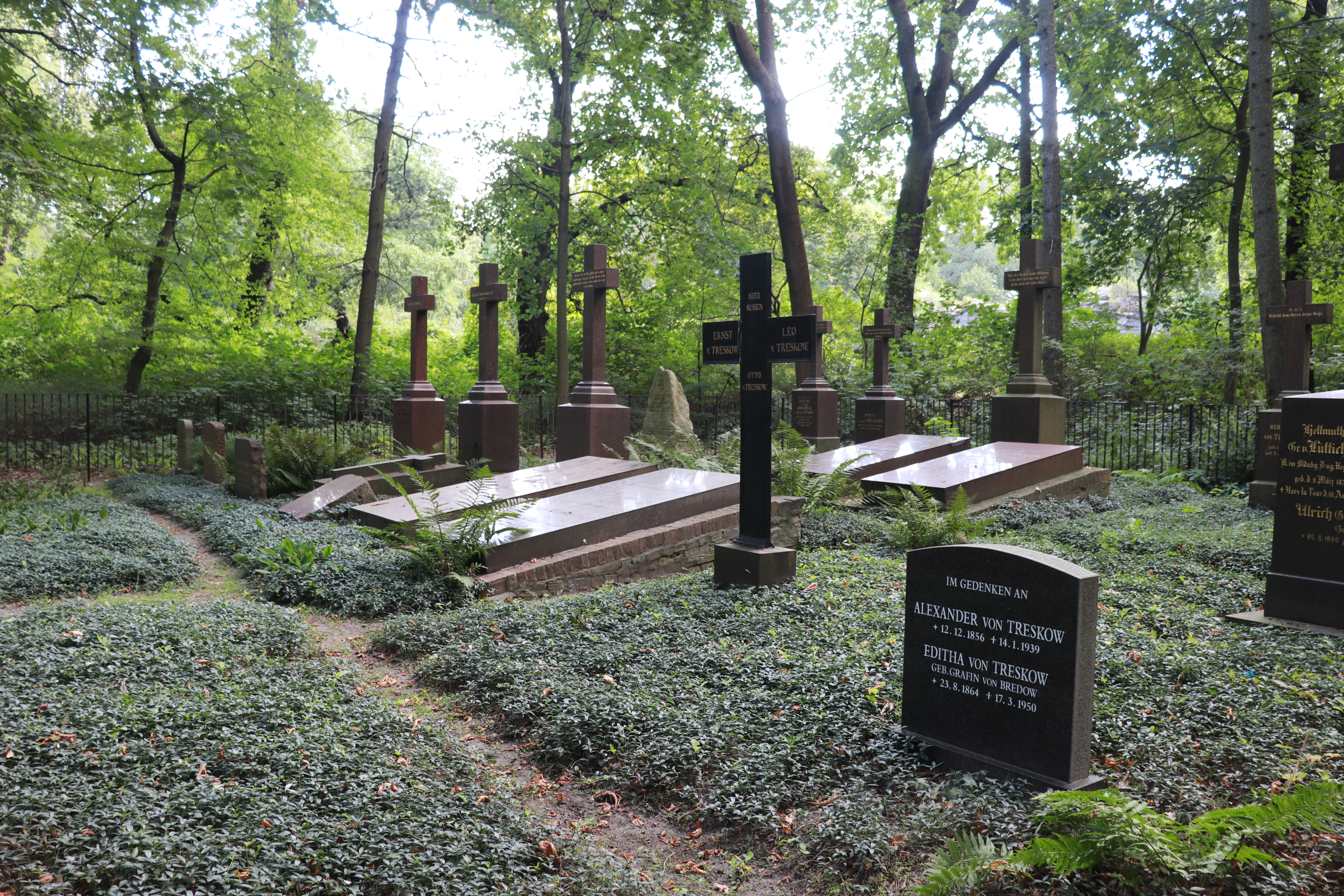
Treskow family burial ground

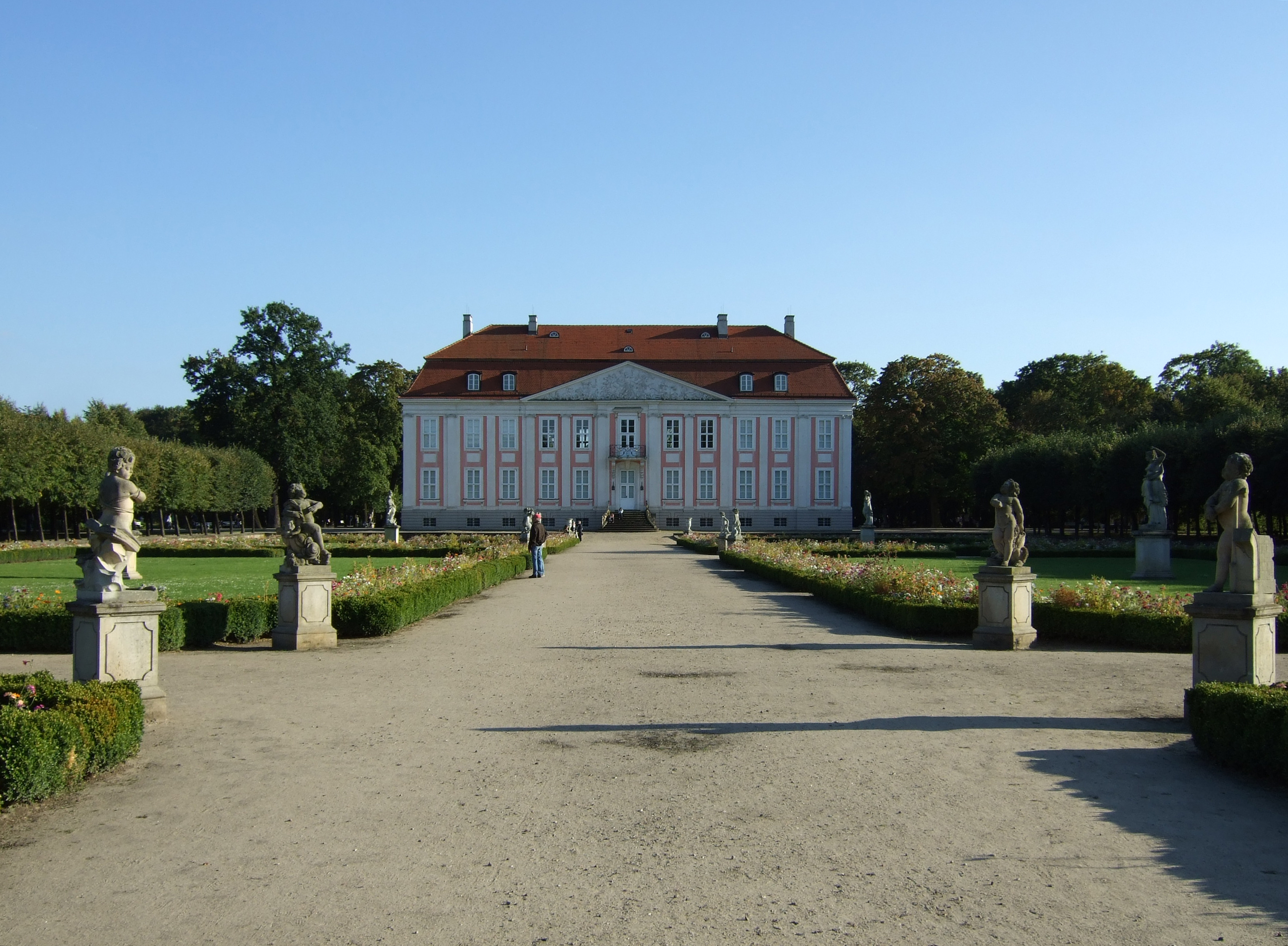
Friedrichsfelde Palace

The Treskow family burial ground (German: Erbbegräbnisstätte der Familie von Treskow) is a historic landmark in Berlin, Germany. It was established in 1821 by Carl Sigismund von Treskow for his family, a branch of the von Treskow noble family, and is located in the park of Friedrichsfelde Palace (now part of the Tierpark Berlin) in the Friedrichsfelde district.

== History ==
As founder of the Treskow family's Friedrichsfelde branch, Carl von Treskow established the hereditary burial ground for his first son Leo von Treskow, who died at just three months old. Carl, as well as his wife Julie, his children, grandchildren as well as their spouses were buried at the cemetery. The burial ground is also the final resting place of Manfred von Sydow, descendant of Wilhelm von Humboldt and director of Junkers, who had married Ursula von Treskow at the estate in 1935. The cemetery is also home to three memorials to the families of the Counts of Lüttichau, who had married into the family previously.

The cemetery was extensively renovated in 2015 and re-opened in 2015 to celebrate the district of Friedrichsfelde's 750th anniversary.
