= Treskow family =

German noble family

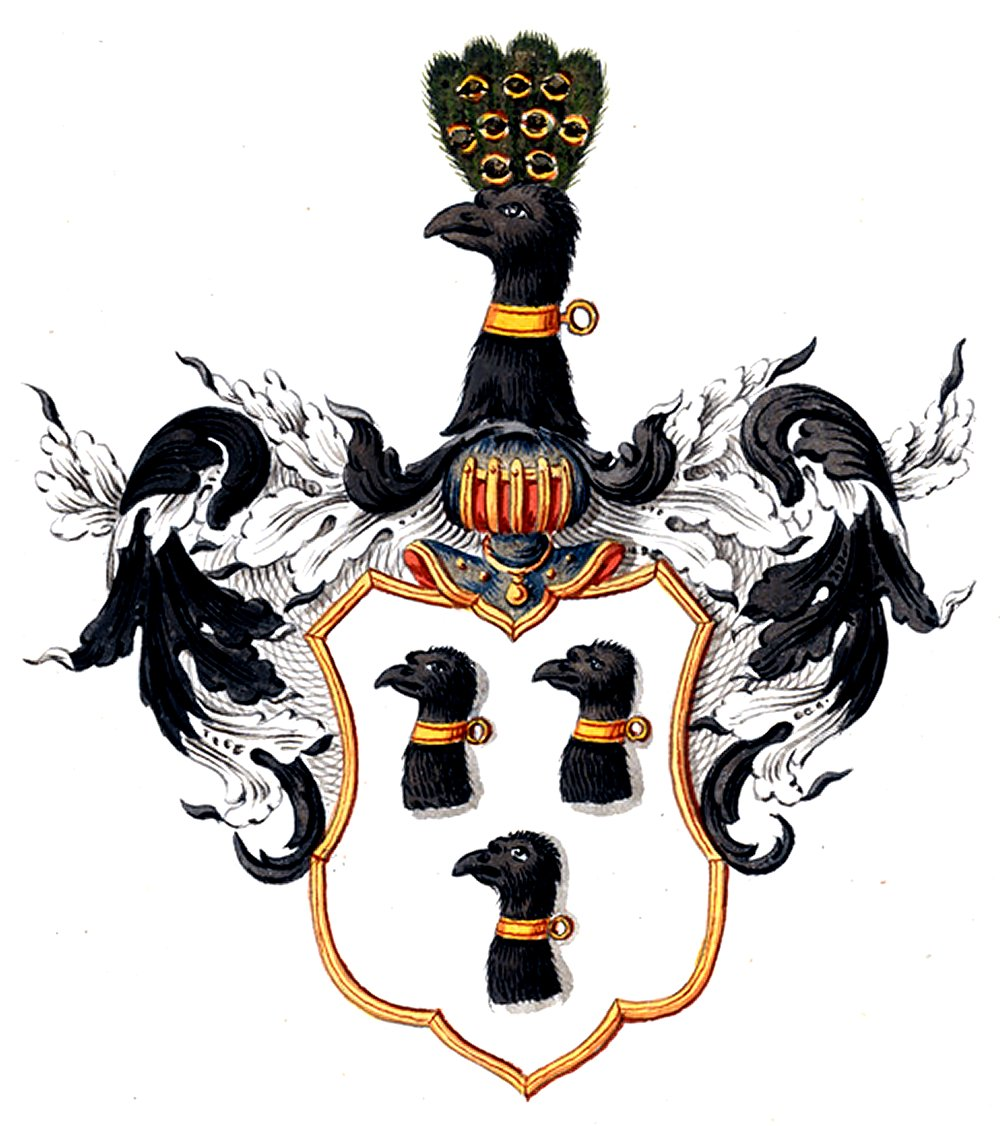
Treskow family coat of arms

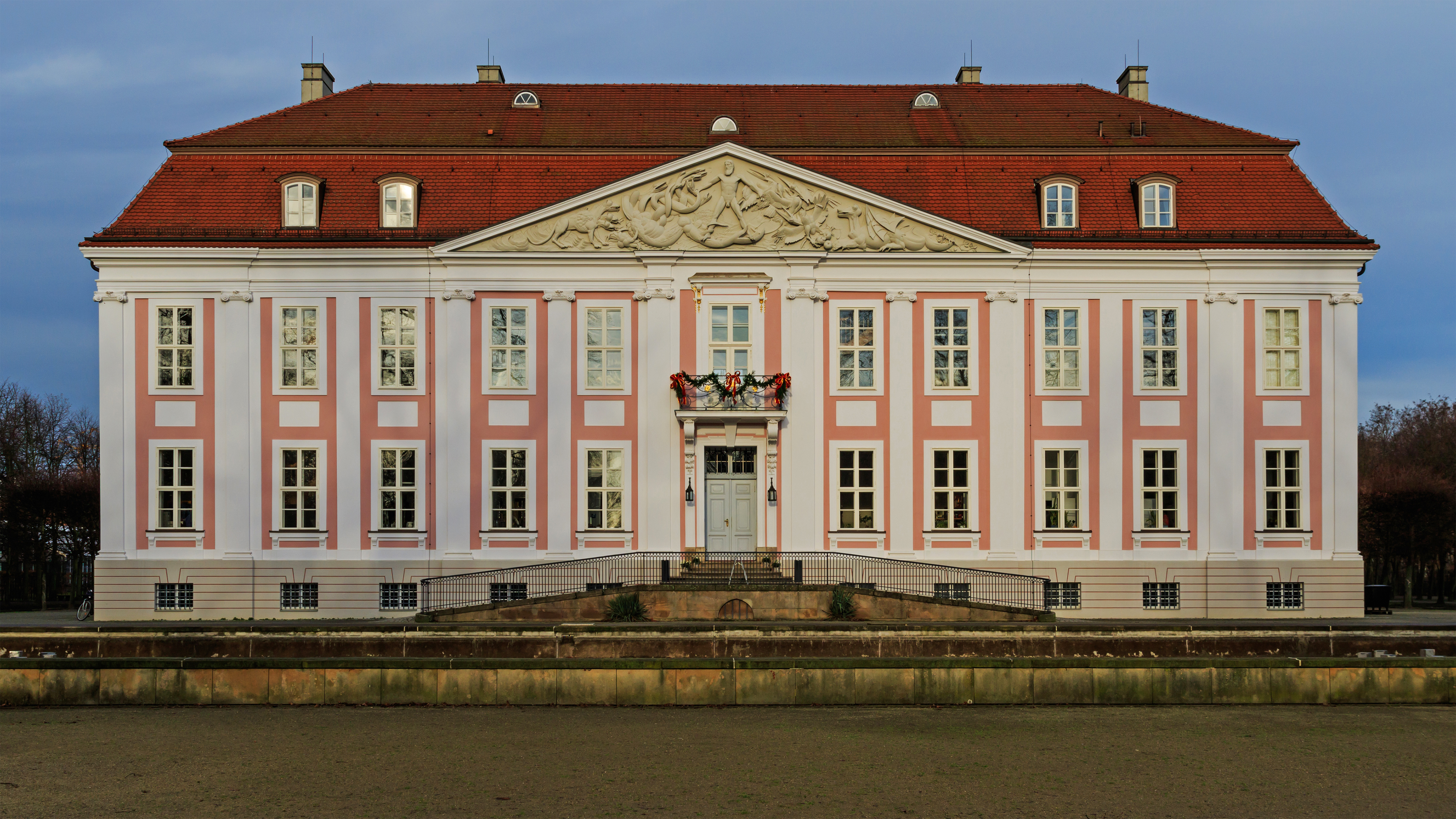
Friedrichsfelde Palace, Berlin residence of the Treskow family until the Soviet invasion of Berlin in 1945

The Treskow family is a German aristocratic family that descended as a branch of the medieval ("uradel") House of Tresckow. The family rose to fame in Prussia due to their large landholdings and business ventures, resulting in many streets and boulevards being named after the family today.

== History ==
The Treskow branch of the medieval House of Tresckow descends from Sigmund Otto Joseph von Treskow (1756–1825) and was formally recognized by King Frederick William II of Prussia in 1797. U.S. President George Washington gave Sigismund Otto Joseph 4000 acres of woods along the Mississippi River in return for providing goods to the Continental Army. Treskow also financed Napoleon Bonaparte's army during the French Revolution, for which he was given the Regent Diamond, now displayed at the Louvre as part of the French Crown Jewels. Napoleon later visited the family at their Owinska and Radojewo palaces and protected their estates from destruction during his campaigns.

The descendants of Sigismund Otto Joseph von Treskow formed their own branches of the family, respectively, and acquired additional estates. Owińska Palace is known to be a remarkable early work of the famous architect Karl Friedrich Schinkel, whose most famous works include the Old Museum and Concert Hall in Berlin. European aristocrats, such as Prince Antoni Radziwiłł, Princess Louise of Prussia and King Frederick William IV, visited the family's estate to enjoy the grounds and architecture.

Friedrichsfelde Palace and its surrounding lands were acquired by Carl von Treskow in 1816, who went on to buy nine more surrounding country estates, and was the family's Berlin residence until the Soviet invasion in 1945. The Berlin district of Karlshorst is named after Carl von Treskow, who started its development into a mansion colony in 1825. Sigismund von Treskow, who lived in the palace from 1880, continued the development of the district and the nearby Karlshorst racecourse. Treskowallee, a major avenue in Berlin, was named after Carl von Treskow.

== Streets and places ==
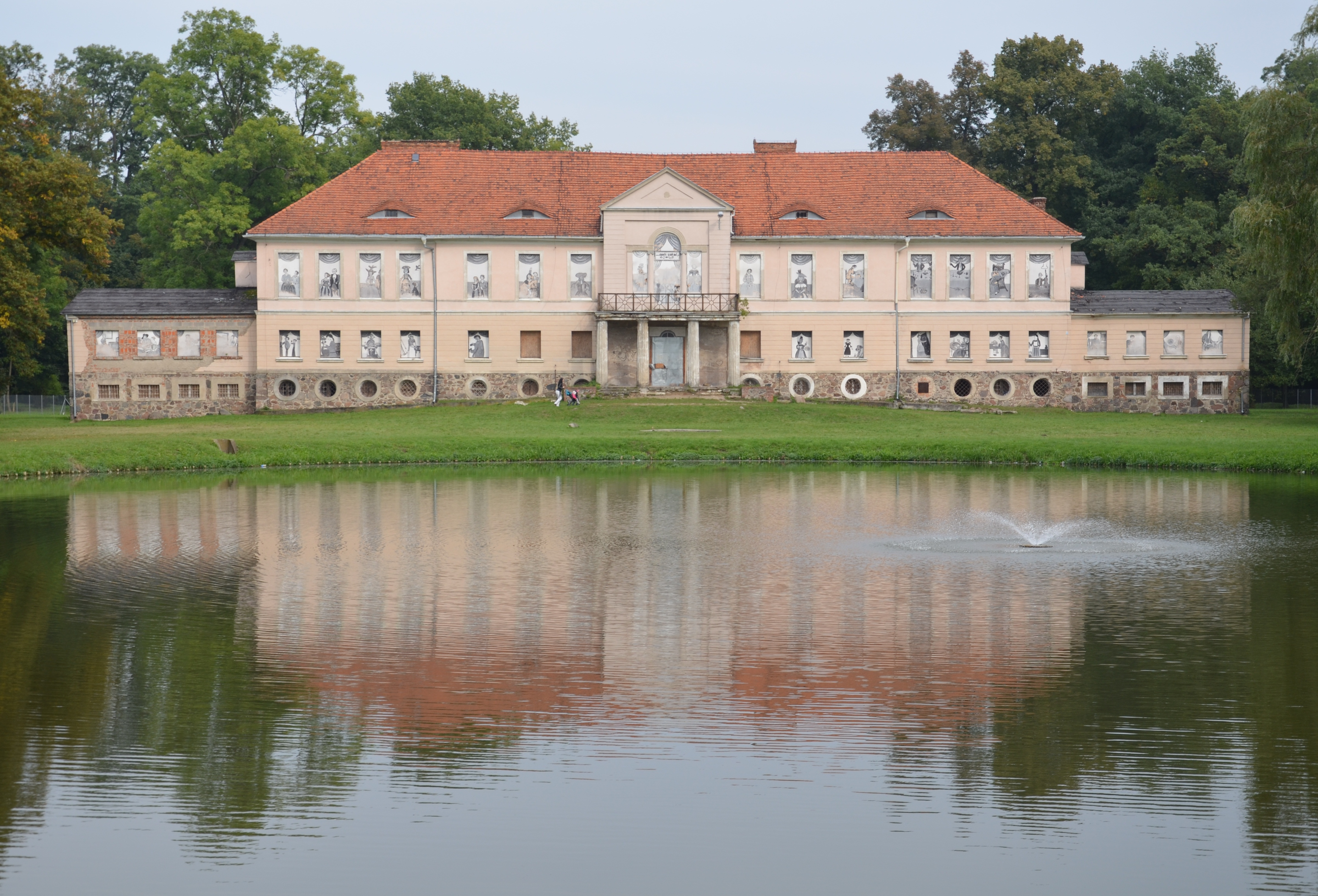
Owińska Palace

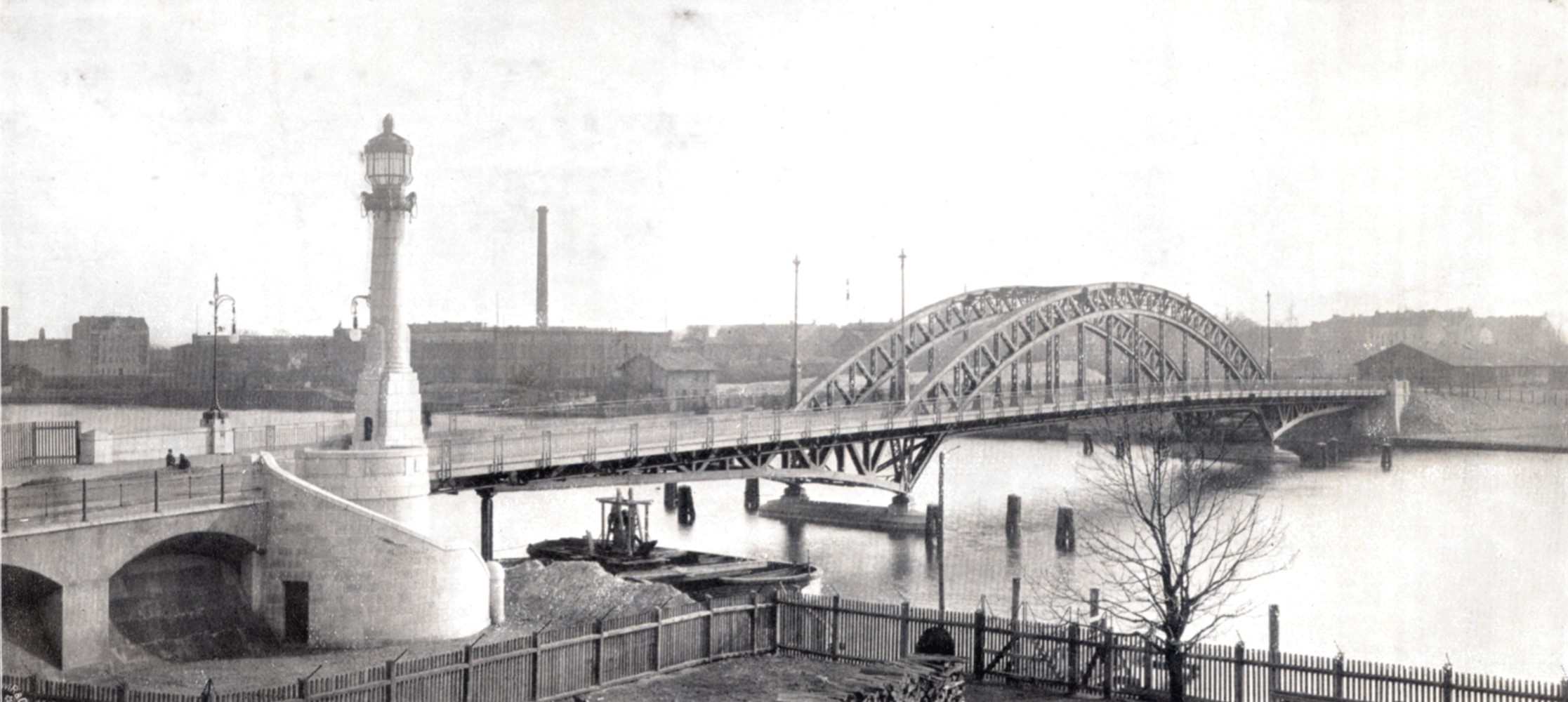
Treskow Bridge in Berlin

- Am Treskower Berg in Treskow (Neuruppin)
- Elisabeth-Treskow-Square in Cologne
- Treskowallee in Berlin, major boulevard home to university and major rail stations.
- Treskow Bridge in Berlin Treptow-Köpenick, bridge over the Spree river.
- Treskowstraße in Berlin-Heinersdorf
- Treskowstraße in Berlin-Mahlsdorf
- Treskowstraße in Berlin-Niederschönhausen
- Treskowstraße in Berlin-Oberschöneweide
- Treskowstraße in Berlin-Tegel
- Treskower Ring in Treskow (Neuruppin)
- Von-Treskow-Pfad in Ilmenau
- Treskow-Höfe ("Treskow Courts") in Berlin-Karlshorst, award-winning residential development.

== Estates ==
=== Austria ===
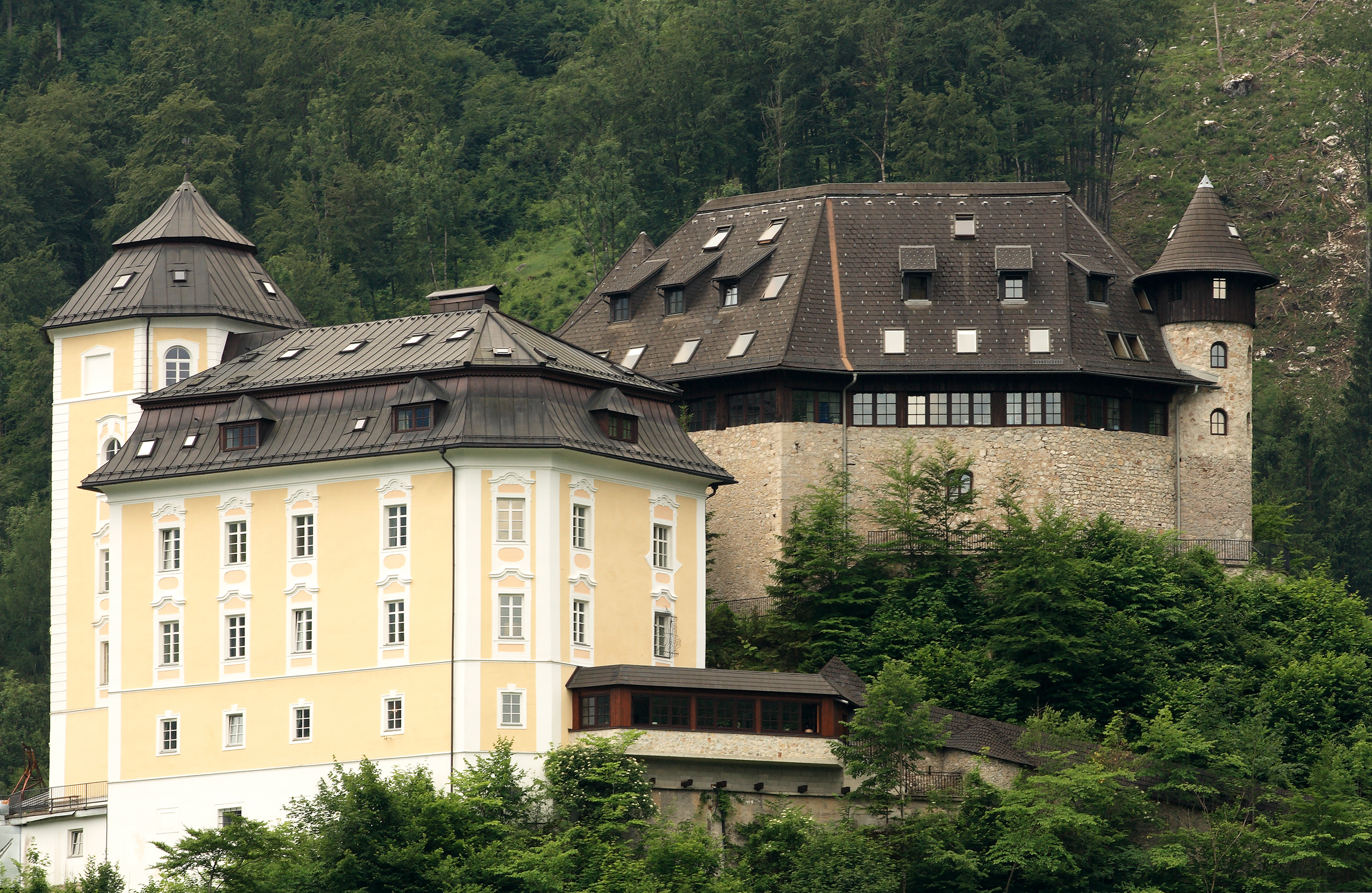
Klaus Castle

- Klaus Castle, bought by Sigismund von Treskow and given to his niece Ursula von Sydow, whose family still owns the castle today.

=== Berlin ===
- Friedrichsfelde Palace, home to the Friedrichsfelde branch of the Family until the Soviet Invasion in 1945 and home to the family's private cemetery.
- Maison George, built by Sigmund Otto v. Treskow's father in law Benjamin George 1796-1798: Residential building with palatial apartments in central Berlin. Former residents and visitors include Alexander von Humboldt, U.S. President John Quincy Adams and Bettina von Arnim, as well as various ambassadors.

=== Brandenburg ===
- Altenplathow Manor
- Dahlwitz Palace, built in 1856 for Heinrich von Treskow
- Kade Manor
- Milow Manor

=== France ===
Niederbaumgarten Palace

- Chateau Livron in Vétraz-Monthoux near Geneva

=== Poland ===
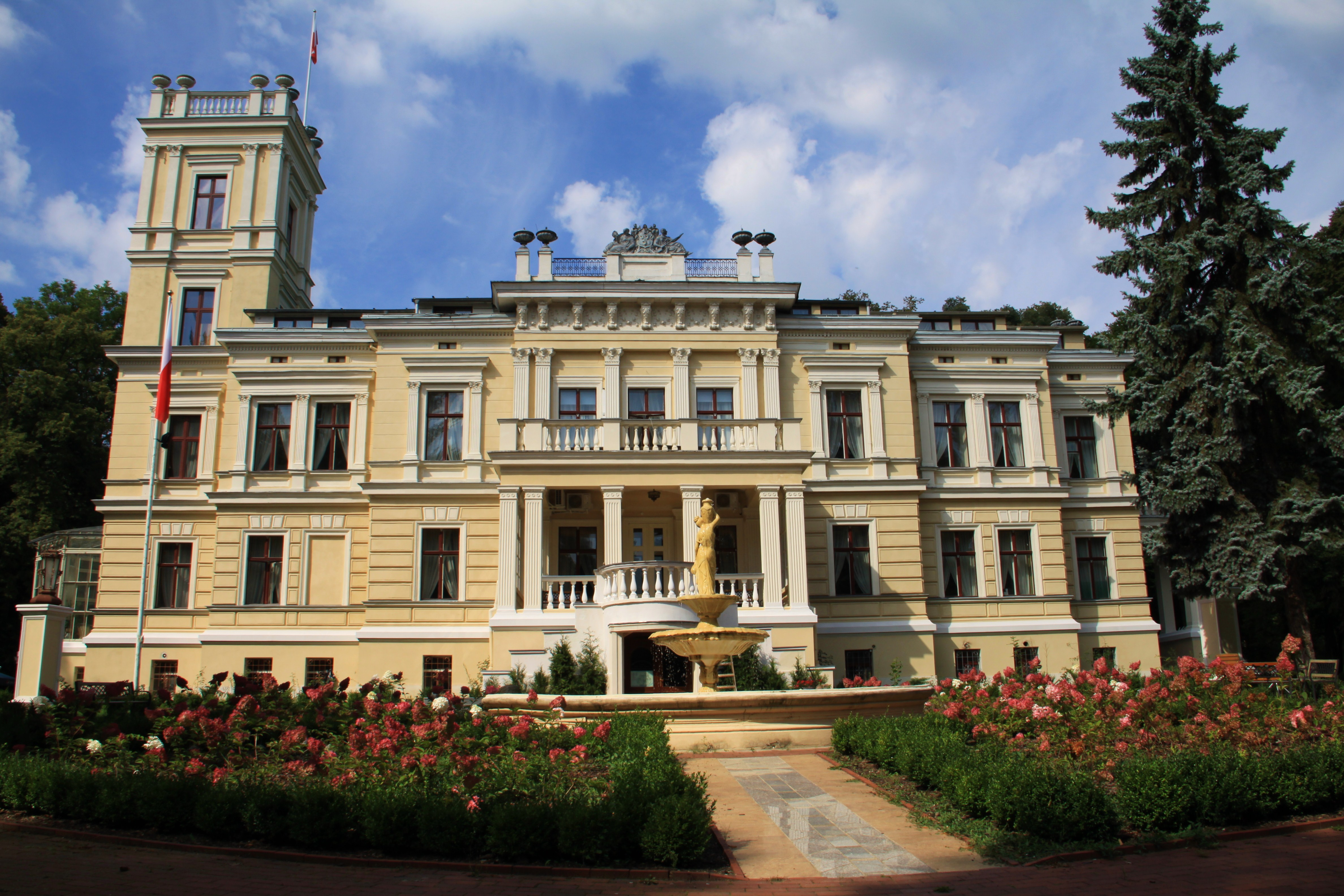
Treskow Palace (Biedrusko)

- Bernau Manor (Bolechowo)
- Chludowo Palace
- Chodowo Palace, built in 1836 for Hermann von Treskow
- Domanikowo Manor, built in 1836 for Hermann von Treskow
- Giesenbrügge Estate (Gizyn)
- Hohenpetersdorff Palace (Pietrzykow)
- Jürgensburg Manor (Grocholin)
- Krähwinkel Manor (Wronczyn),
- Lechlin Palace
- Neuhaus Palace (Nowy Dwor)
- Niederbaumgarten Palace (Sady Dolne), built in 1844 for Otto Sigismund von Treskow
- Nieschawa Palace (Nieszawa)
- Nordheim Palace and Manor (Morasko)
- Owinska Palace, built for Sigmund Otto Joseph von Treskow by Karl Friedrich Schinkel
- Radojewo Palace, built for Sigmund Otto Joseph von Treskow
- Strelcze Manor, built in 1840 for Carl von Treskow
- Treskow Palace (Biedrusko), built in 1880 for Albrecht von Treskow
- Vogelsberg Manor (Nowa Sol), built in 1935 for Albrecht von Treskow by the architect Fritz Schopohl
- von Treskow Palace (Strykowo), built in 1900 for Hans von Treskow, now "Hotel Schloss von Treskow" (polish: Zamek von Treskov)
