= Treskowallee (Berlin) =

Street in Berlin, Germany

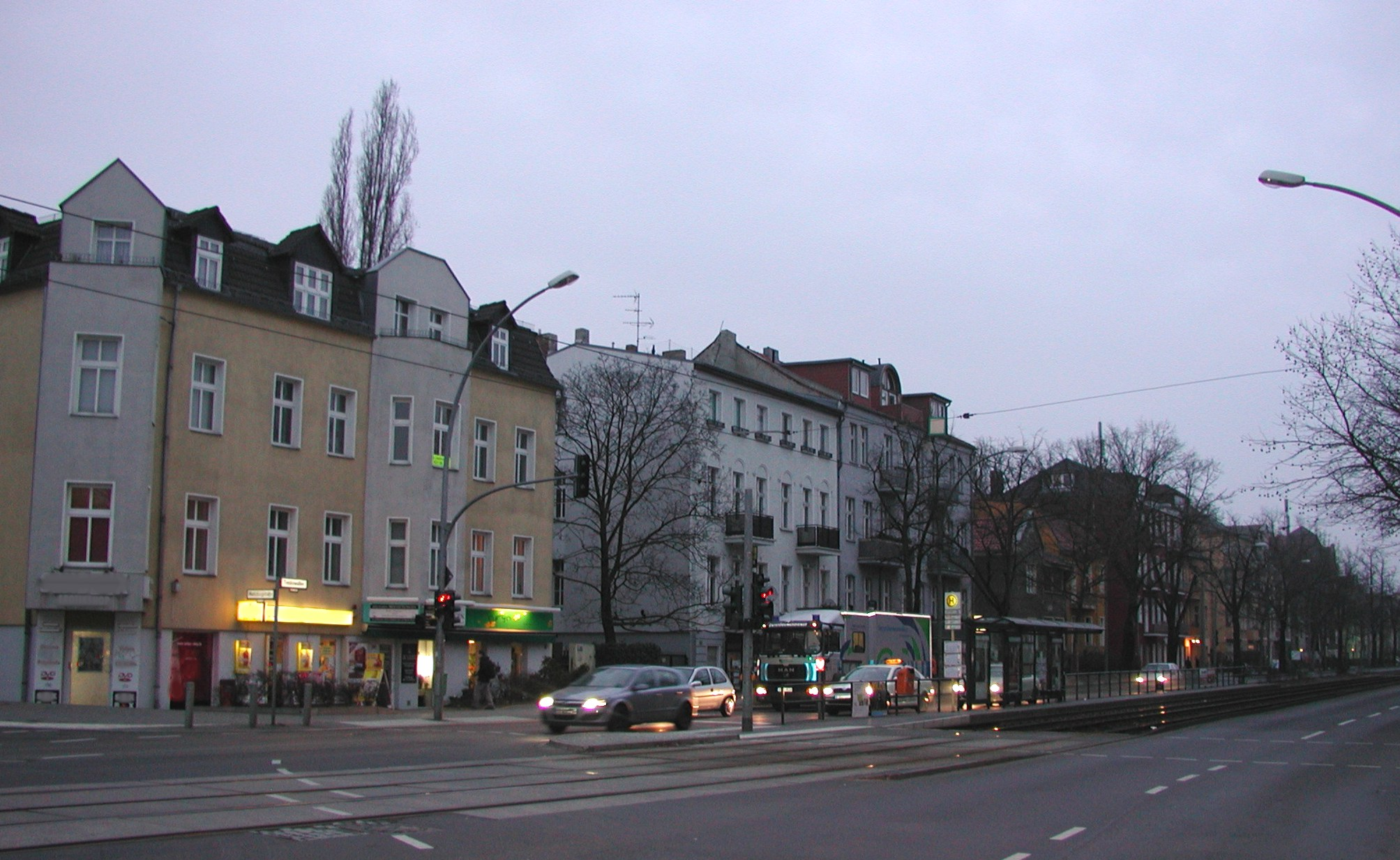
- Treskowallee at Marksburgstraße
- Length: 3,150 m (10,330 ft)
- Location: Berlin, Germany

Construction
- Inauguration: before 1700

Treskowallee (German for "Treskow Avenue") is a large boulevard in Berlin, Germany. It runs through the boroughs of Lichtenberg and Treptow-Köpenick and is home to many landmark buildings and institutions, such as the Berlin School of Engineering and Economics (HTW) and the Karlshorst horseracing track. Between 2013 and 2015, a neighborhood named Treskow Höfe ("Treskow Courts") was developed along the northern end of the avenue. It is named for the Treskow family.

It is served by three Berlin Tram lines and by the Berlin S-Bahn at Karlshorst station.

== History ==
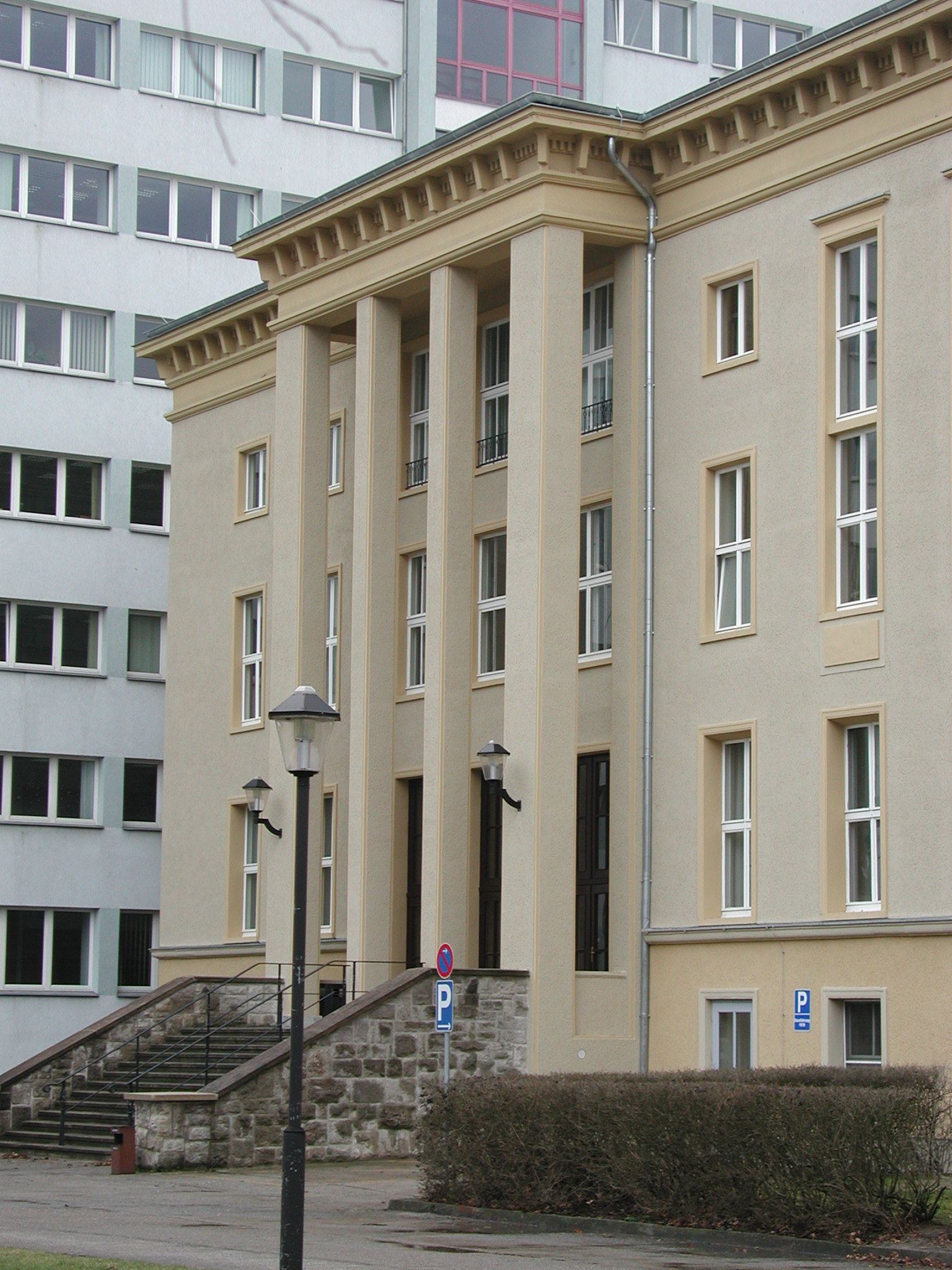
HTW Berlin

Treskowallee was developed in 1895 as part of the Carlshorst (now Karlshorst) mansion settlement by Carl von Treskow, a member of the German Treskow family, who at the time lived in the nearby Friedrichsfelde Palace and owned the surrounding land. The boulevard originally ran from the gates of Friedrichsfelde Palace to the Karlshorst horseracing track, which was opened in 1884. The Karlshorst rail station was opened in 1895. In 1961, the northern part of the boulevard was renamed "Am Tierpark", while the southern part was renamed "Hermann-Duncker-Straße". After the reunification of Berlin, the name was changed back to Treskowallee.

Between the 1970s and 1990s, Treskowallee was home to the Chinese, Mexican and Libyan embassies to the GDR.

The groundbreaking ceremony of the Treskow Höfe ("Treskow Courts") development was hosted by the mayor of Berlin Klaus Wowereit. The construction of the new neighborhood was finished in 2015.

== Transport ==
As a major throughfare in Berlin, Treskowallee is notoriously crowded with cars during rush hour.

=== Rail ===
It is served by the M17, 21, 27, and 37 lines of the Berlin Tram network, as well as the Berlin S-Bahn commuter rail service at Berlin-Karlshorst station.

==== Rail stations along Treskowallee ====
- Treskowallee/HTW
- Marksburgstraße
- Berlin-Karlshorst
- Treskowallee/Ehrlichstraße
- Traberweg
- Hegemeisterweg
- Volkspark Wuhlheide

=== Bus ===
Karlshorst rail station on Treskowallee is served by the 296 and 396 bus lines.
