= Heinrich Dathe =

German ornithologist and zoologist

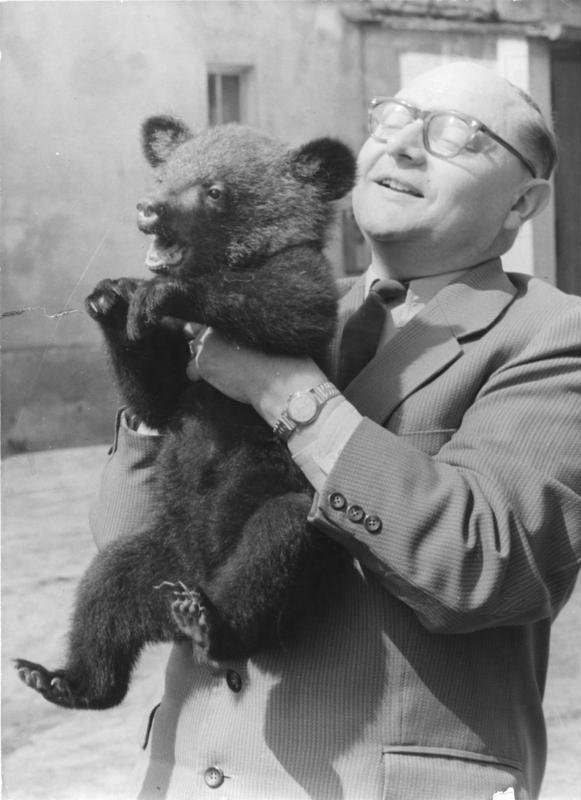
Dathe in 1961 with Evi, a celebrity sun bear cub born in the Berlin zoo.

Curt Heinrich Dathe (7 November 1910 – 6 January 1991) was a German zoologist best known for being the director of the Tierpark Berlin, one of the two zoos in Berlin, where he helped in popularizing animal conservation and worked on the successful captive breeding of a range of animals including numerous species of birds. As a youth he joined to become a member of the Nazi Party and regretted it in a posthumous biography. He received the national prize of the GDR in 1965. A school in Berlin is named after him.

Dathe was born in Reichenbach where his father was an office manager. In the 1930s he studied zoology, botany and geology at the University of Leipzig. He was interested in research and travel.

His early work was as an assistant at the Leipzig zoological gardens under Karl Max Schneider and he worked on a doctoral thesis on the male reproductive organs of guinea pigs and other rodents. He became a deputy director of Leipzig zoo.

In 1932 he joined the NSDAP due to feelings of patriotism. During the second world war he was injured in one arm. At the end of the war he was held as a British prisoner. During this time he contemplated suicide but was inspired when he saw a woodchat shrike. He gave ornithological lectures to the other prisoners.

When he returned to Leipzig he was not allowed to work due to his former party membership. He worked in a series of small jobs, helping on the market, and at one point employed to imitate different bird songs on the radio.

From 1950 he was allowed to teach at Leipzig University. That same year, he was also hired by the Leipzig Zoo. Between 1955 and 1957 he served as acting director.

Dathe helped build the Tierpark Berlin after the war. He was appointed director for the Tierpark and he served for more than three decades during which time he appeared regularly in radio and TV shows making him popular. His sons Holger and Falk are also well known zoologists.

In his memoirs Dathe downplayed his association with the Nazi party. He claimed that he joined the party before it became politically powerful. Dathe however was a director of the chapter (Ortsgruppe) at Leipzig zoo that helped in grassroots activities.

Dathe died of cancer in 1991. His grave in Friedrichsfelde is specially honored by the city of Berlin. Heinrich-Dathe-Platz and Dathe-promenade at the Tierpark metro station are named after him. A memorial plaque was installed in the elephant house at the zoo in 2012. A school in Friedrichshain was renamed after him as the Dathe-Gymnasium. This was criticized on the basis of Dathe's NSDAP membership but it was debated and the name finally retained by a committee.
