= Sady Dolne =

- Village
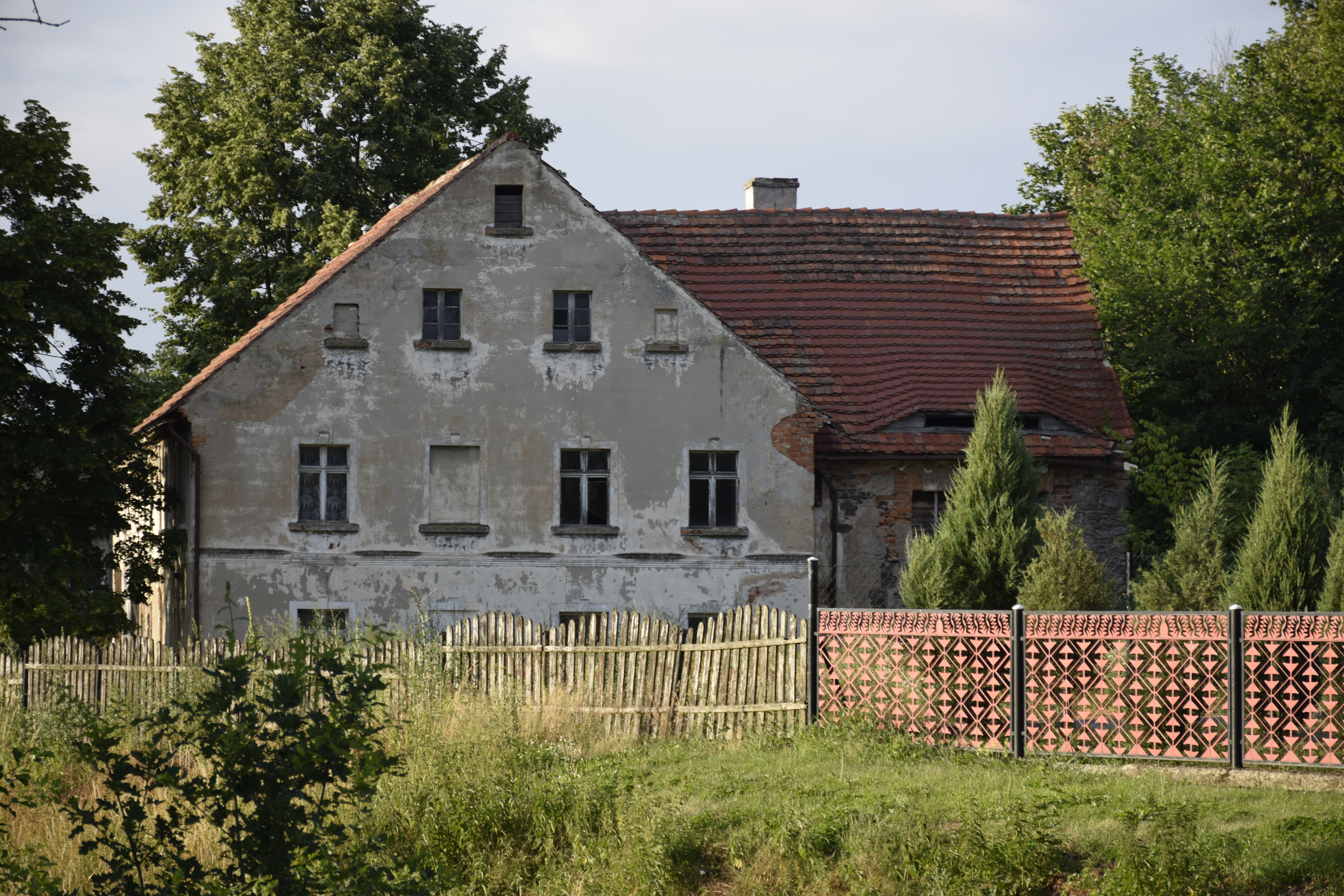
- A house

- Location within Poland
- Coordinates: 50°54′00″N 16°11′00″E
- Country: Poland
- Voivodeship: Lower Silesian
- County: Jawor
- Gmina: Bolków
- Highest elevation: 400 m (1,300 ft)
- Population: 391

Sady Dolne [ˈsadɨ ˈdɔlnɛ] is a village in the administrative district of Gmina Bolków, within Jawor County, Lower Silesian Voivodeship, in south-western Poland.

== Gallery ==
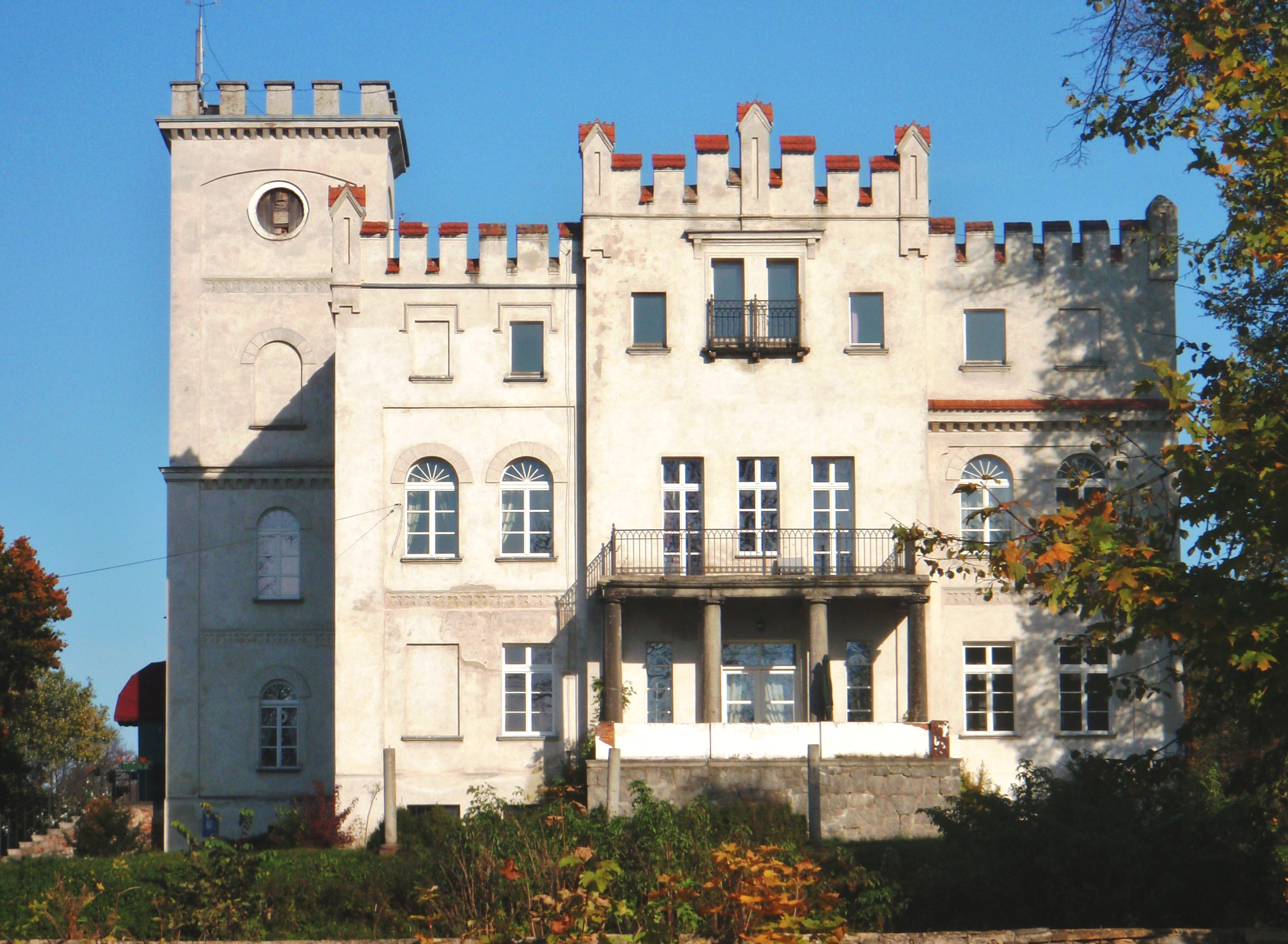
Local chateaux

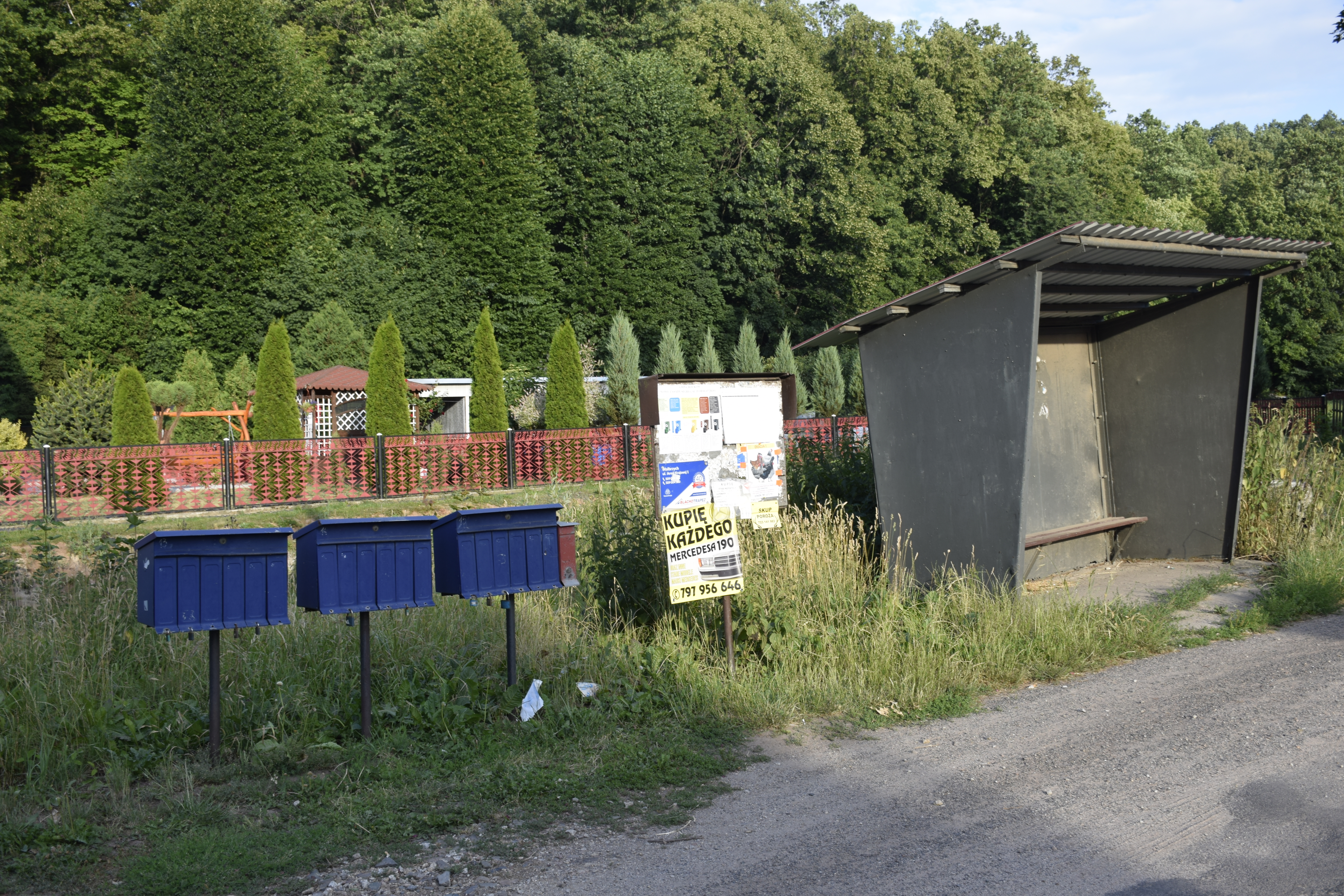
Bus stop shelter

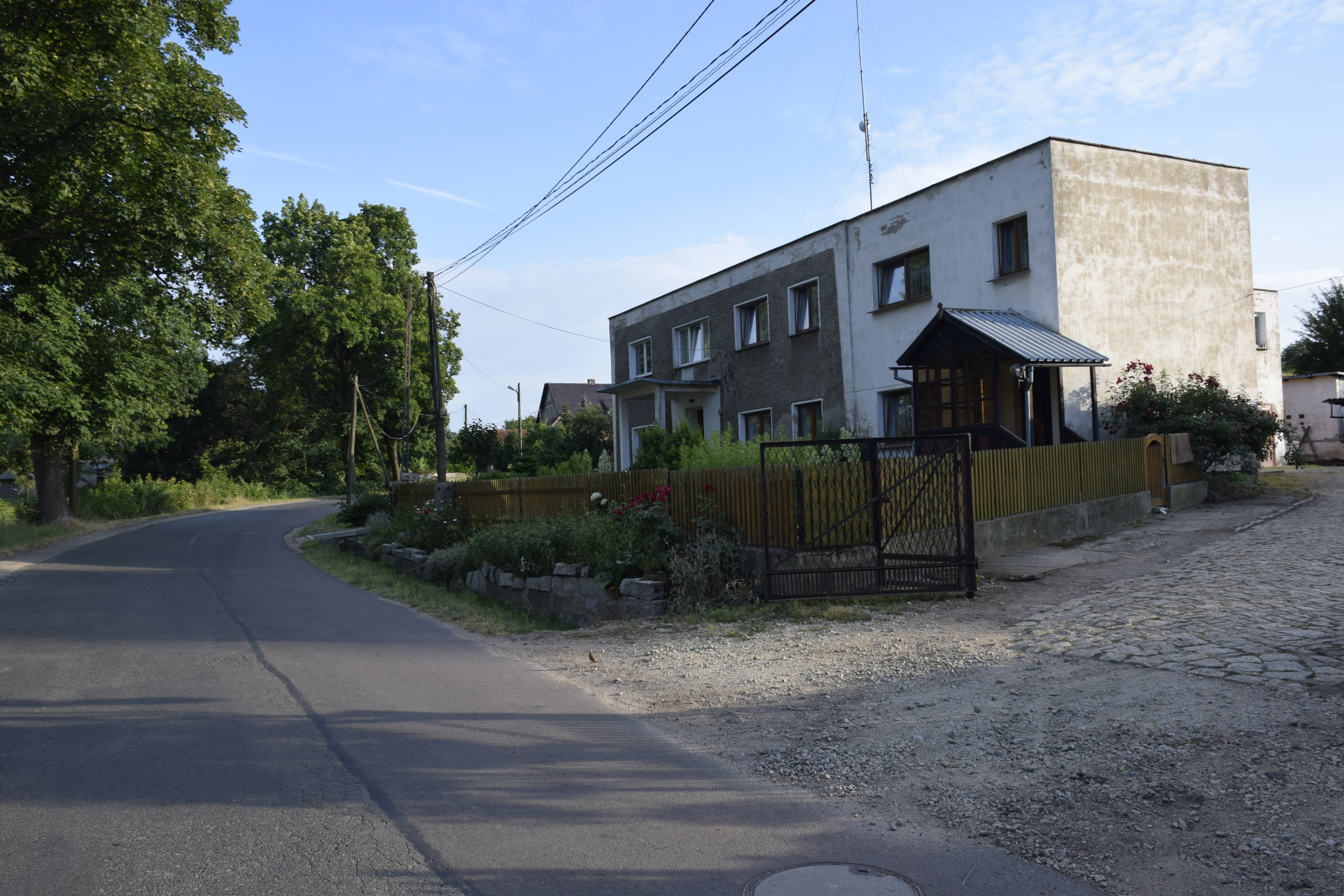
Newer house

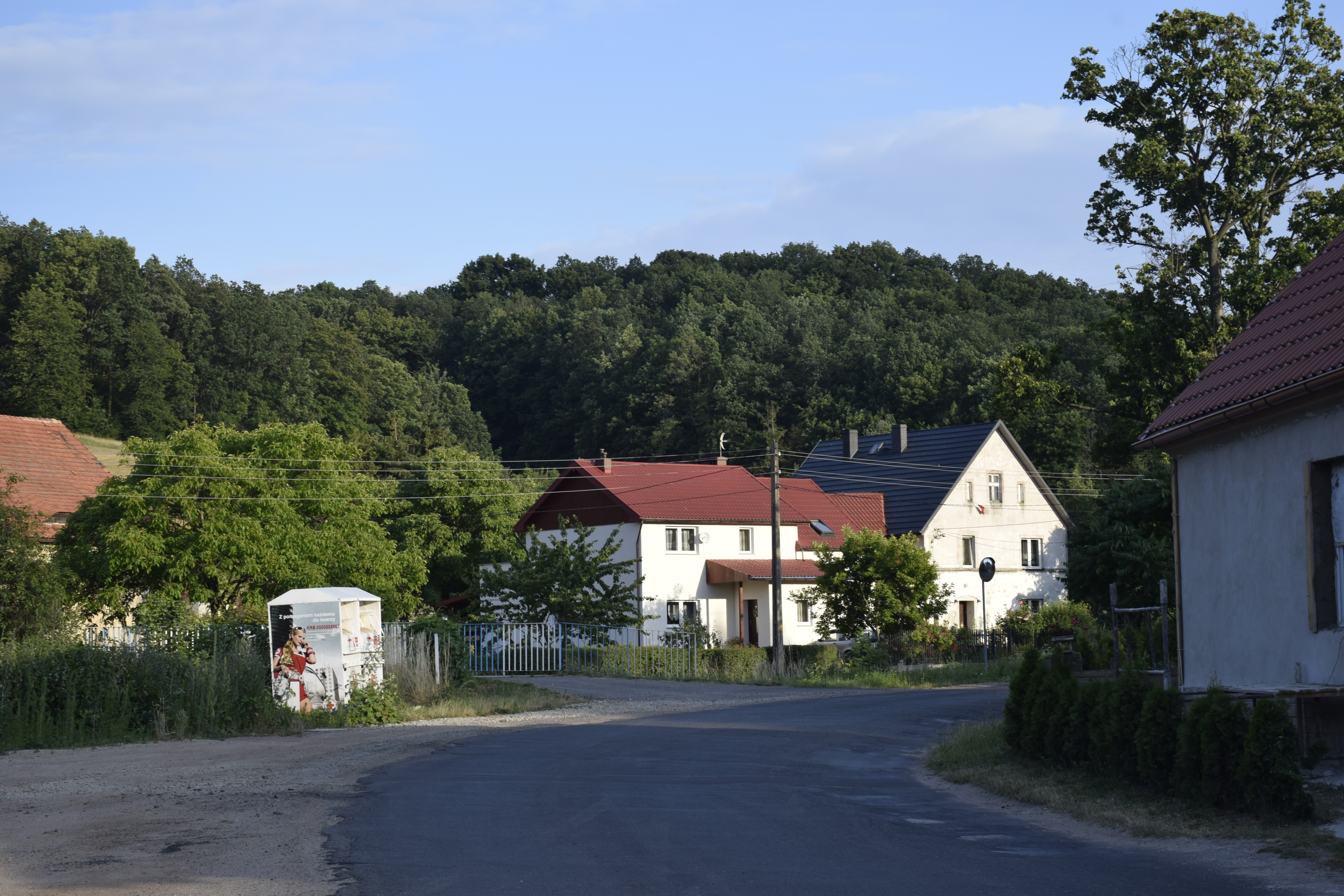
Road

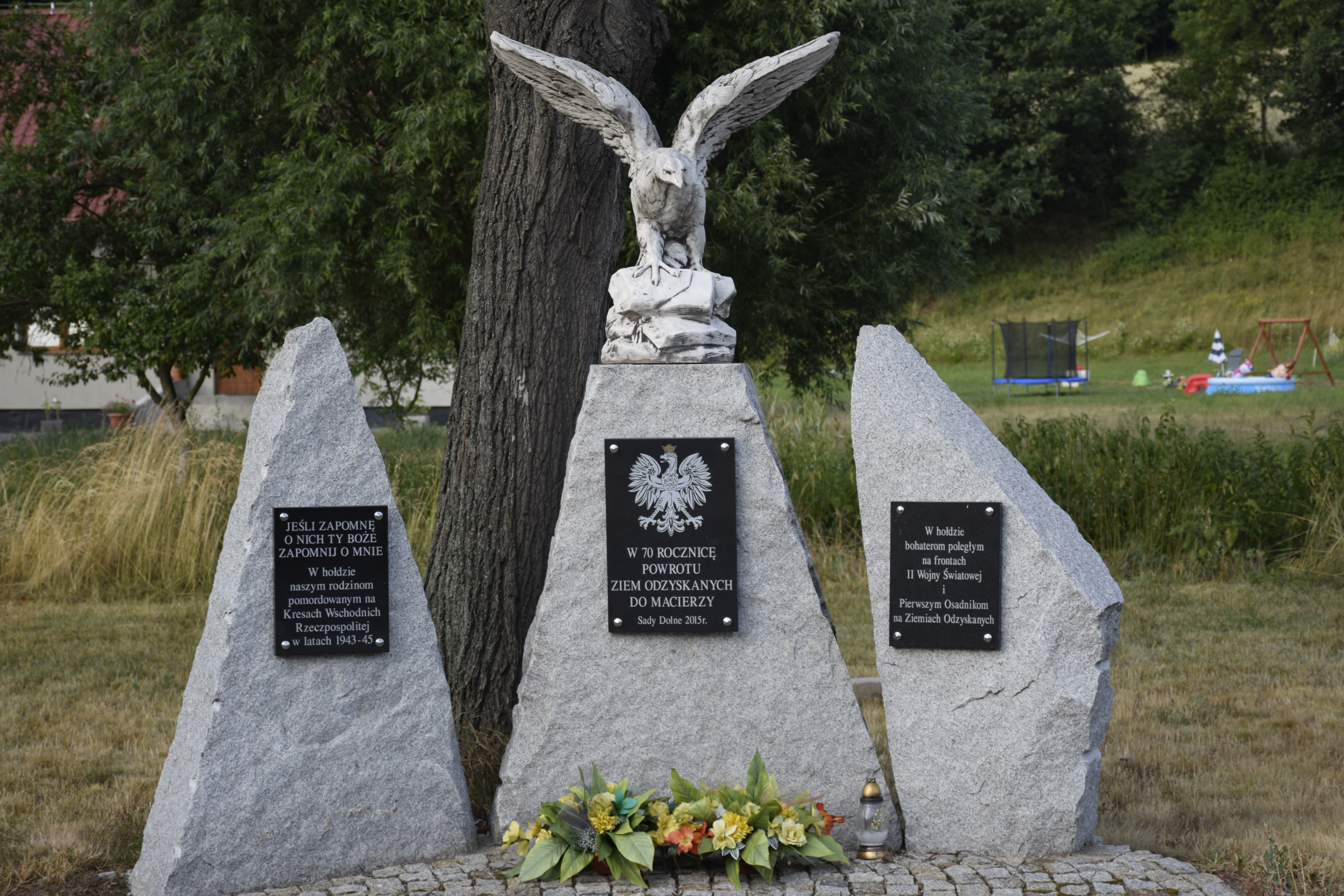
WWII memorial
