= Owińska =

- Village
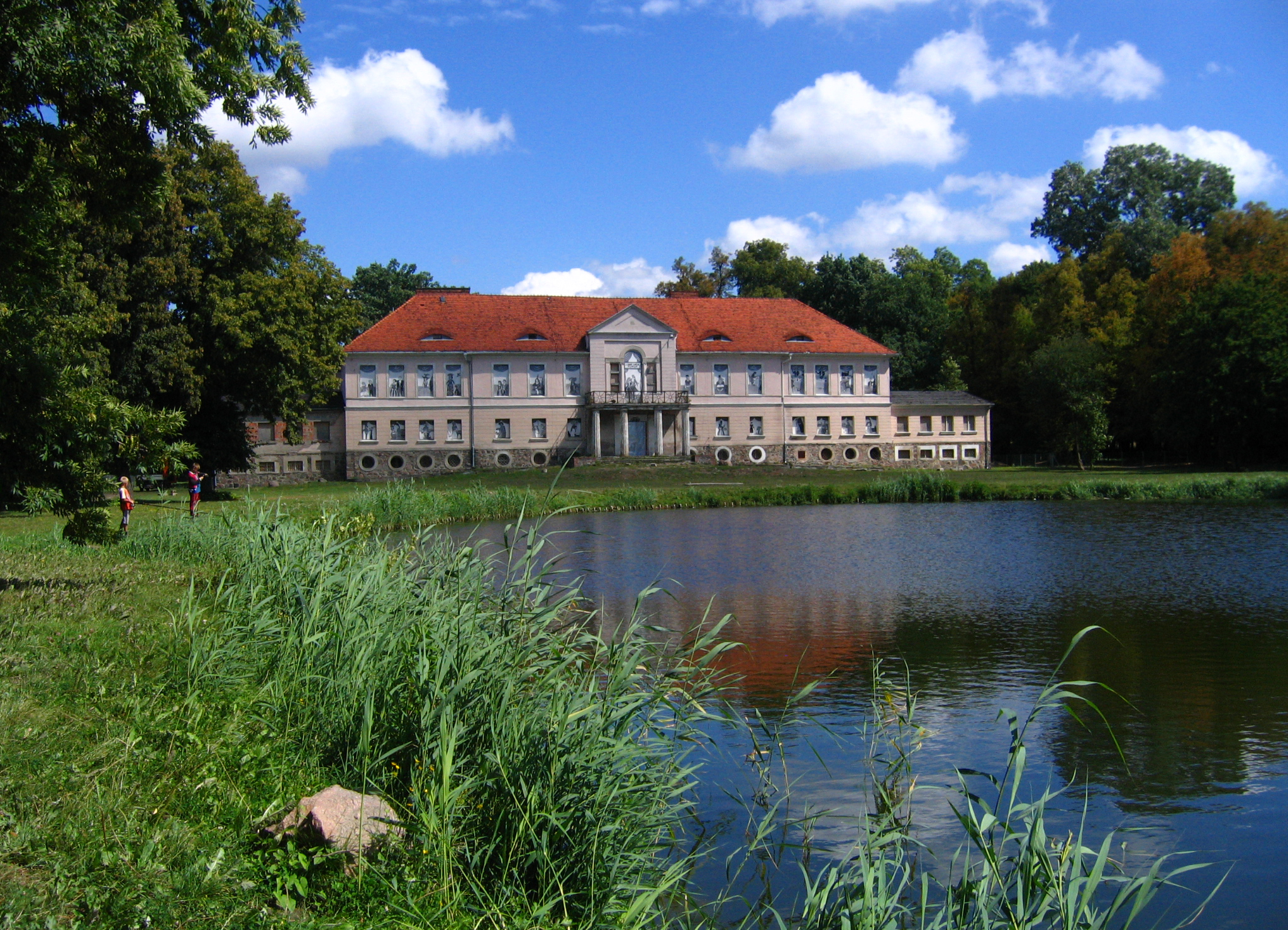
- Owińska Palace in the village

- Location within Poland
- Coordinates: 52°30′N 16°58′E
- Country: Poland
- Voivodeship: Greater Poland
- County: Poznań
- Gmina: Czerwonak
- Population: 2,500
- Time zone: UTC+1 (CET)
  - Summer (DST): UTC+2 (CEST)

Owińska [ɔˈviɲska] is a village in the administrative district of Gmina Czerwonak, within Poznań County, Greater Poland Voivodeship, in west-central Poland.

Owińska lies close to the Warta river, on the main road and railway line from Poznań to Wągrowiec. In the village are a former Cistercian convent (now a school for the blind), a Renaissance church, and a palace built in late classical style (1804–1806).

== World War II ==
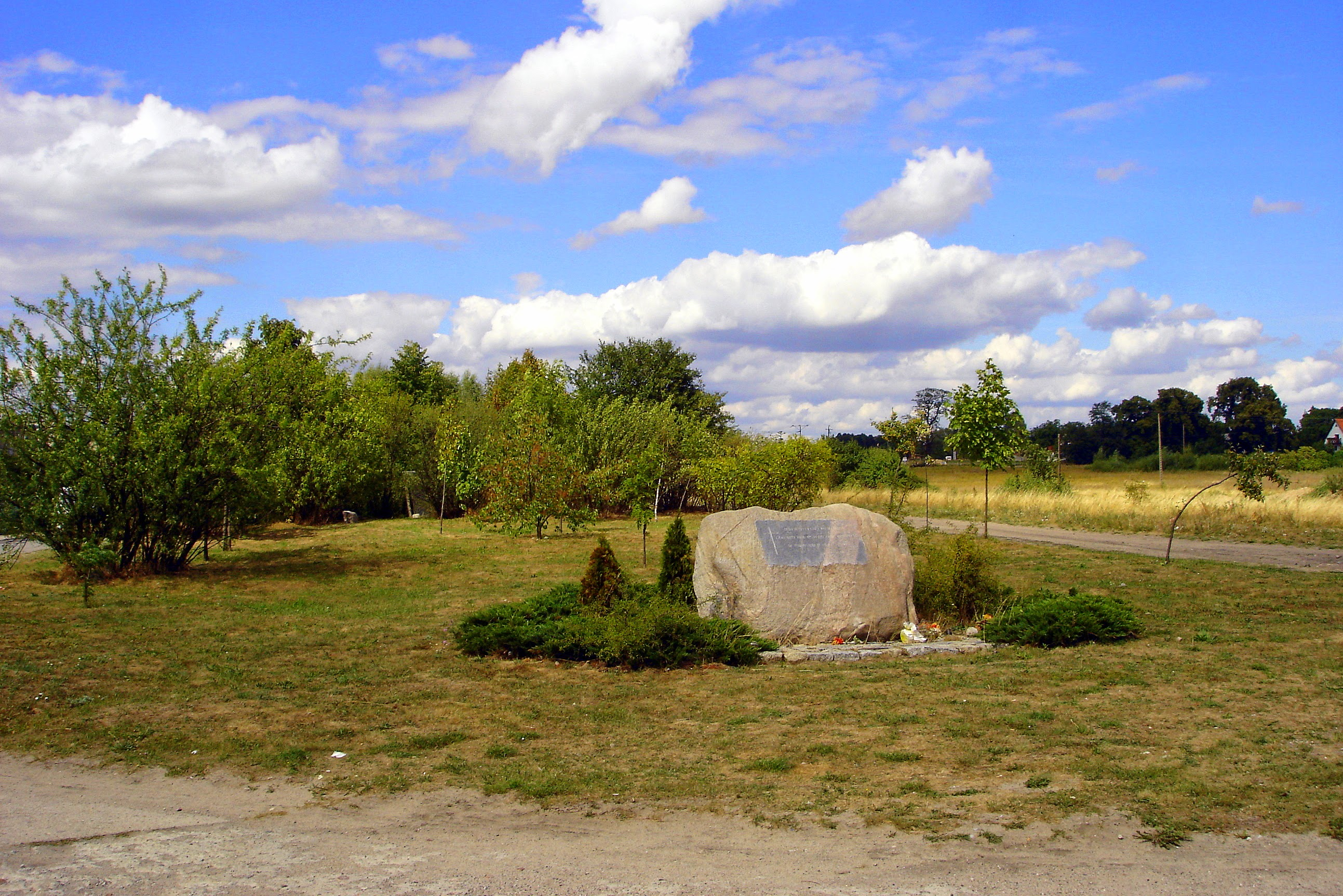
Memorial stone to the patients of the mental hospital, murdered by Nazi Germany during the World War II occupation of Poland

During 1943 - 1945 it was named Treskau by Nazi Germany.

Owińska was the location of a mental hospital where approximately 1,000 patients were murdered by Nazi Germany during World War II (Aktion T4). They were shot in the back of the neck in the nearby forest. The victims were buried in 28 mass graves. In the second stage of Aktion T4 conducted after October 26, 1939, the remaining patients were taken to a bunker in Fort VII and gassed with carbon monoxide released from steel bottles. A year later, additional 200 patients from Poznań were brought in and gassed at the same location.

From August 1943 to January 1945 the German Nazi administration operated a subcamp of the Gross-Rosen concentration camp in the village, whose prisoners were mostly Poles and Russians.

== Cultural heritage ==
The village has several registered sites of cultural heritage: Owińska Palace, mental hospital complex, Cistercian nuns monastery complex, St. Nicholas Church, and a brewery.
