= Owińska Palace =

Palace in Owińska, Poland

Coordinates: 52°30′53″N 16°58′35″E

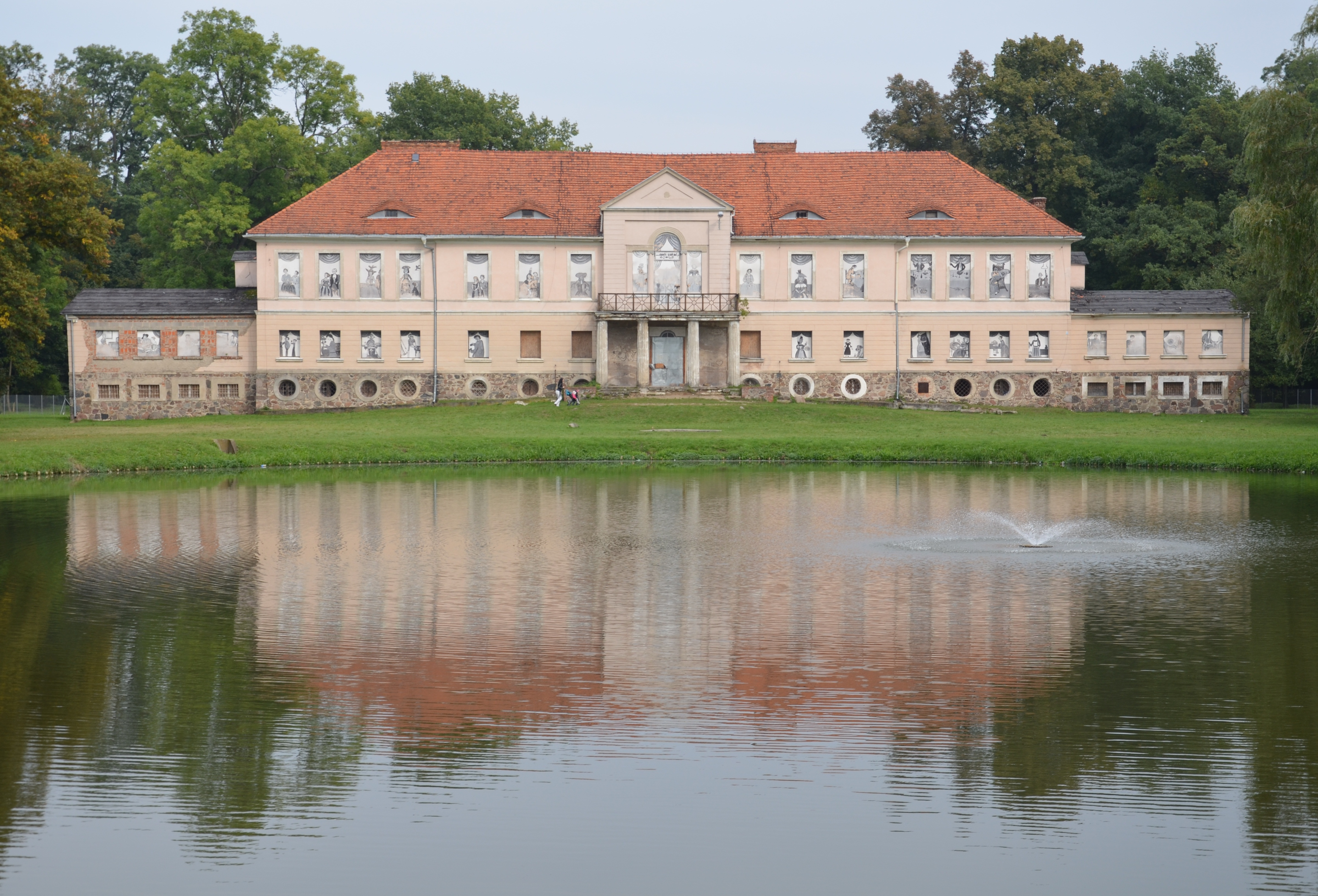
Palace in the Owińska village

The Owińska Palace is a palace in the village of Owińska, Poznań County, Greater Poland Voivodeship, Poland. The palace complex, including its two gates and the surrounding park, is included into the register of immovable cultural property of the Greater Poland Voivodship.

The palace, built in classical style was an early work of Karl Friedrich Schinkel.

== History ==
As a result of the Second Partition of Poland of 1793, the area fell into the Prussian Partition. The Owińska estate, which was owned by the local Cistercian convent and included several nearby villages, was confiscated and some 12,000 hectares was transferred to Sigmund Otto Joseph von Treskow, who invested considerable funds into the development of the whole property, including the renovation of the palace. The new palace was built according to the plans of Ludwig Catel and Karl Friedrich Schinkel.

In Communist Poland the palace was used as a school building. On the occasion of the anniversary of Schinkel in 1985, Polish cultural heritage protection authorities arranged some renovation of the building. After the fall of Communism the building was privatized, left unused, and fell into disrepair, in particular, due to theft and vandalism. Polish television, Frankfurter Allgemeine Zeitung, the Polish embassy in Berlin, and the Ministry of Culture in Warsaw drew an attention to the sorry state of the affairs, and eventually a private German businessman Claus Queck from Düren arranged a consortium to save the complex.
