= Friedrichsfelde Palace =

- Schloss Friedrichsfelde
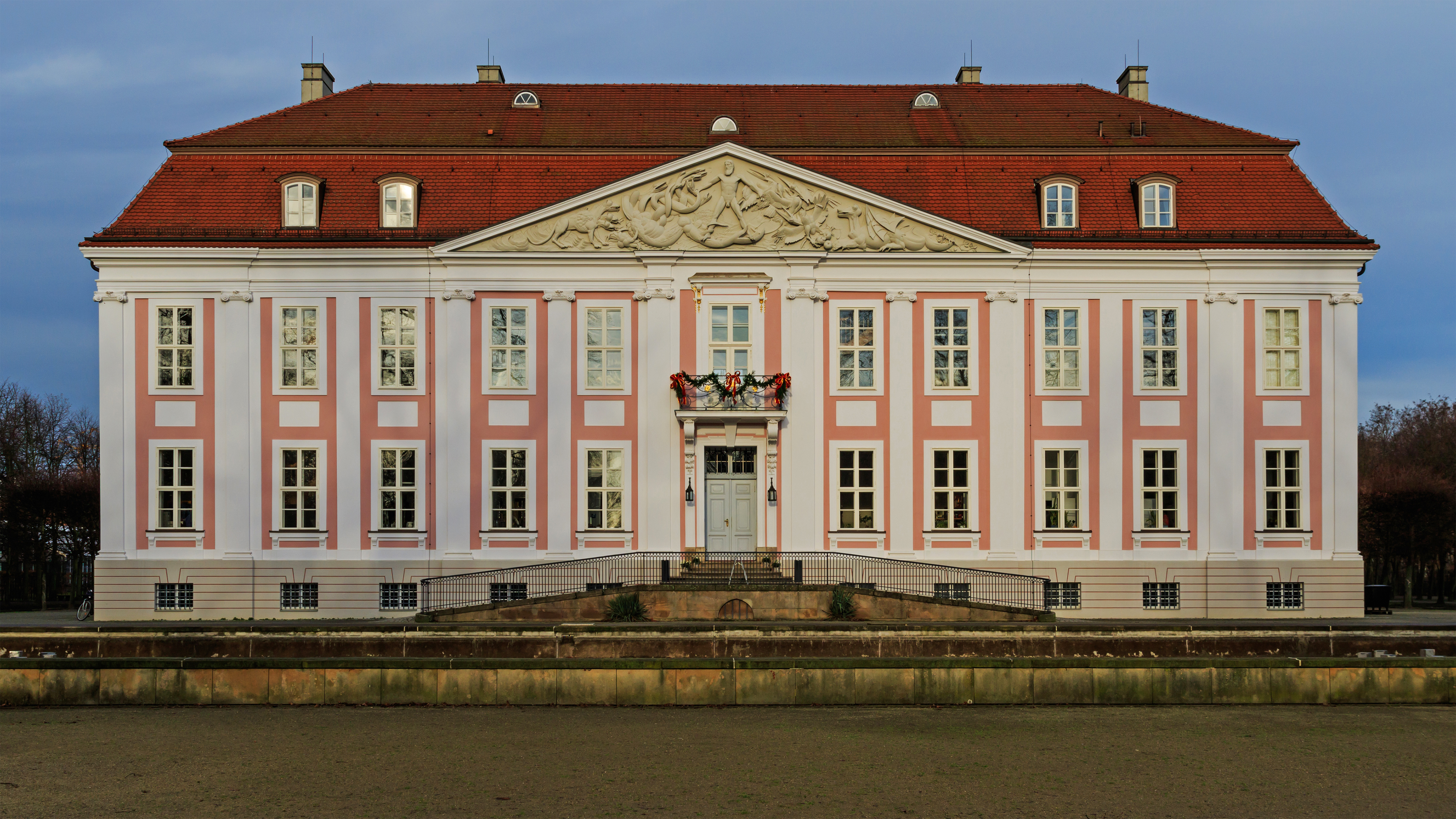
- Friedrichsfelde Palace, 2015
- Interactive map of the Friedrichsfelde Palace area

General information
- Type: Palace
- Architectural style: Neoclassical
- Location: Berlin, Germany
- Coordinates: 52.5047°N 13.5236°E
- Construction started: c. 1695
- Renovated: 1719, 1800

Design and construction
- Architect: Martin Heinrich Böhme

Friedrichsfelde Palace (German: Schloss Friedrichsfelde) is a Neoclassical-style building in the centre of the Tierpark Berlin in Berlin-Friedrichsfelde. It was property of various noble Prussians and occasionally owned by Prussian Kings. The last owners were the Treskow family, whose landmarked family burial ground is located in the surrounding park. Currently, the palace offers exhibitions about its history and is a place for classical concerts and cultural events.

== History ==
Formerly constructed c. 1695 by architect Johann Arnold Nering as Rosenfelde Palace, the building received its current name in 1699 since Frederick I of Prussia came into possession of the palace. In 1719, architect Martin Heinrich Böhme expanded the dimensions of the building on behalf of its new owner, Margrave Albert Frederick of Brandenburg-Schwedt, a half-brother of the late king. Thus, Friedrichsfelde Palace was equipped with new baroque stairs and the size of the facade was extended. In 1762, the building became property of Prince Augustus Ferdinand of Prussia, the youngest brother of Frederick the Great. He intended to have the palace completely altered and enlarged.

However, he discarded his plans for Friedrichsfelde Palace and instead used them for the construction of Bellevue Palace in the Tiergarten of Berlin. After moving there in 1786, he sold Friedrichsfelde Palace to the exiled Duke of Courland, Peter von Biron, who had the ballroom on the upper floor redesigned in neo-classical style. Sold several times in the course of the following decades, Friedrichsfelde Palace received its neoclassical appearance in 1800.

In summer 1816, Carl von Treskow acquired the building and hired the Prussian landscape architect Peter Joseph Lenné to transform the park of the palace into an English landscape garden, which is still home to the family's burial ground. The palace remained in possession of the Treskow family until May 1945, when the Red Army conquered the palace. The building itself overcame World War II with little damage. The restorations of Friedrichsfelde Palace started in 1967. Since 1981, the building has been used for musical concerts and as a museum.

== Gallery ==
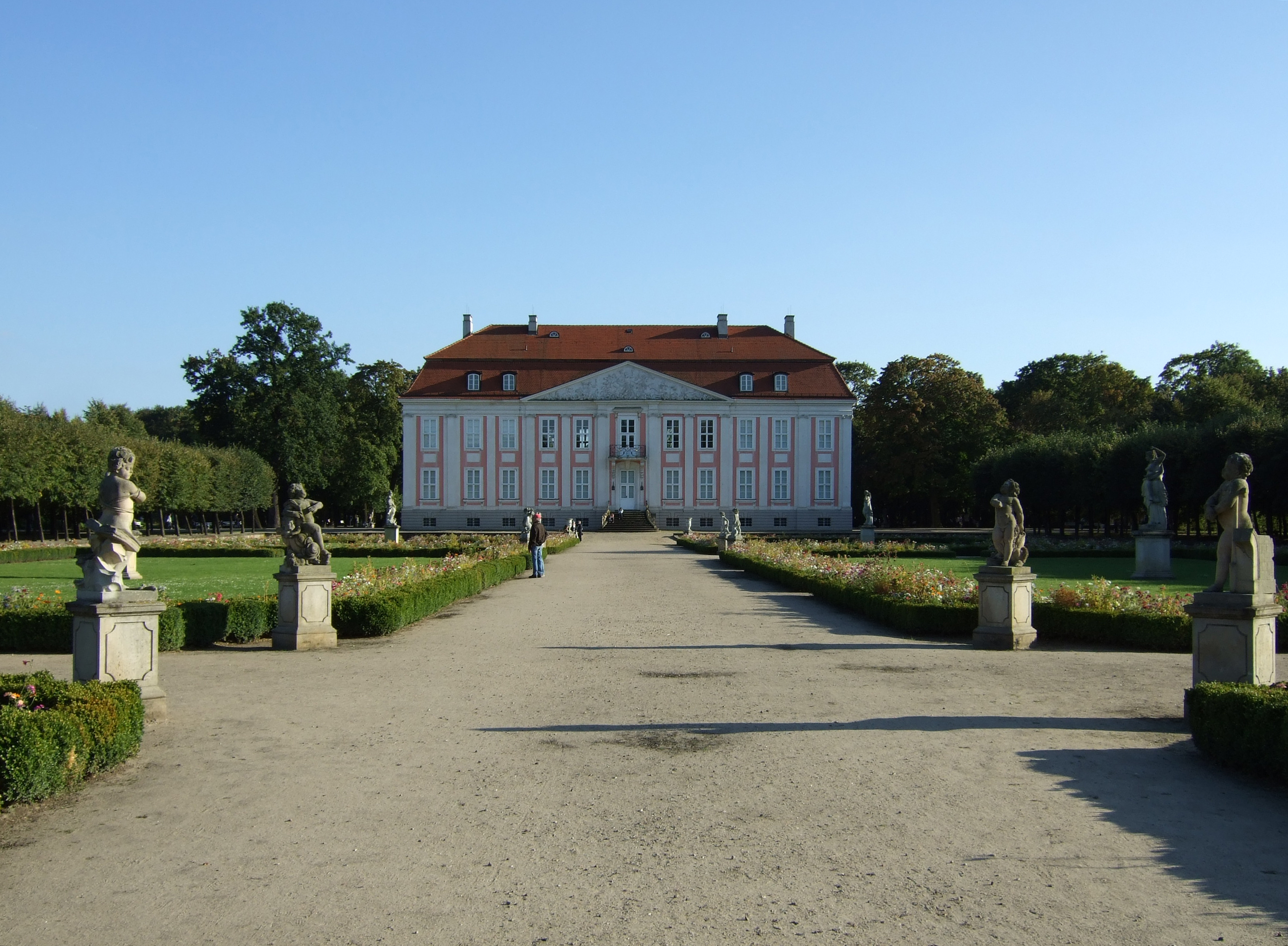
Garden of the palace

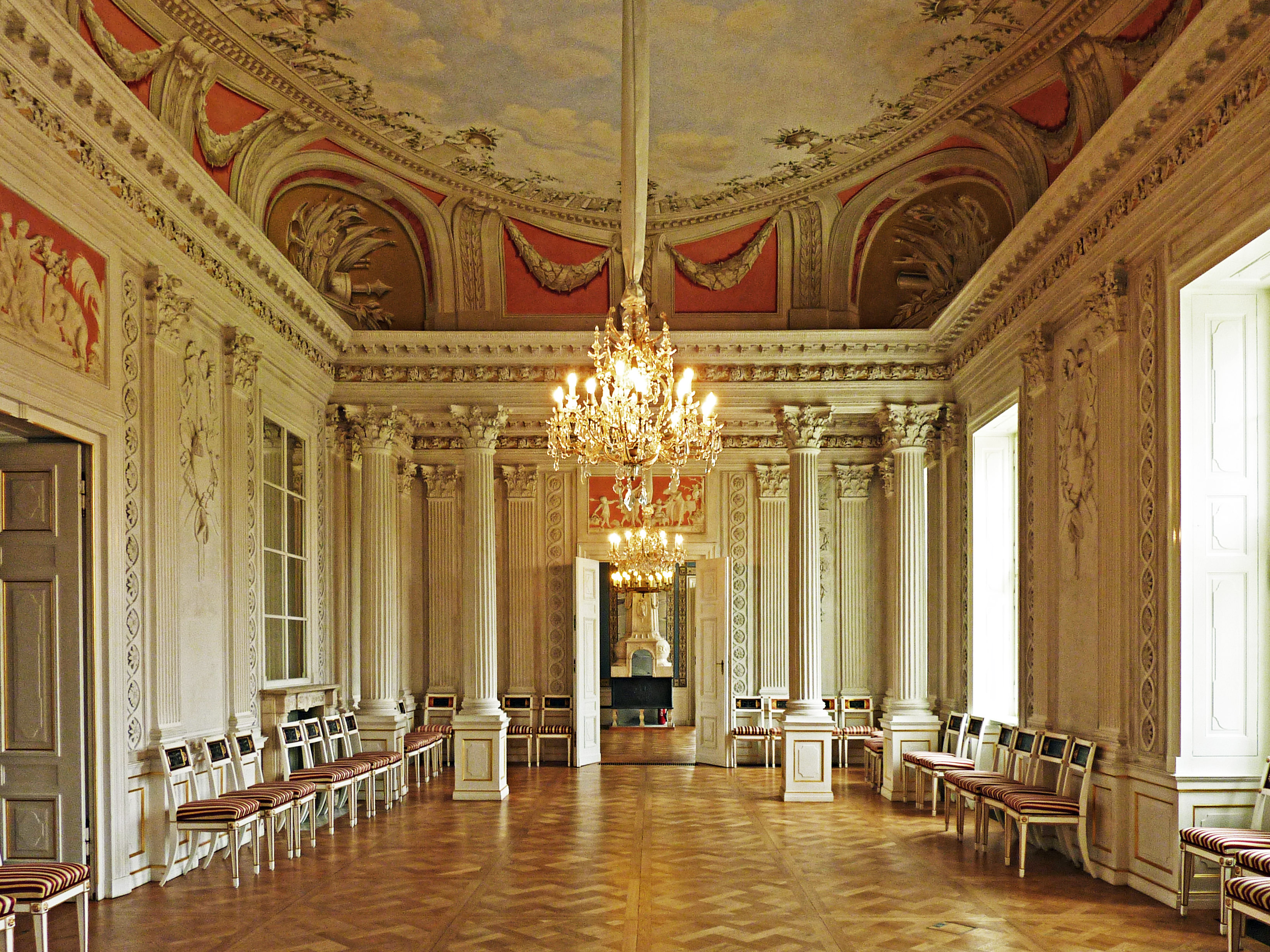
Ballroom

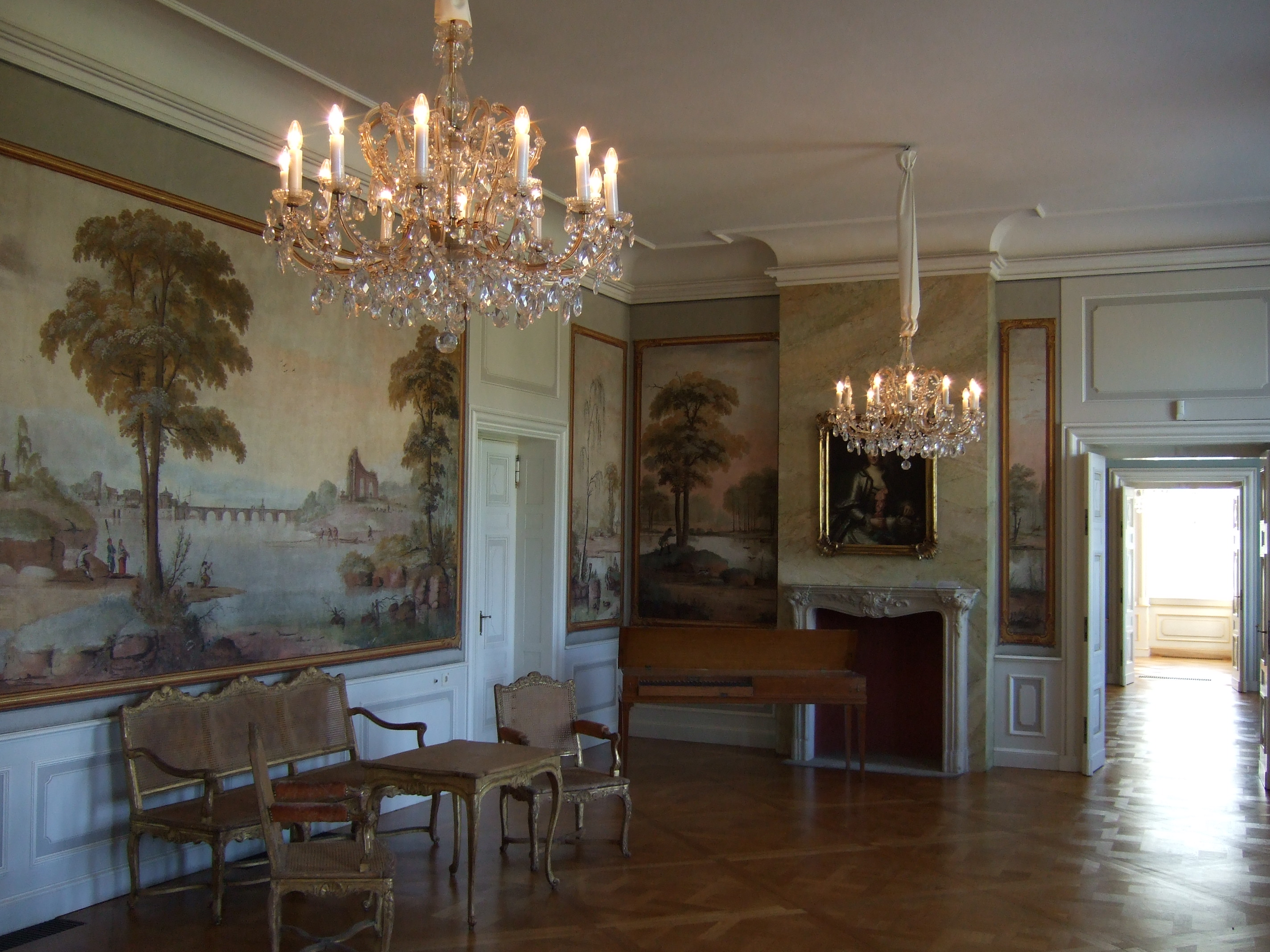
The Gartensaal, interior of the building

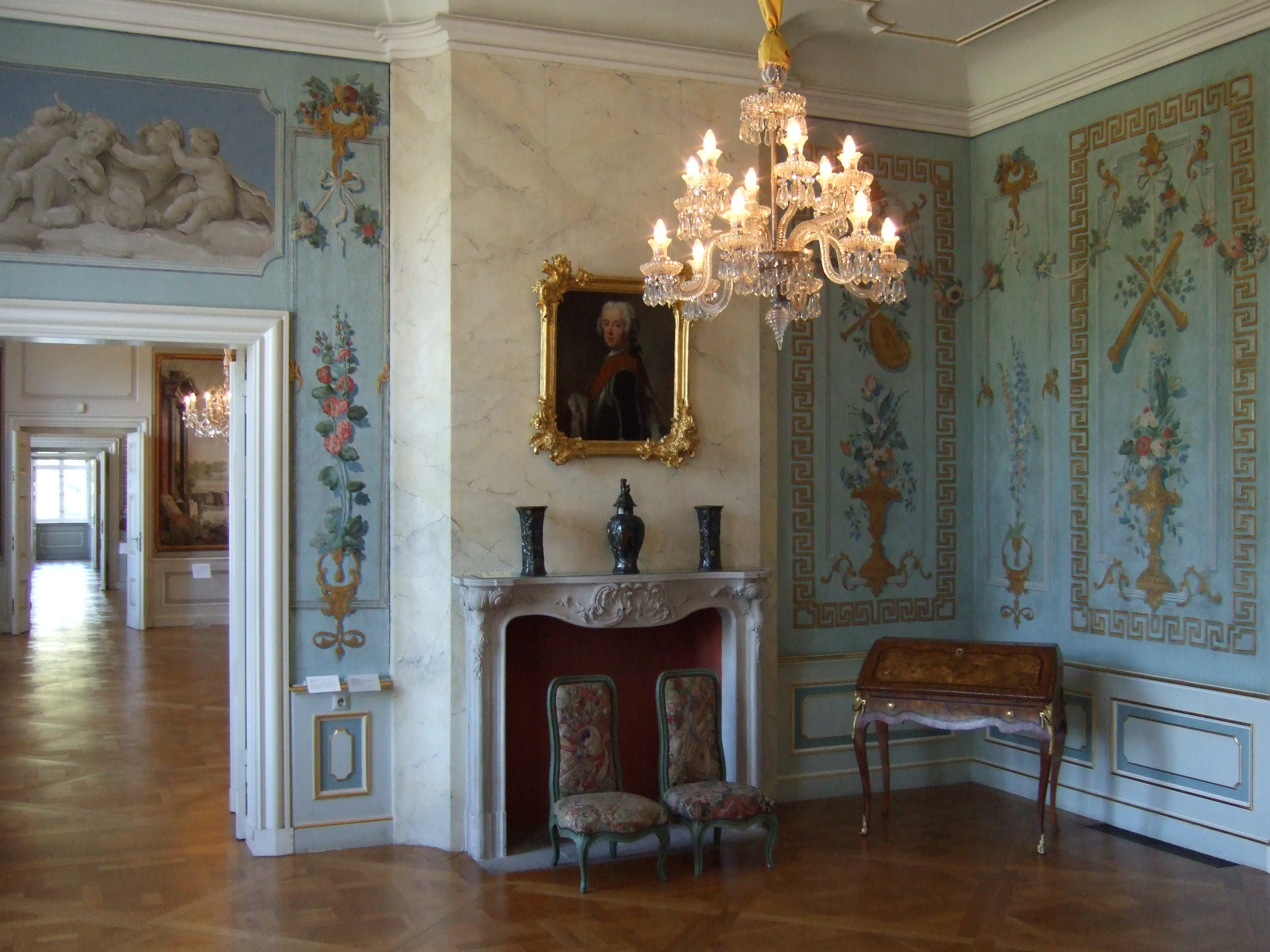
The music room with murals from the 18th century

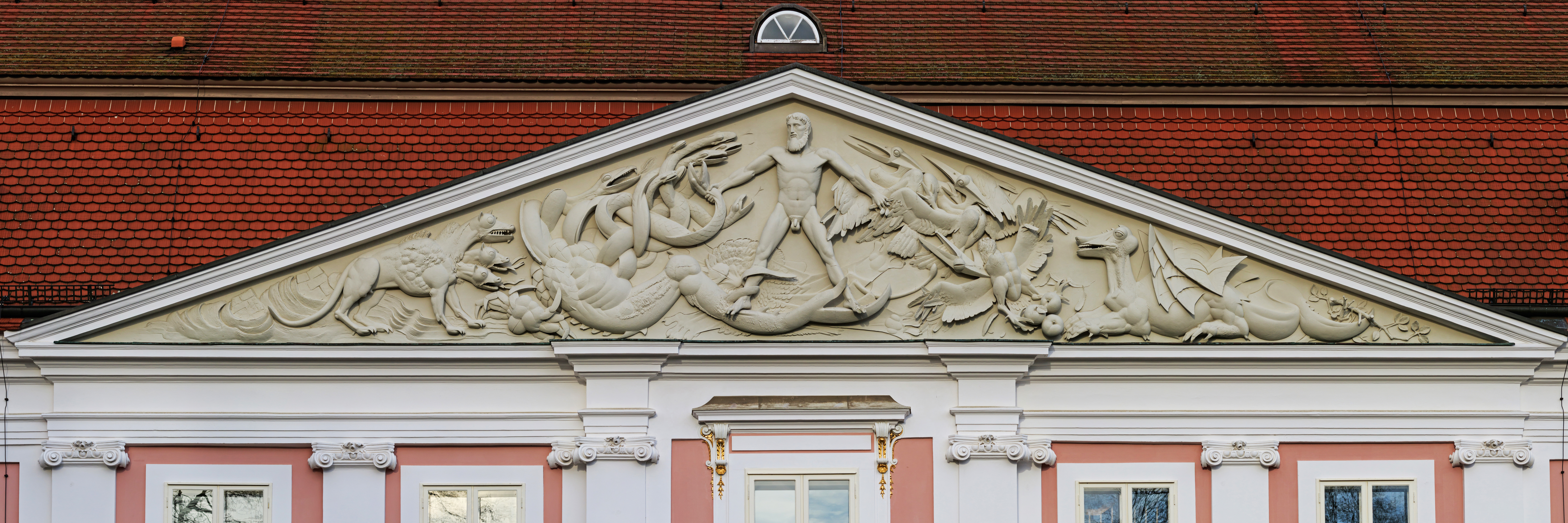
Frieze above the main entrance

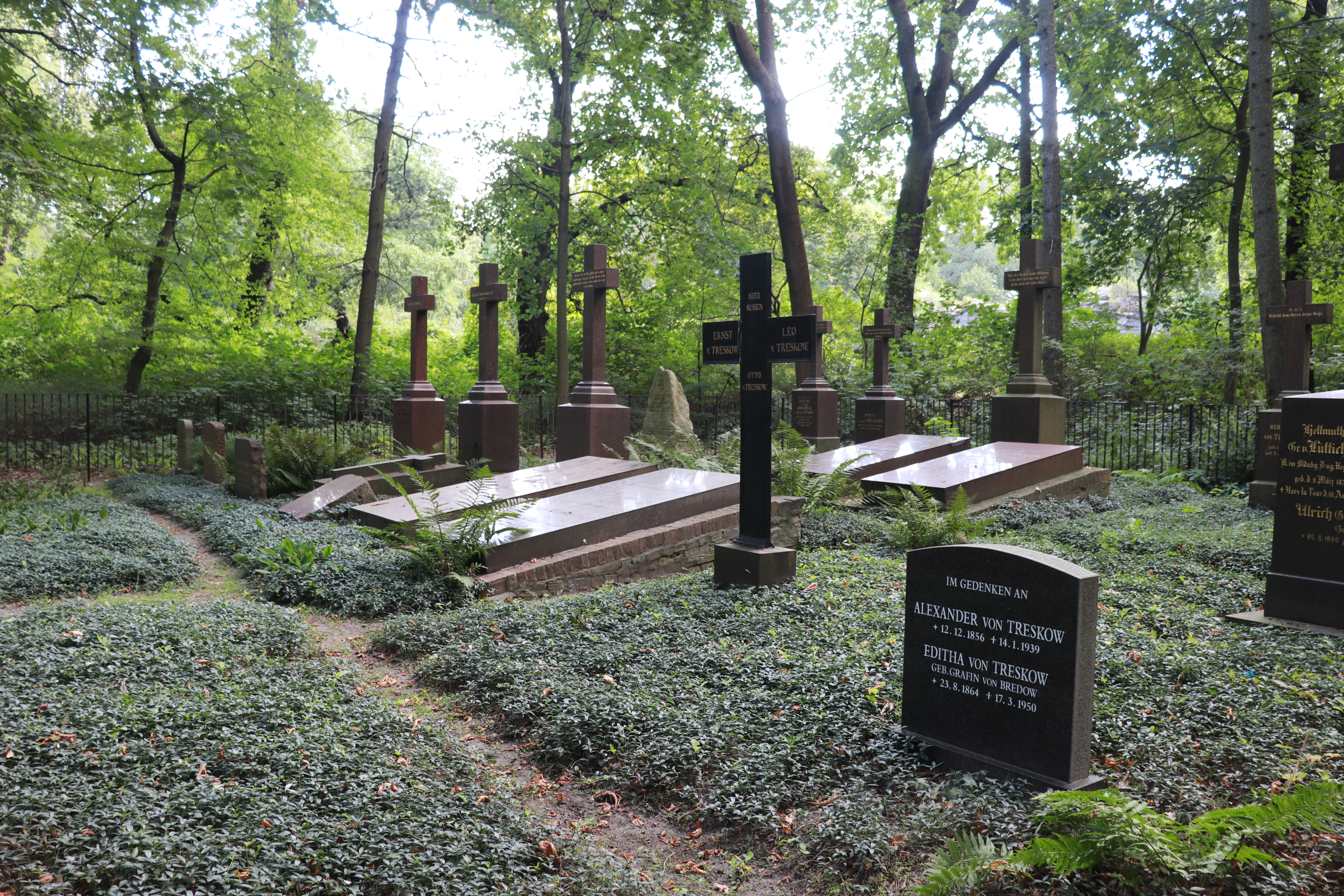
Treskow family burial ground

== Bibliography ==
- Stiftung Stadtmuseum Berlin. "Vom Lustschloss zum Museumsschloss. Schloss Friedrichsfelde und seine wechselvolle Geschichte". Berlin, 2002.
- Klaus-Dieter Stefan. "Friedrichsfelde – Der Ort. Das Schloss. Die Geschichte." Hendrik Bäßler Verlag, 2014. ISBN 978-3-930388-91-2.
