= Grodno (disambiguation) =

Grodno a city in Belarus.

Grodno may also refer to:

== Belarus ==
- Grodno Airport, Belarus
- Grodno district, Belarus
- Grodno Governorate, Russian Empire
- Grodno region, Belarus

== Poland ==
- Grodno County
- Grodno, Greater Poland Voivodeship (west-central Poland)
- Grodno, Toruń County in Kuyavian-Pomeranian Voivodeship (north-central Poland)
- Grodno, Włocławek County in Kuyavian-Pomeranian Voivodeship (north-central Poland)
- Grodno, Łódź Voivodeship (central Poland)
- Grodno, West Pomeranian Voivodeship (north-west Poland)
- Grodno Drugie, "second Grodno", Włocławek County

== See also ==
- Grodno Castle (disambiguation)
- Battle of Grodno (disambiguation)
