= Zieleniec =

Zieleniec may refer to:

- Josef Zieleniec, a Czech Member of the European Parliament

and the following places in Poland:

- Zieleniec, a district of the town of Duszniki-Zdrój
- Zieleniec, a district of the town of Gorzów Wielkopolski
- Zieleniec, Kuyavian-Pomeranian Voivodeship (central Poland)
- Zieleniec, Łódź Voivodeship (central Poland)
- Zieleniec, Lublin Voivodeship (east Poland)
- Zieleniec, Gostynin County in Masovian Voivodeship (central Poland)
- Zieleniec, Kozienice County in Masovian Voivodeship (east-central Poland)
- Zieleniec, Węgrów County in Masovian Voivodeship (east-central Poland)
- Zieleniec, Greater Poland Voivodeship (central Poland)
- Zieleniec, Lubusz Voivodeship (west Poland)
- Zieleniec, Opole Voivodeship (south Poland)
- Zieleniec, Warmian-Masurian Voivodeship (north Poland)
