= Ignacewo =

Ignacewo may refer to the following places:

- Ignacewo, Kuyavian-Pomeranian Voivodeship (north-central Poland)
- Ignacewo, Masovian Voivodeship (east-central Poland)
- Ignacewo, Podlaskie Voivodeship (north-east Poland)
- Ignacewo, Koło County in Greater Poland Voivodeship (west-central Poland)
- Ignacewo, Konin County in Greater Poland Voivodeship (west-central Poland)
- Ignacewo, Kościan County in Greater Poland Voivodeship (west-central Poland)
- Ignacewo, Wągrowiec County in Greater Poland Voivodeship (west-central Poland)
