= Rdutów =

Rdutów may refer to the following villages in Poland:

- Rdutów, Greater Poland Voivodeship (west-central Poland)
- Rdutów, Łódź Voivodeship (central Poland)
