= Grochów (disambiguation) =

Grochów is a suburb of Warsaw.

Grochów may also refer to:

- Grochów, Łódź Voivodeship (central Poland)
- Grochów, Sokołów County in Masovian Voivodeship (east-central Poland)
- Grochów, Lubusz Voivodeship (west Poland)
- Grochów, West Pomeranian Voivodeship (north-west Poland)
