= Briesen =

Briesen may refer to the following places:

== In Brandenburg, Germany ==
- Briesen (Spreewald), in the Spree-Neiße district
- Briesen (Mark), in the Oder-Spree district
- A part of Friesack, in the Havelland district
- A part of Halbe, in the Dahme-Spreewald district

== German alternates ==
- An older name of Brezno, Slovakia
- An older name of Brzeźno, Człuchów in Poland
- An older name of Wąbrzeźno, Poland
- An older name of Brzeżno, a village in Świdwin County, West Pomeranian Voivodeship, in north-western Poland
- An older name of Brzeźno, a village in Gmina Skoki, within Wągrowiec County, Greater Poland Voivodeship, Poland

== Old district ==
- An old district in West Prussia
