= Pomarzanki =

- Village
- Location within Poland
- Coordinates: 52°39′53″N 17°19′42″E
- Country: Poland
- Voivodeship: Greater Poland
- County: Wągrowiec
- Gmina: Skoki

Pomarzanki [pɔmaˈʐanki] is a village in the administrative district of Gmina Skoki, within Wągrowiec County, Greater Poland Voivodeship, in west-central Poland. The city's average annual temperature is 7.9 degrees C. It receives about 541 mm of rain annually.

Pomarzanki had belonged to the Roman Catholic parish in Popowo Kościelne, but since 1 May 1925 it has belonged to the parish in Jabłkowo.
