= Battle of Niemen =

Battle of Niemen, Neman, Nemunas or the Niemen may refer to:

- Battle of Darsūniškis, Great Northern War, 1702
- French invasion of Russia, Napoleonic Wars, 1812
- Battle of Augustów (1914) (25–28 September), World War I
- Battle of the Niemen River, Polish-Soviet War, 1920
- Battle of the Niemen River (1944) (Vilnius Offensive), World War II, 1944

== See also ==
- Battle of Grodno (disambiguation)
- Battle of Memel (disambiguation)
