= Dzwonowo Leśne =

- Settlement
- Location within Poland
- Coordinates: 52°34′N 17°8′E
- Country: Poland
- Voivodeship: Greater Poland
- County: Wągrowiec
- Gmina: Skoki

Dzwonowo Leśne [d͡zvɔˈnɔvɔ ˈlɛɕnɛ] is a settlement in the administrative district of Gmina Skoki, within Wągrowiec County, Greater Poland Voivodeship, in west-central Poland. It is in the Puszcza Zielonka forest, to the east of Dzwonowo. (The suffix Leśne in the name means "(of the) forest".)
