= Chociszewo =

Chociszewo may refer to the following places:

- Chociszewo, Greater Poland Voivodeship (west-central Poland)
- Chociszewo, Kuyavian-Pomeranian Voivodeship (north-central Poland)
- Chociszewo, Masovian Voivodeship (east-central Poland)
- Chociszewo, Lubusz Voivodeship (west Poland)
