= Gąsiory =

Gąsiory may refer to the following places:

- Gąsiory, Greater Poland Voivodeship (west-central Poland)
- Gąsiory, Lublin Voivodeship (east Poland)
- Gąsiory, Masovian Voivodeship (east-central Poland)
