= Imielno =

Imielno may refer to the following places:

- Imielno, Gniezno County in Greater Poland Voivodeship (west-central Poland)
- Imielno, Łódź Voivodeship (central Poland)
- Imielno, Świętokrzyskie Voivodeship (south-central Poland)
- Imielno, Słupca County in Greater Poland Voivodeship (west-central Poland)
