= Gmina Nowe Ostrowy =

Gmina Nowe Ostrowy Nowe Ostrowy Commune
- Gmina
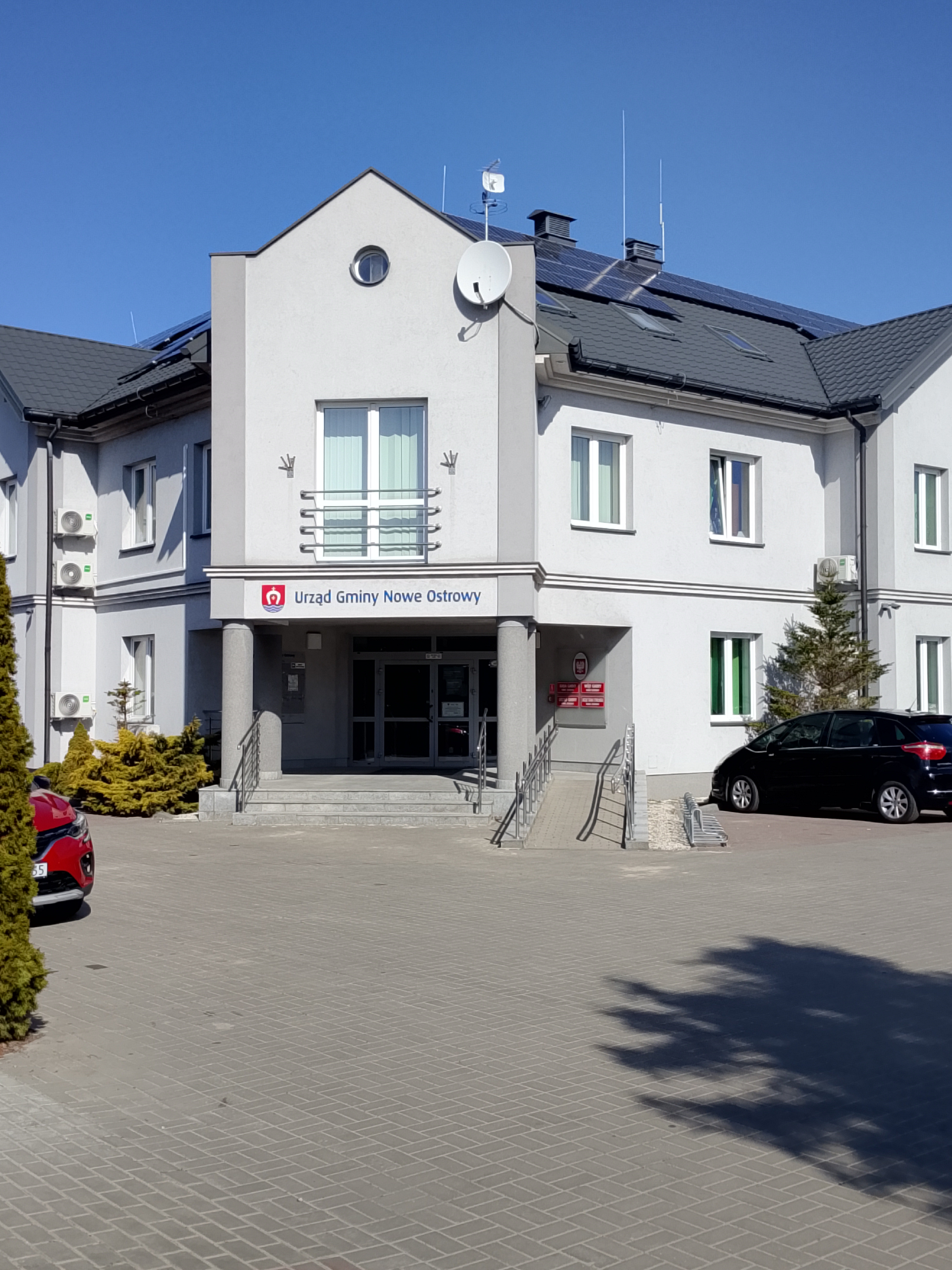
- Interactive map of Gmina Nowe Ostrowy
- Coordinates (Nowe Ostrowy): 52°17′56″N 19°11′28″E
- Country: Poland
- Voivodeship: Łódź
- County: Kutno
- Seat: Nowe Ostrowy

Area
  - Total: 71.56 km^{2} (27.63 sq mi)

Population (2006)
  - Total: 3,870
  - Density: 54.1/km^{2} (140/sq mi)
- Website: www.noweostrowy.pl

Gmina Nowe Ostrowy is a rural gmina (administrative district) in Kutno County, Łódź Voivodeship, in central Poland. Its seat is the village of Nowe Ostrowy, which lies 14 kilometres (9 mi) north-west of Kutno and 61 km (38 mi) north of the regional capital Łódź.

The gmina covers an area of 71.56 square kilometres (27.6 sq mi), and as of 2006 its total population was 3,870.

== Villages ==
Gmina Nowe Ostrowy contains the villages and settlements of:

- Błota
- Bzówki
- Bzówki PGR
- Grochów
- Grochówek
- Grodno
- Grodno Drugie
- Imielinek
- Imielinek Drugi
- Imielno
- Kały-Towarzystwo
- Kołomia
- Lipiny
- Miksztal
- Niechcianów
- Nowa Wieś
- Nowe Ostrowy
- Nowe Ostrowy PKP
- Ostrowy
- Ostrowy PGR
- Ostrowy-Cukrownia
- Perna
- Rdutów
- Wola Pierowa
- Wołodrza
- Zieleniec

== Neighbouring gminas ==
Gmina Nowe Ostrowy is bordered by the gminas of Dąbrowice, Krośniewice, Kutno, Łanięta and Lubień Kujawski.
