= Błota, Kutno County =

Village in Gmina Nowe Ostrowy, Poland

Błota
- Village
- Location within Poland
- Coordinates: 52°18′39″N 19°13′46″E
- Country: Poland
- Voivodeship: Łódź
- County: Kutno
- Gmina: Nowe Ostrowy

Błota [ˈbwɔta] is a village in the administrative district of Gmina Nowe Ostrowy, within Kutno County, Łódź Voivodeship, in central Poland.
