= Gmina Skoki =

Gmina Skoki Skoki Commune
- Gmina
- Flag Coat of arms
- Interactive map of Gmina Skoki
- Coordinates (Skoki): 52°40′N 17°9′E
- Country: Poland
- Voivodeship: Greater Poland
- County: Wągrowiec
- Seat: Skoki

Area
  - Total: 198.52 km^{2} (76.65 sq mi)

Population (2006)
  - Total: 8,749
  - Density: 44.07/km^{2} (114.1/sq mi)
  - Urban: 3,866
  - Rural: 4,883
- Website: http://gmina-skoki.pl

Gmina Skoki is an urban-rural gmina (administrative district) in Wągrowiec County, Greater Poland Voivodeship, in west-central Poland. Its seat is the town of Skoki, which lies approximately 16 kilometres (10 mi) south of Wągrowiec and 34 km (21 mi) north-east of the regional capital Poznań.

The gmina covers an area of 198.52 square kilometres (76.6 sq mi), and as of 2006 its total population is 8,749 (out of which the population of Skoki amounts to 3,866, and the population of the rural part of the gmina is 4,883).

The gmina contains part of the protected area called Puszcza Zielonka Landscape Park.

== Villages ==
Apart from the town of Skoki, Gmina Skoki contains the villages and settlements of Antoniewo Górne, Antoniewo-Leśniczówka, Bliżyce, Brzeźno, Budziszewice, Chociszewko, Chociszewo, Dzwonowo, Dzwonowo Leśne, Glinno, Grzybowice, Grzybowo, Ignacewo, Jabłkowo, Jagniewice, Kakulin, Kuszewo, Lechlin, Lechlin-Huby, Lechlinek, Łosiniec, Miączynek, Młynki, Nadmłyn, Niedarzyn, Niedźwiedziny, Pawłowo Skockie, Pomarzanki, Potrzanowo, Raczkowo, Rakojady, Rejowiec, Rościnno, Roszkówko, Roszkowo, Sława Wielkopolska, Sławica, Stawiany, Szczodrochowo and Wysoka.

== Neighbouring gminas ==
Gmina Skoki is bordered by the gminas of Kiszkowo, Kłecko, Mieścisko, Murowana Goślina, Rogoźno and Wągrowiec.
