= Wola Pierowa =

- Village
- Location within Poland
- Coordinates: 52°20′N 19°11′E
- Country: Poland
- Voivodeship: Łódź
- County: Kutno
- Gmina: Nowe Ostrowy

Wola Pierowa [ˈvɔla pjɛˈrɔva] is a village in the administrative district of Gmina Nowe Ostrowy, within Kutno County, Łódź Voivodeship, in central Poland.
