= Nowe Ostrowy =

- Village
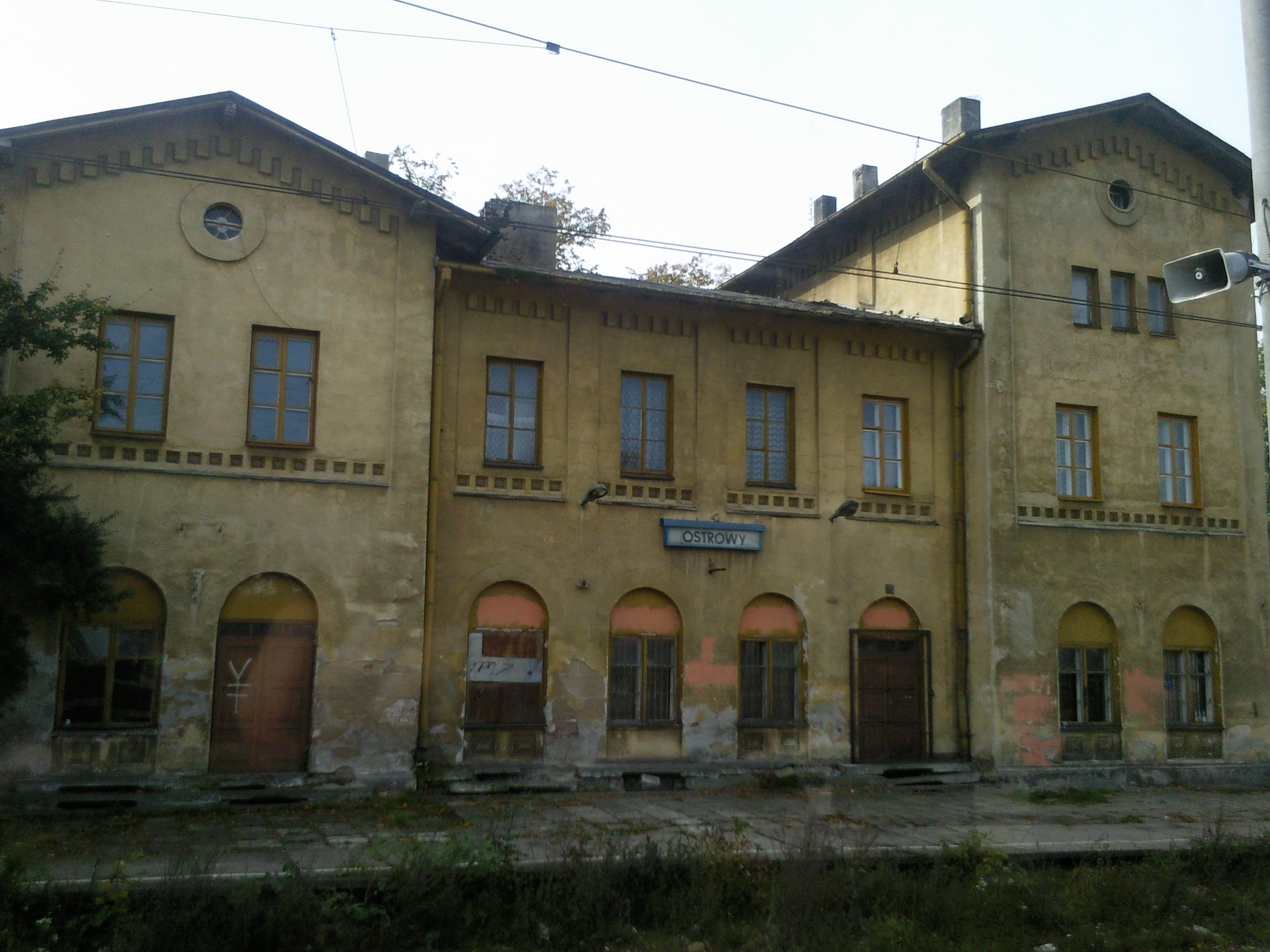
- Railway station

- Location within Poland
- Coordinates: 52°17′56″N 19°11′28″E
- Country: Poland
- Voivodeship: Łódź
- County: Kutno
- Gmina: Nowe Ostrowy

Nowe Ostrowy [ˈnɔvɛ ɔsˈtrɔvɨ] is a village in Kutno County, Łódź Voivodeship, in central Poland. It is the seat of the gmina (administrative district) called Gmina Nowe Ostrowy.
