= Stawiany, Greater Poland Voivodeship =

Stawiany
- Village
- Location within Poland
- Coordinates: 52°37′12″N 17°12′16″E
- Country: Poland
- Voivodeship: Greater Poland
- County: Wągrowiec
- Gmina: Skoki
- Population: 156

Stawiany [staˈvjanɨ] is a village in the administrative district of Gmina Skoki, within Wągrowiec County, Greater Poland Voivodeship, in west-central Poland.
