= Raczkowo =

- Village
- Location within Poland
- Coordinates: 52°39′N 17°15′E
- Country: Poland
- Voivodeship: Greater Poland
- County: Wągrowiec
- Gmina: Skoki

Raczkowo [rat͡ʂˈkɔvɔ] is a village in the administrative district of Gmina Skoki, within Wągrowiec County, Greater Poland Voivodeship, in west-central Poland.

The village has a church which lies on the Wooden Churches Trail around Puszcza Zielonka.

== History ==
It was first mentioned in 1252 under the name Raskovcze. The name comes from the name of the owner, Raczek. In 1389, the recorded owner of Raczkowo was Florian Grochała Raczkowski of the Nałęcz coat of arms.
