= Szczodrochowo, Wągrowiec County =

Szczodrochowo
- Village
- Location within Poland
- Coordinates: 52°38′N 17°10′E
- Country: Poland
- Voivodeship: Greater Poland
- County: Wągrowiec
- Gmina: Skoki

Szczodrochowo ([ʂt͡ʂɔdrɔˈxɔvɔ]; German: Deutschfeld) is a village in the administrative district of Gmina Skoki, within Wągrowiec County, Greater Poland Voivodeship, in west-central Poland.
