= Chodów, Greater Poland Voivodeship =

Chodów
- Village
- Location within Poland
- Coordinates: 52°15′N 19°1′E
- Country: Poland
- Voivodeship: Greater Poland
- County: Koło
- Gmina: Chodów

Population
  - Total: 830
- Time zone: UTC+1 (CET)
  - Summer (DST): UTC+2 (CEST)
- Vehicle registration: PKL

Chodów [ˈxɔduf] is a village in Koło County, Greater Poland Voivodeship, in central Poland. It is the seat of the gmina (administrative district) called Gmina Chodów.
