= Grochówek =

- Village
- Location within Poland
- Coordinates: 52°16′39″N 19°16′17″E
- Country: Poland
- Voivodeship: Łódź
- County: Kutno
- Gmina: Nowe Ostrowy
- Population: 730

Grochówek [ɡrɔˈxuvɛk] is a village in the administrative district of Gmina Nowe Ostrowy, in Kutno County, Łódź Voivodeship, central Poland.
