= Antoniewo-Leśniczówka =

- Settlement
- Location within Poland
- Coordinates: 52°39′39″N 17°11′10″E
- Country: Poland
- Voivodeship: Greater Poland
- County: Wągrowiec
- Gmina: Skoki

Antoniewo-Leśniczówka (Polish pronunciation: [antɔˈɲɛvɔ lɛɕɲiˈtʂufka]) is a settlement in the administrative district of Gmina Skoki, within Wągrowiec County, Greater Poland Voivodeship, in west-central Poland.
