= Imielinek Drugi =

- Village
- Country: Poland
- Voivodeship: Łódź
- County: Kutno
- Gmina: Nowe Ostrowy

Imielinek Drugi [imjɛˈlinɛk ˈdruɡi] is a village in the administrative district of Gmina Nowe Ostrowy, within Kutno County, Łódź Voivodeship, in central Poland.
