= Pawłowo Skockie =

- Village
- Location within Poland
- Coordinates: 52°36′N 17°12′E
- Country: Poland
- Voivodeship: Greater Poland
- County: Wągrowiec
- Gmina: Skoki

Pawłowo Skockie ([paˈvwɔvɔ ˈskɔt͡skʲɛ]; German: Pawlowo bei Schokken) is a village in the administrative district of Gmina Skoki, within Wągrowiec County, Greater Poland Voivodeship, in west-central Poland.
