= Perna, Poland =

Perna
- Village
- Location within Poland
- Coordinates: 52°17′21″N 19°10′35″E
- Country: Poland
- Voivodeship: Łódź
- County: Kutno
- Gmina: Nowe Ostrowy

Perna [ˈpɛrna] is a village in the administrative district of Gmina Nowe Ostrowy, within Kutno County, Łódź Voivodeship, in central Poland.
