= Dzierzbice =

- Village
- Location within Poland
- Coordinates: 52°16′36″N 18°59′39″E
- Country: Poland
- Voivodeship: Greater Poland
- County: Koło
- Gmina: Chodów

Population
  - Total: 280
- Time zone: UTC+1 (CET)
  - Summer (DST): UTC+2 (CEST)
- Vehicle registration: PKL

Dzierzbice [d͡ʑɛʐˈbit͡sɛ] is a village in the administrative district of Gmina Chodów, within Koło County, Greater Poland Voivodeship, in central Poland.
