= Battle of Memel (disambiguation) =

Battle of Memel was a 1944 battle between Soviet Union and Nazi Germany.

The Battle of Memel or Battle of Klaipėda might also refer to:

- Battle of Memel (1257), between the Samogitians and the Livonian Order
- Battle of Memel (1323), between the Samogitians and the Livonian Order

== See also ==
- Battle of Niemen (disambiguation)
