= Grzybowo, Wągrowiec County =

Grzybowo
- Village
- Location within Poland
- Coordinates: 52°42′N 17°6′E
- Country: Poland
- Voivodeship: Greater Poland
- County: Wągrowiec
- Gmina: Skoki

Grzybowo [ɡʐɨˈbɔvɔ] is a village in the administrative district of Gmina Skoki, within Wągrowiec County, Greater Poland Voivodeship, in west-central Poland.
