= Rakojady, Greater Poland Voivodeship =

Rakojady
- Village
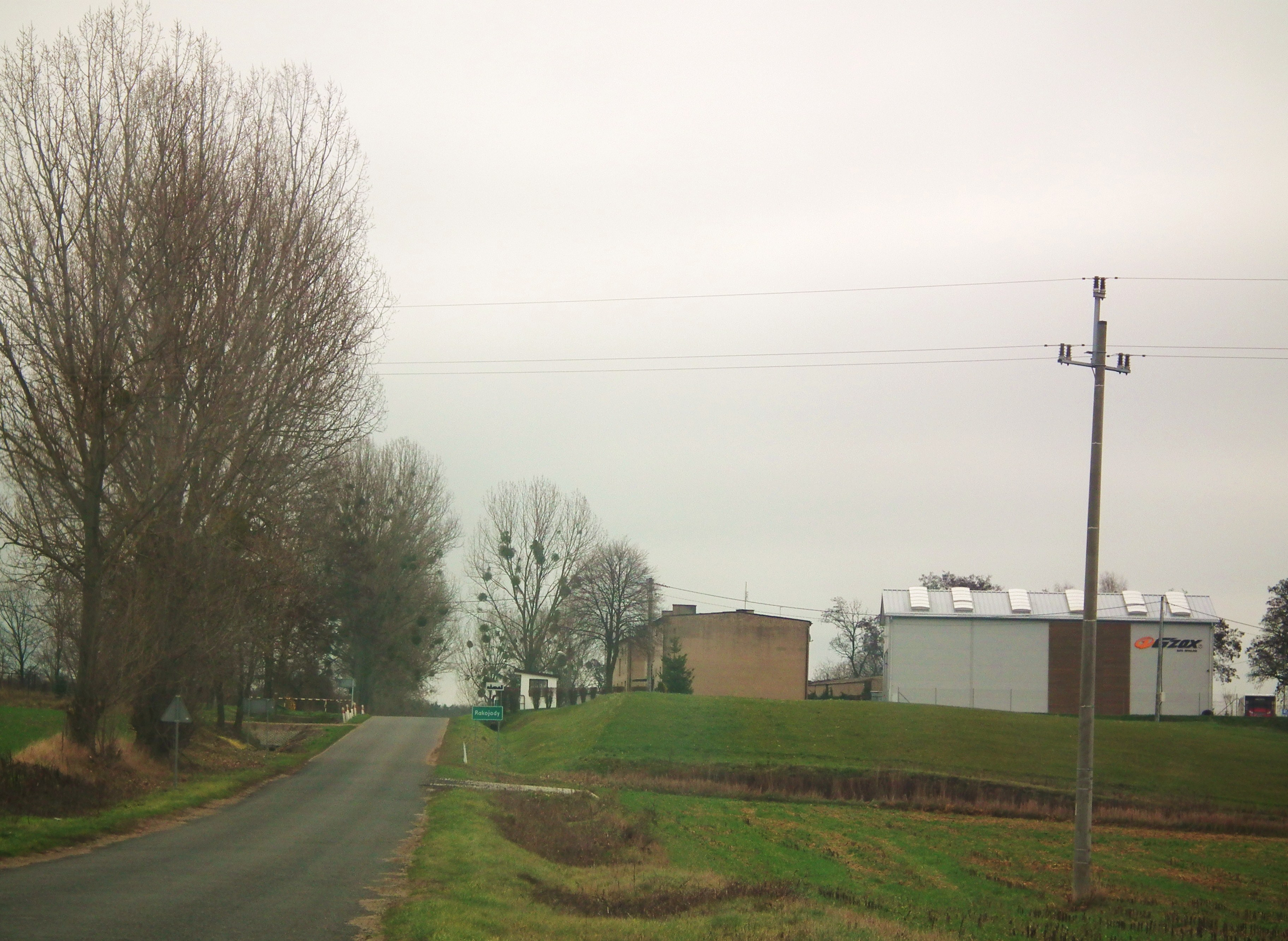
- Street of Rakojady

- Location within Poland
- Coordinates: 52°40′57″N 17°11′50″E
- Country: Poland
- Voivodeship: Greater Poland
- County: Wągrowiec
- Gmina: Skoki

Rakojady [rakɔˈjadɨ] is a village in the administrative district of Gmina Skoki, within Wągrowiec County, Greater Poland Voivodeship, in west-central Poland.
