= Chociszewko =

- Settlement
- Location within Poland
- Coordinates: 52°41′59″N 17°13′13″E
- Country: Poland
- Voivodeship: Greater Poland
- County: Wągrowiec
- Gmina: Skoki

Chociszewko [xɔt͡ɕiˈʂɛfkɔ] is a settlement in the administrative district of Gmina Skoki, within Wągrowiec County, Greater Poland Voivodeship, in west-central Poland.
