= Antoniewo Górne =

- Village
- Location within Poland
- Coordinates: 52°39′0″N 17°12′53″E
- Country: Poland
- Voivodeship: Greater Poland
- County: Wągrowiec
- Gmina: Skoki
- Population: 19

Antoniewo Górne [antɔˈɲɛvɔ ˈɡurnɛ] is a village in the administrative district of Gmina Skoki, within Wągrowiec County, Greater Poland Voivodeship, in west-central Poland.
