= Grzybowice =

- Village
- Location within Poland
- Coordinates: 52°43′13″N 17°7′19″E
- Country: Poland
- Voivodeship: Greater Poland
- County: Wągrowiec
- Gmina: Skoki
- Population: 37

Grzybowice [ɡʐɨbɔˈvit͡sɛ] is a village in the administrative district of Gmina Skoki, within Wągrowiec County, Greater Poland Voivodeship, in west-central Poland.
