= Lechlinek =

- Settlement
- Location within Poland
- Coordinates: 52°43′11″N 17°10′07″E
- Country: Poland
- Voivodeship: Greater Poland
- County: Wągrowiec
- Gmina: Skoki
- Population: 73

Lechlinek [lɛˈxlinɛk] is a settlement in the administrative district of Gmina Skoki, within Wągrowiec County, Greater Poland Voivodeship, in west-central Poland.
