= Łosiniec, Greater Poland Voivodeship =

Łosiniec
- Village
- Location in Poland
- Coordinates: 52°43′30″N 17°12′14″E
- Country: Poland
- Voivodeship: Greater Poland
- County: Wągrowiec
- Gmina: Skoki
- Elevation: 90 m (300 ft)

Population (2021)
  - Total: 349
- Postal code: 62-285
- Area code: +48 61
- Vehicle registration: PWA
- SIMC: 0594726

Łosiniec ([wɔˈɕiɲɛt͡s]; German: Losinjetz or Loschinjetz) is a village in the administrative district of Gmina Skoki, within Wągrowiec County, Greater Poland Voivodeship, in west-central Poland.
