= Lechlin-Huby =

- Settlement
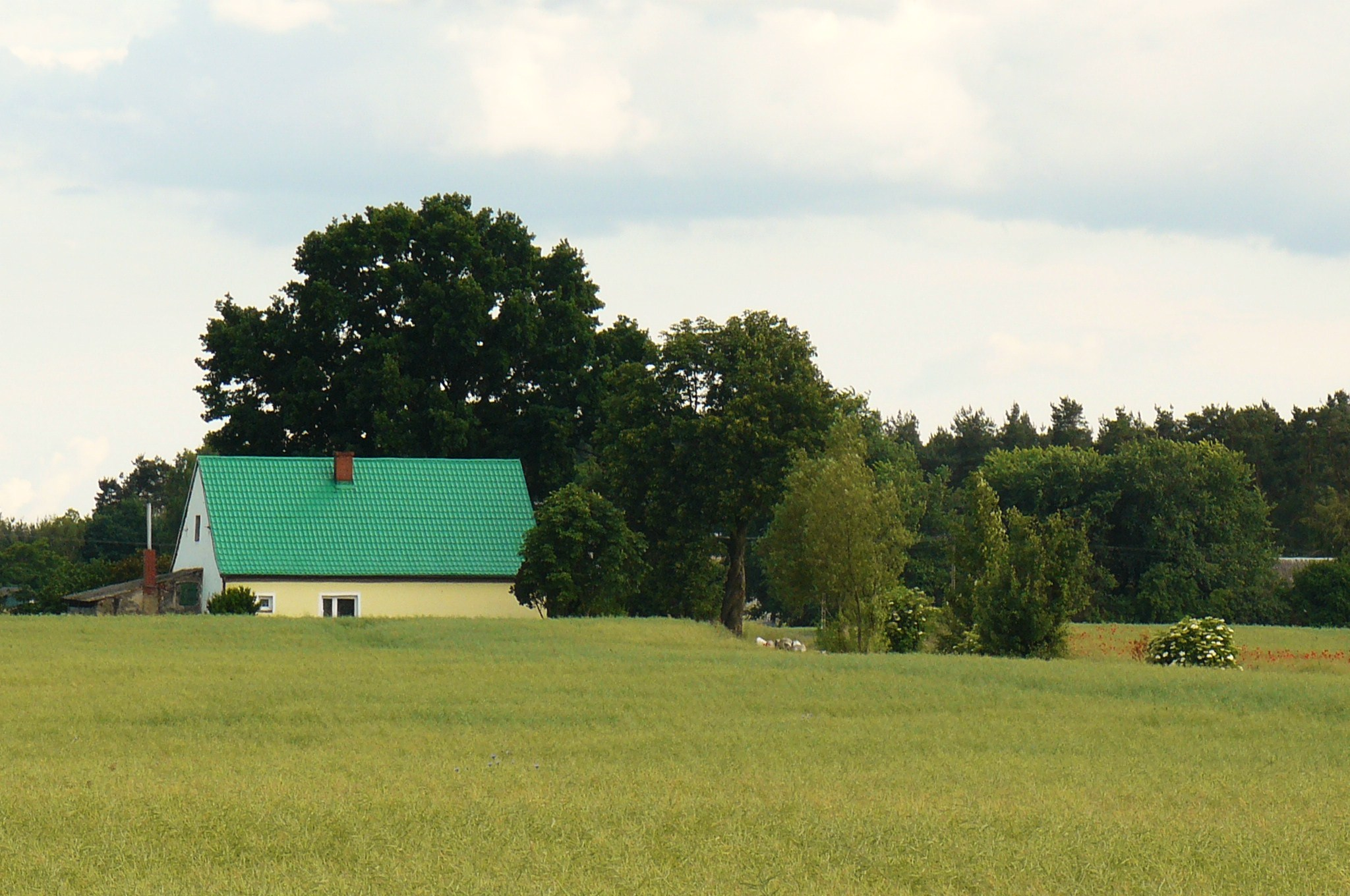
- View in Lechlińskie-Huby

- Location within Poland
- Coordinates: 52°42′01″N 17°07′42″E
- Country: Poland
- Voivodeship: Greater Poland
- County: Wągrowiec
- Gmina: Skoki

Lechlin-Huby [ˈlɛxlin ˈxubɨ] is a settlement in the administrative district of Gmina Skoki, within Wągrowiec County, Greater Poland Voivodeship, in west-central Poland.
