= Rejowiec, Greater Poland Voivodeship =

Rejowiec
- Village
- Location within Poland
- Coordinates: 52°37′N 17°10′E
- Country: Poland
- Voivodeship: Greater Poland
- County: Wągrowiec
- Gmina: Skoki

Rejowiec (Polish: [rɛˈjɔvjɛt͡s]; also called Rejowiec Poznański; German: Revier) is a village in the administrative district of Gmina Skoki, within Wągrowiec County, Greater Poland Voivodeship, in west-central Poland.

The village was founded by Polish diplomat Andrzej Rej in 1626 for Protestant settlers from Brandenburg and Pomerania.

The village has a church which is included on the Wooden Churches Trail around Puszcza Zielonka. Former church in the village was constructed in the first half of the 17th century. It was built of larch wood for Calvinist community. The present shape of the building originates in the 1820 reconstruction. There are coats of arms of the Reformed nobles displayed in the church porch. Rejowiec is also the site of a large fuel terminal.
