= Ostrowy, Łódź Voivodeship =

Ostrowy
- Village
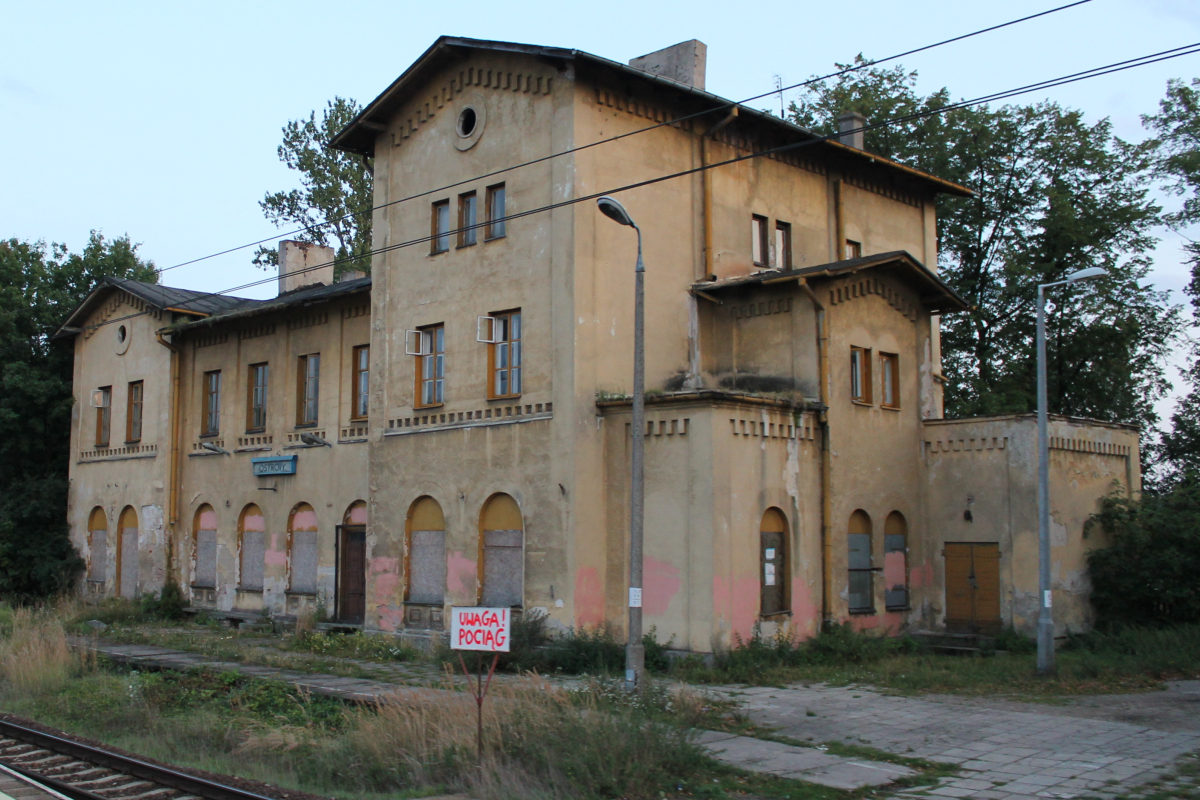
- Train station

- Location within Poland
- Coordinates: 52°18′13″N 19°9′42″E
- Country: Poland
- Voivodeship: Łódź
- County: Kutno
- Gmina: Nowe Ostrowy
- Population: 1,200
- Website: http://www.noweostrowy.pl

Ostrowy [ɔsˈtrɔvɨ] is a village in the administrative district of Gmina Nowe Ostrowy, within Kutno County, Łódź Voivodeship, in central Poland.
