= Nadmłyn =

- Settlement
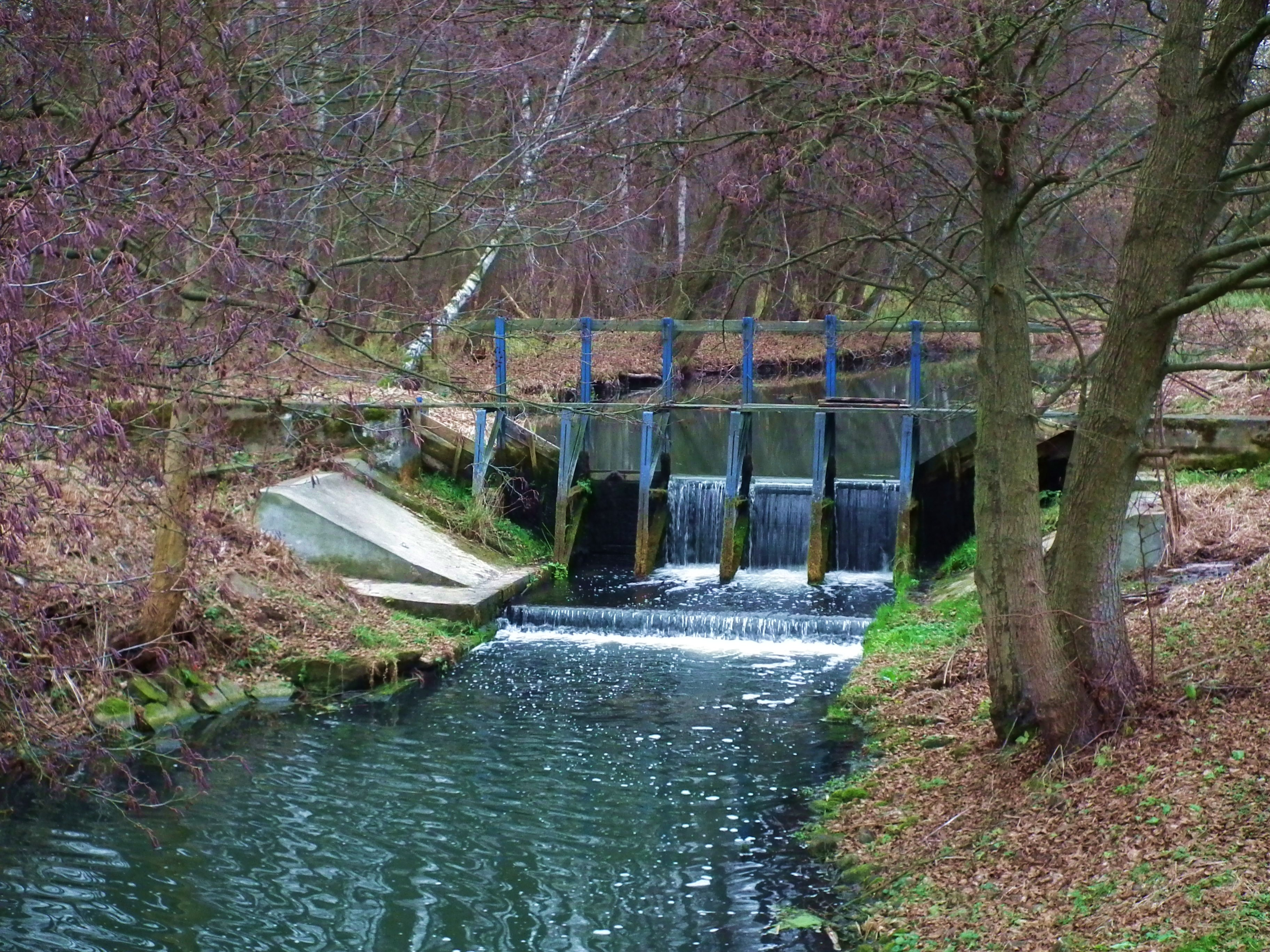

- Location within Poland
- Coordinates: 52°40′42″N 17°12′39″E
- Country: Poland
- Voivodeship: Greater Poland
- County: Wągrowiec
- Gmina: Skoki

Nadmłyn [ˈnadmwɨn] is a settlement in the administrative district of Gmina Skoki, within Wągrowiec County, Greater Poland Voivodeship, in west-central Poland.
