= Kołomia, Łódź Voivodeship =

Kołomia
- Village
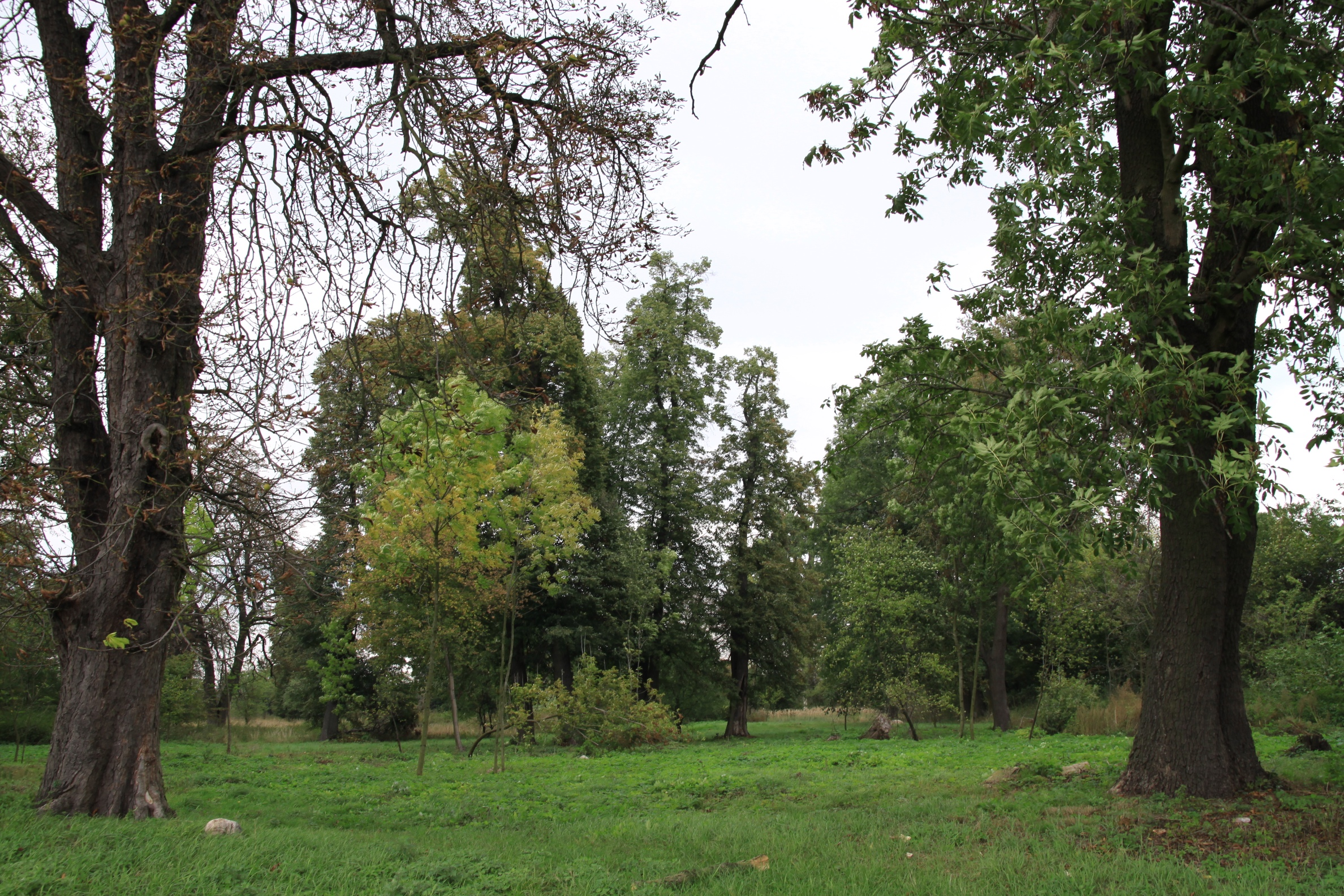
- Park

- Location within Poland
- Coordinates: 52°20′42″N 19°11′39″E
- Country: Poland
- Voivodeship: Łódź
- County: Kutno
- Gmina: Nowe Ostrowy

Kołomia [kɔˈwɔmja] is a village in the administrative district of Gmina Nowe Ostrowy, within Kutno County, Łódź Voivodeship, in central Poland.
