= Czerwonka, Koło County =

Czerwonka
- Village
- Location within Poland
- Coordinates: 52°14′58″N 19°3′26″E
- Country: Poland
- Voivodeship: Greater Poland
- County: Koło
- Gmina: Chodów
- Time zone: UTC+1 (CET)
  - Summer (DST): UTC+2 (CEST)

Czerwonka [t͡ʂɛrˈvɔnka] is a village in the administrative district of Gmina Chodów, within Koło County, Greater Poland Voivodeship, in central Poland.
