= Kały-Towarzystwo =

- Village
- Location within Poland
- Coordinates: 52°16′59″N 19°17′39″E
- Country: Poland
- Voivodeship: Łódź
- County: Kutno
- Gmina: Nowe Ostrowy

Kały-Towarzystwo [ˈkawɨ tɔvaˈʐɨstfɔ] is a village in the administrative district of Gmina Nowe Ostrowy, within Kutno County, Łódź Voivodeship, in central Poland.
