= Niedarzyn, Greater Poland Voivodeship =

Niedarzyn
- Settlement
- Location within Poland
- Coordinates: 52°38′36″N 17°12′47″E
- Country: Poland
- Voivodeship: Greater Poland
- County: Wągrowiec
- Gmina: Skoki
- Population: 13

Niedarzyn [ɲɛˈdaʐɨn] is a settlement in the administrative district of Gmina Skoki, within Wągrowiec County, Greater Poland Voivodeship, in central-west Poland.
