= Jagniewice =

- Village
- Location within Poland
- Coordinates: 52°38′38″N 17°15′54″E
- Country: Poland
- Voivodeship: Greater Poland
- County: Wągrowiec
- Gmina: Skoki
- Population: 132

Jagniewice [jaɡɲɛˈvit͡sɛ] is a village in the administrative district of Gmina Skoki, within Wągrowiec County, Greater Poland Voivodeship, in west-central Poland.
