= Lipiny, Kutno County =

Lipiny
- Village
- Location within Poland
- Coordinates: 52°19′4″N 19°7′50″E
- Country: Poland
- Voivodeship: Łódź
- County: Kutno
- Gmina: Nowe Ostrowy

Lipiny [liˈpinɨ] is a village in the administrative district of Gmina Nowe Ostrowy, within Kutno County, Łódź Voivodeship, in central Poland.
