= Chrzanowo, Greater Poland Voivodeship =

Chrzanowo
- Village
- Location within Poland
- Coordinates: 52°15′08″N 19°03′42″E
- Country: Poland
- Voivodeship: Greater Poland
- County: Koło
- Gmina: Chodów
- Time zone: UTC+1 (CET)
  - Summer (DST): UTC+2 (CEST)
- Vehicle registration: PKL

Chrzanowo [xʂaˈnɔvɔ] is a village in the administrative district of Gmina Chodów, within Koło County, Greater Poland Voivodeship, in central Poland.
