= Nowa Wieś, Gmina Nowe Ostrowy =

Nowa Wieś
- Village
- Location within Poland
- Coordinates: 52°19′7″N 19°9′11″E
- Country: Poland
- Voivodeship: Łódź
- County: Kutno
- Gmina: Nowe Ostrowy
- Population: 40

Nowa Wieś [ˈnɔva ˈvjɛɕ] is a village in the administrative district of Gmina Nowe Ostrowy, within Kutno County, Łódź Voivodeship, in central Poland.
