= Gmina Chodów =

Gmina Chodów Chodów Commune
- Gmina
- Flag Coat of arms

- Coordinates (Chodów): 52°15′N 19°1′E
- Country: Poland
- Voivodeship: Greater Poland
- County: Koło
- Seat: Chodów

Area
  - Total: 77.97 km^{2} (30.10 sq mi)

Population (2006)
  - Total: 3,475
  - Density: 44.57/km^{2} (115.4/sq mi)
- Time zone: UTC+1 (CET)
  - Summer (DST): UTC+2 (CEST)
- Vehicle registration: PKL

Gmina Chodów is a rural gmina (administrative district) in Koło County, Greater Poland Voivodeship, in central Poland. Its seat is the village of Chodów, which lies 27 kilometres (17 mi) east of Koło and 144 km (89 mi) east of the regional capital Poznań.

The gmina covers an area of 77.97 square kilometres (30.1 sq mi). Its total population was 3,475 in 2006 .

== Villages ==
Gmina Chodów contains the villages and settlements of Aleksandrów, Bowyczyny, Budy-Gole, Chodów, Chrzanowo, Czerwonka, Długie, Domaników, Dziegielewo, Dzierzbice, Elizanów, Gąsiory, Ignacewo, Jagiełłów, Kaleń Duża, Kaleń Mała, Kocewia Duża, Koserz, Niwki, Nowe Niwki, Nowy Koserz, Nowy Rdutów, Pniewo, Rdutów, Stanisławów, Studzień, Szołajdy, Turzynów, Wewierz, Wojciechowo and Zieleniec.

== Neighbouring gminas ==
Gmina Chodów is bordered by the gminas of Dąbrowice, Daszyna, Grabów, Kłodawa, Krośniewice and Przedecz.
