= Roszkowo, Wągrowiec County =

Roszkowo
- Village
- Location within Poland
- Coordinates: 52°42′N 17°11′E
- Country: Poland
- Voivodeship: Greater Poland
- County: Wągrowiec
- Gmina: Skoki
- Population: 111

Roszkowo [rɔʂˈkɔvɔ] is a village in the administrative district of Gmina Skoki, within Wągrowiec County, Greater Poland Voivodeship, in west-central Poland.
