= Miączynek, Greater Poland Voivodeship =

Miączynek
- Settlement
- Location within Poland
- Coordinates: 52°36′N 17°10′E
- Country: Poland
- Voivodeship: Greater Poland
- County: Wągrowiec
- Gmina: Skoki

Miączynek [mjɔnˈt͡ʂɨnɛk] is a settlement in the administrative district of Gmina Skoki, within Wągrowiec County, Greater Poland Voivodeship, in west-central Poland.
