= Młynki, Greater Poland Voivodeship =

Młynki
- Settlement
- Location within Poland
- Coordinates: 52°36′29″N 17°13′39″E
- Country: Poland
- Voivodeship: Greater Poland
- County: Wągrowiec
- Gmina: Skoki

Młynki [ˈmwɨnki] is a settlement in the administrative district of Gmina Skoki, within Wągrowiec County, Greater Poland Voivodeship, in west-central Poland.
