= Wołodrza =

- Village
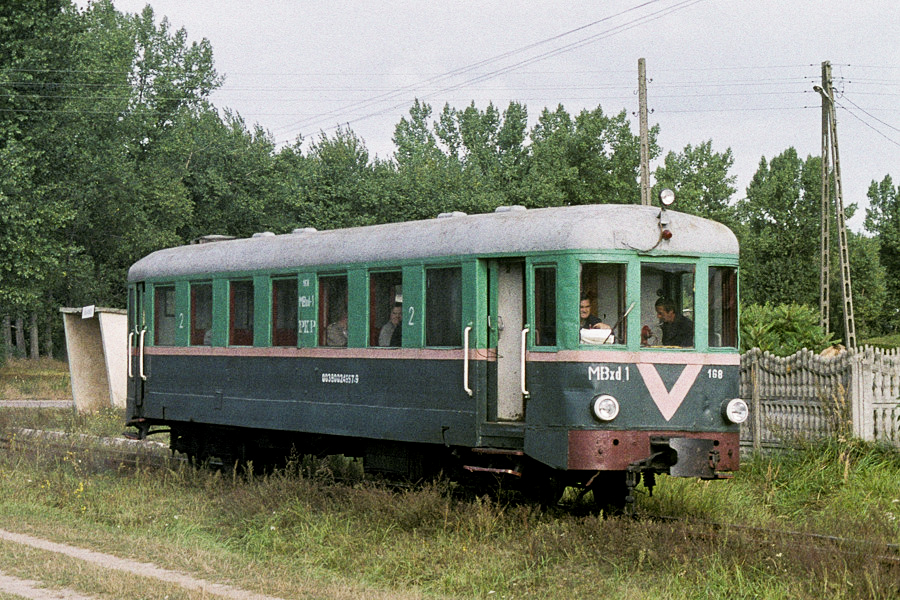

- Location within Poland
- Coordinates: 52°17′N 19°12′E
- Country: Poland
- Voivodeship: Łódź
- County: Kutno
- Gmina: Nowe Ostrowy
- Population (approx.): 150

Wołodrza [vɔˈwɔdʐa] is a village in the administrative district of Gmina Nowe Ostrowy, within Kutno County, Łódź Voivodeship, in central Poland.

The village has an approximate population of 150.
