= Roszkówko, Wągrowiec County =

Roszkówko
- Village
- Location within Poland
- Coordinates: 52°42′3″N 17°10′3″E
- Country: Poland
- Voivodeship: Greater Poland
- County: Wągrowiec
- Gmina: Skoki

Roszkówko [rɔʂˈkufkɔ] is a village in the administrative district of Gmina Skoki, within Wągrowiec County, Greater Poland Voivodeship, in west-central Poland.
