= Sława Wielkopolska =

- Village
- Location within Poland
- Coordinates: 52°38′16″N 17°8′45″E
- Country: Poland
- Voivodeship: Greater Poland
- County: Wągrowiec
- Gmina: Skoki
- Population: 109

Sława Wielkopolska [ˈswava vjɛlkɔˈpɔlska] is a village in the administrative district of Gmina Skoki, within Wągrowiec County, Greater Poland Voivodeship, in west-central Poland.
