= Jabłkowo =

- Village
- Location within Poland
- Coordinates: 52°40′N 17°18′E
- Country: Poland
- Voivodeship: Greater Poland
- County: Wągrowiec
- Gmina: Skoki
- Website: http://www.zspjablkowo.pl

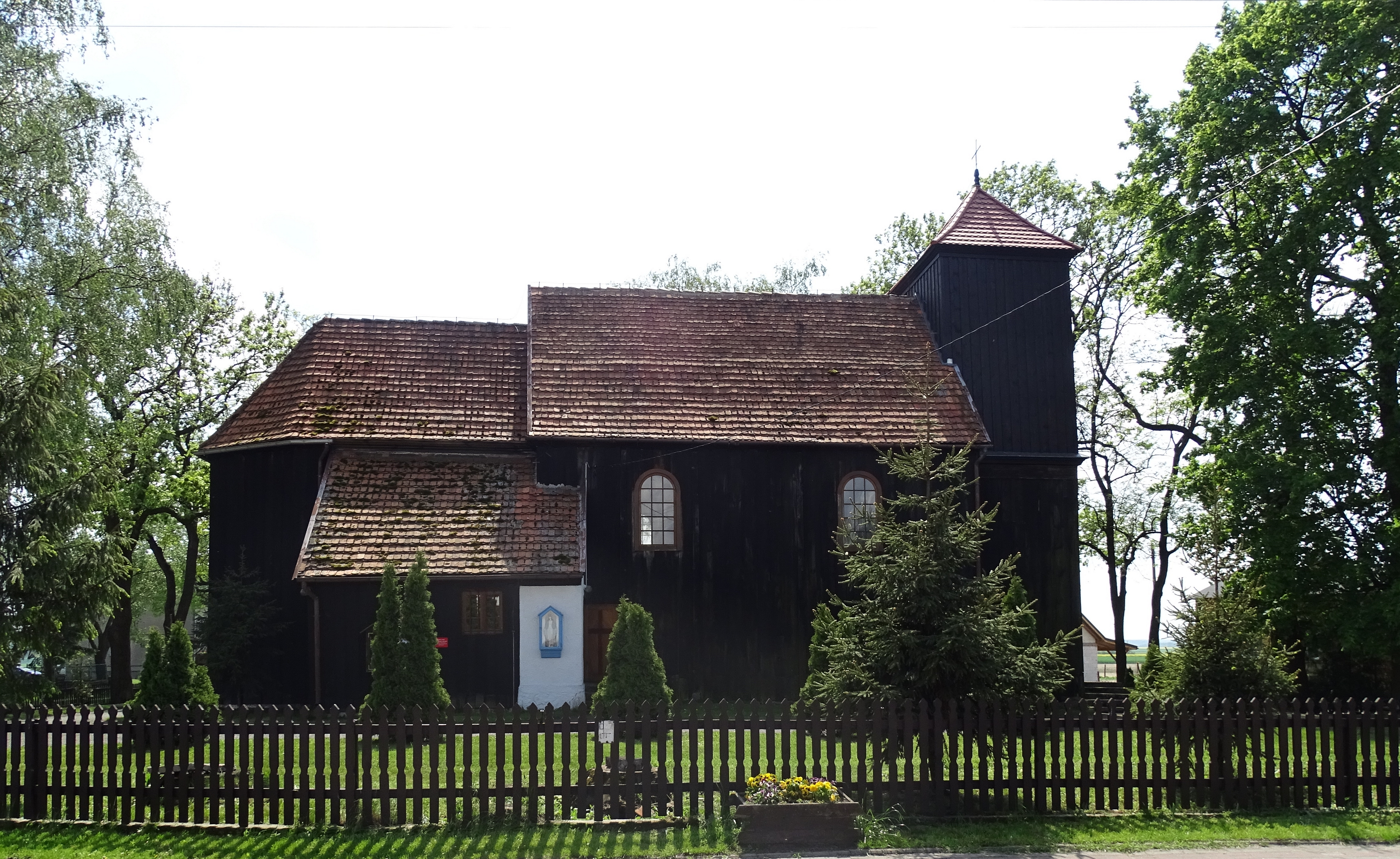
Church of St. Michael the Archangel from 1754.

Jabłkowo [jabu̯ˈkɔvɔ] is a village in the administrative district of Gmina Skoki, within Wągrowiec County, Greater Poland Voivodeship, in west-central Poland.

The village has a church which lies on the Wooden Churches Trail around Puszcza Zielonka.

On 1 V 1925 the Roman Catholic parish in Jabłkowo was restored.
