= Grodno, Łódź Voivodeship =

Grodno
- Village
- Location within Poland
- Coordinates: 52°17′40″N 19°12′47″E
- Country: Poland
- Voivodeship: Łódź
- County: Kutno
- Gmina: Nowe Ostrowy
- Population: 230

Grodno [ˈɡrɔdnɔ] is a village in the administrative district of Gmina Nowe Ostrowy, within Kutno County, Łódź Voivodeship, in central Poland.
