= Rdutów, Greater Poland Voivodeship =

Rdutów
- Village
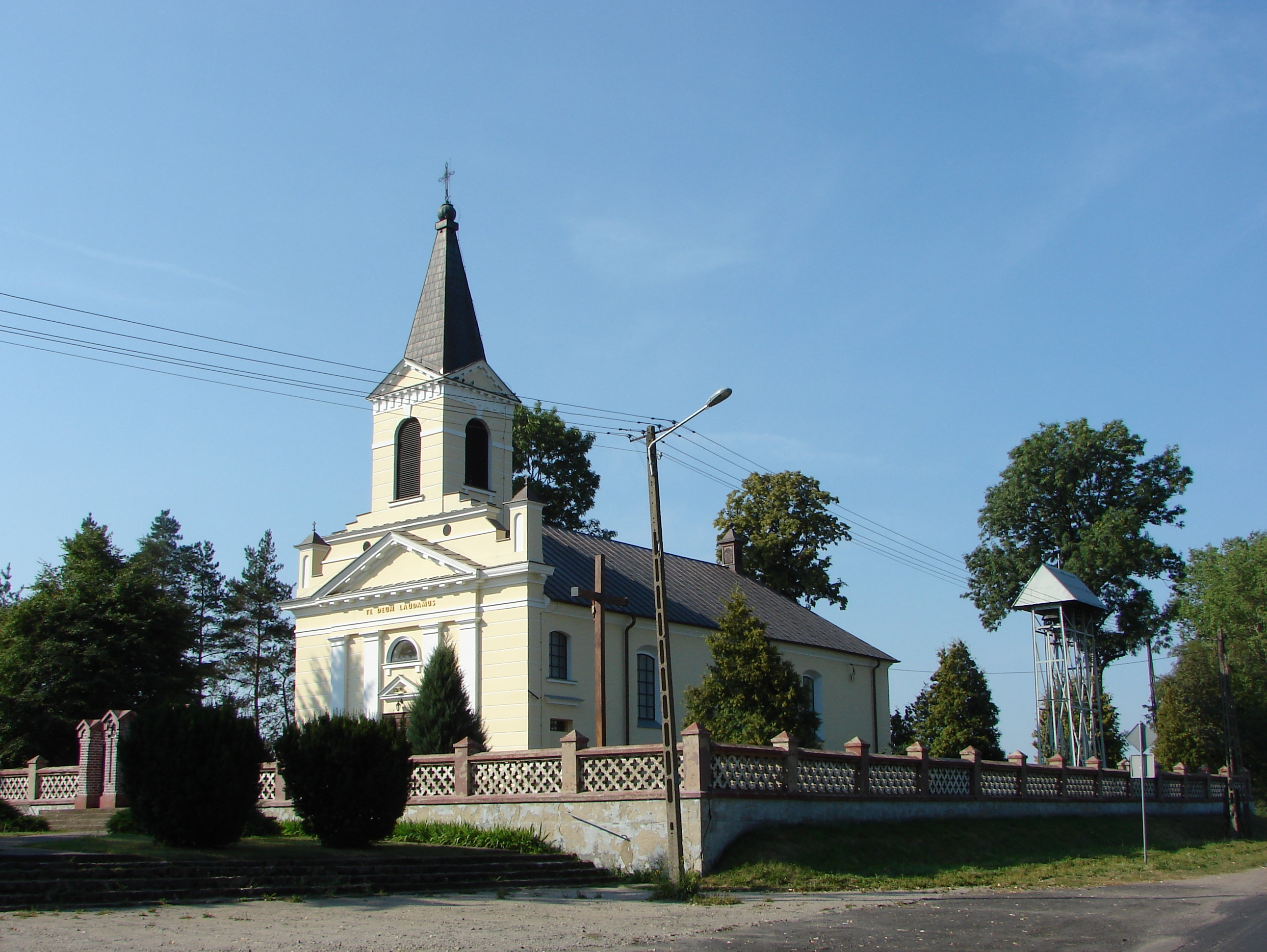
- Parish church of Saint John the Baptist. Built in 1800.

- Location within Poland
- Coordinates: 52°14′N 19°0′E
- Country: Poland
- Voivodeship: Greater Poland
- County: Koło
- Gmina: Chodów

Population
  - Total: 400
- Time zone: UTC+1 (CET)
  - Summer (DST): UTC+2 (CEST)
- Vehicle registration: PKL

Rdutów [ˈrdutuf] is a village in the administrative district of Gmina Chodów, in Koło County, Greater Poland Voivodeship, in central Poland.
