= Zieleniec, Greater Poland Voivodeship =

Zieleniec
- Village
- Location within Poland
- Coordinates: 52°15′55″N 18°58′30″E
- Country: Poland
- Voivodeship: Greater Poland
- County: Koło
- Gmina: Chodów
- Time zone: UTC+1 (CET)
  - Summer (DST): UTC+2 (CEST)
- Vehicle registration: PKL

Zieleniec [ʑɛˈlɛɲɛt͡s] is a village in the administrative district of Gmina Chodów, within Koło County, Greater Poland Voivodeship, in central Poland.
