= Ignacewo, Wągrowiec County =

Ignacewo
- Settlement
- Location within Poland
- Coordinates: 52°38′14″N 17°11′21″E
- Country: Poland
- Voivodeship: Greater Poland
- County: Wągrowiec
- Gmina: Skoki

Ignacewo [iɡnaˈt͡sɛvɔ] is a settlement in the administrative district of Gmina Skoki, within Wągrowiec County, Greater Poland Voivodeship, in west-central, Poland.
