= Rdutów, Łódź Voivodeship =

Rdutów
- Village
- Location within Poland
- Coordinates: 52°18′21″N 19°13′26″E
- Country: Poland
- Voivodeship: Łódź
- County: Kutno
- Gmina: Nowe Ostrowy
- Population: 70

Rdutów [ˈrdutuf] is a village in the administrative district of Gmina Nowe Ostrowy, within Kutno County, Łódź Voivodeship, in central Poland.
