= Grodno Drugie =

- Village
- Location within Poland
- Coordinates: 52°17′29″N 19°13′38″E
- Country: Poland
- Voivodeship: Łódź
- County: Kutno
- Gmina: Nowe Ostrowy
- Population: 80

Grodno Drugie [ˈɡrɔdnɔ ˈdruɡʲɛ] is a village in the administrative district of Gmina Nowe Ostrowy, within Kutno County, Łódź Voivodeship, in central Poland. The name literally translates as "Second Grodno".
