= Chociszewo, Greater Poland Voivodeship =

Chociszewo
- Village
- Location within Poland
- Coordinates: 52°42′00″N 17°13′13″E
- Country: Poland
- Voivodeship: Greater Poland
- County: Wągrowiec
- Gmina: Skoki

Chociszewo [xɔt͡ɕiˈʂɛvɔ] is a village in the administrative district of Gmina Skoki, within Wągrowiec County, Greater Poland Voivodeship, in west-central Poland.
