= Grochów, Łódź Voivodeship =

Grochów
- Village
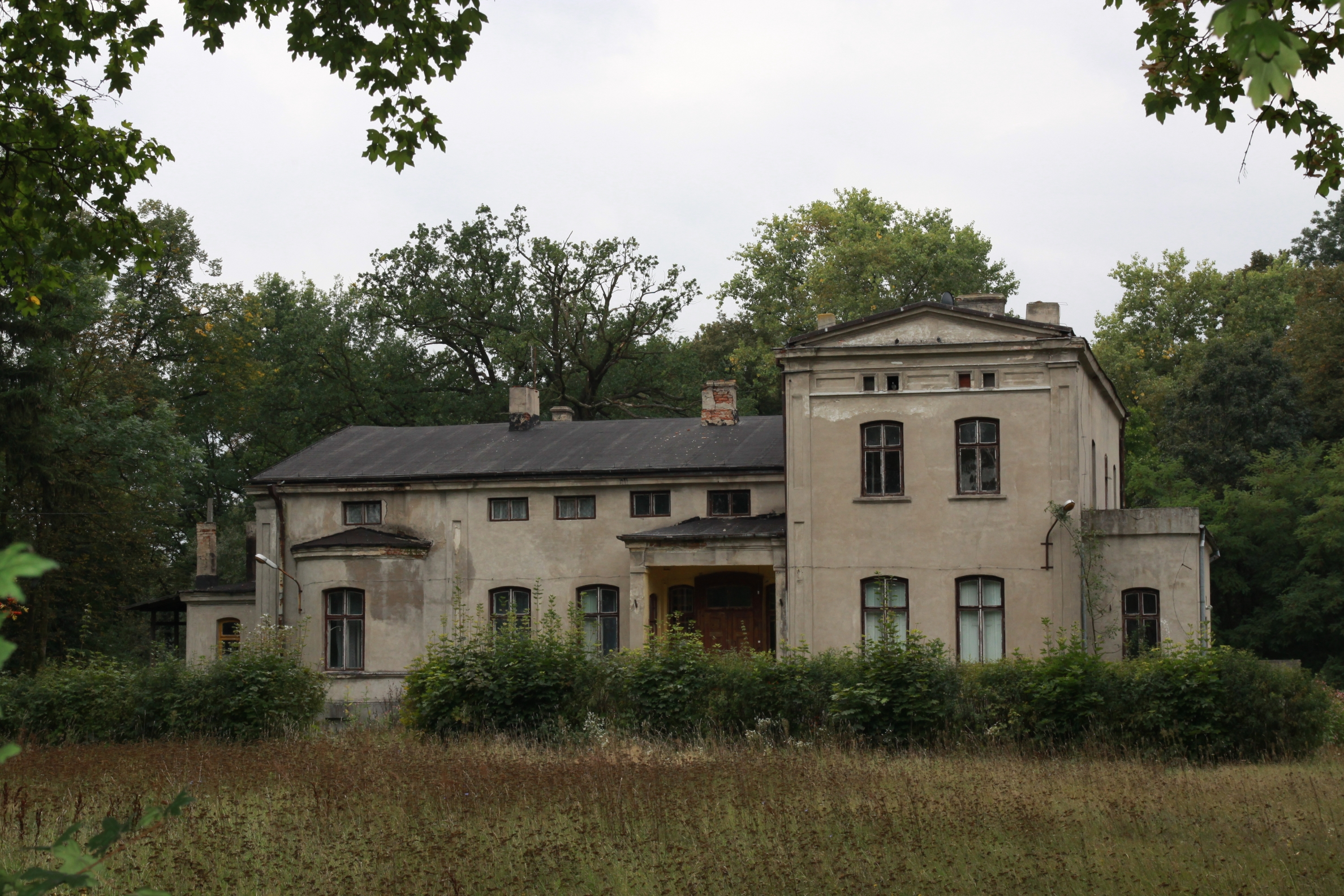
- Manor

- Location within Poland
- Coordinates: 52°16′43″N 19°15′26″E
- Country: Poland
- Voivodeship: Łódź
- County: Kutno
- Gmina: Nowe Ostrowy

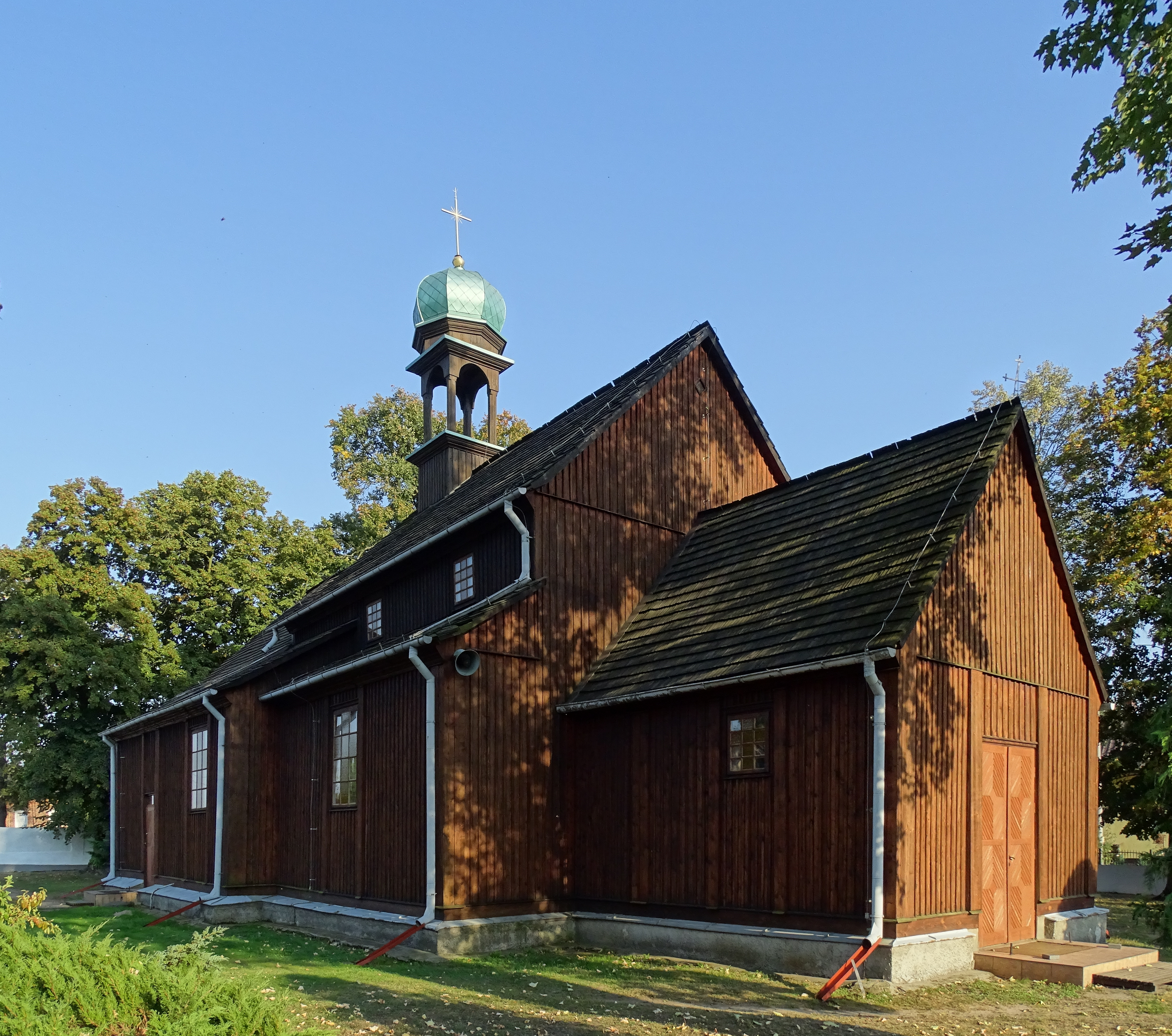
Church of Saint Thomas from 1681

Grochów [ˈɡrɔxuf] is a village in the administrative district of Gmina Nowe Ostrowy, within Kutno County, Łódź Voivodeship, in central Poland.
