= Imielno, Łódź Voivodeship =

Imielno
- Village
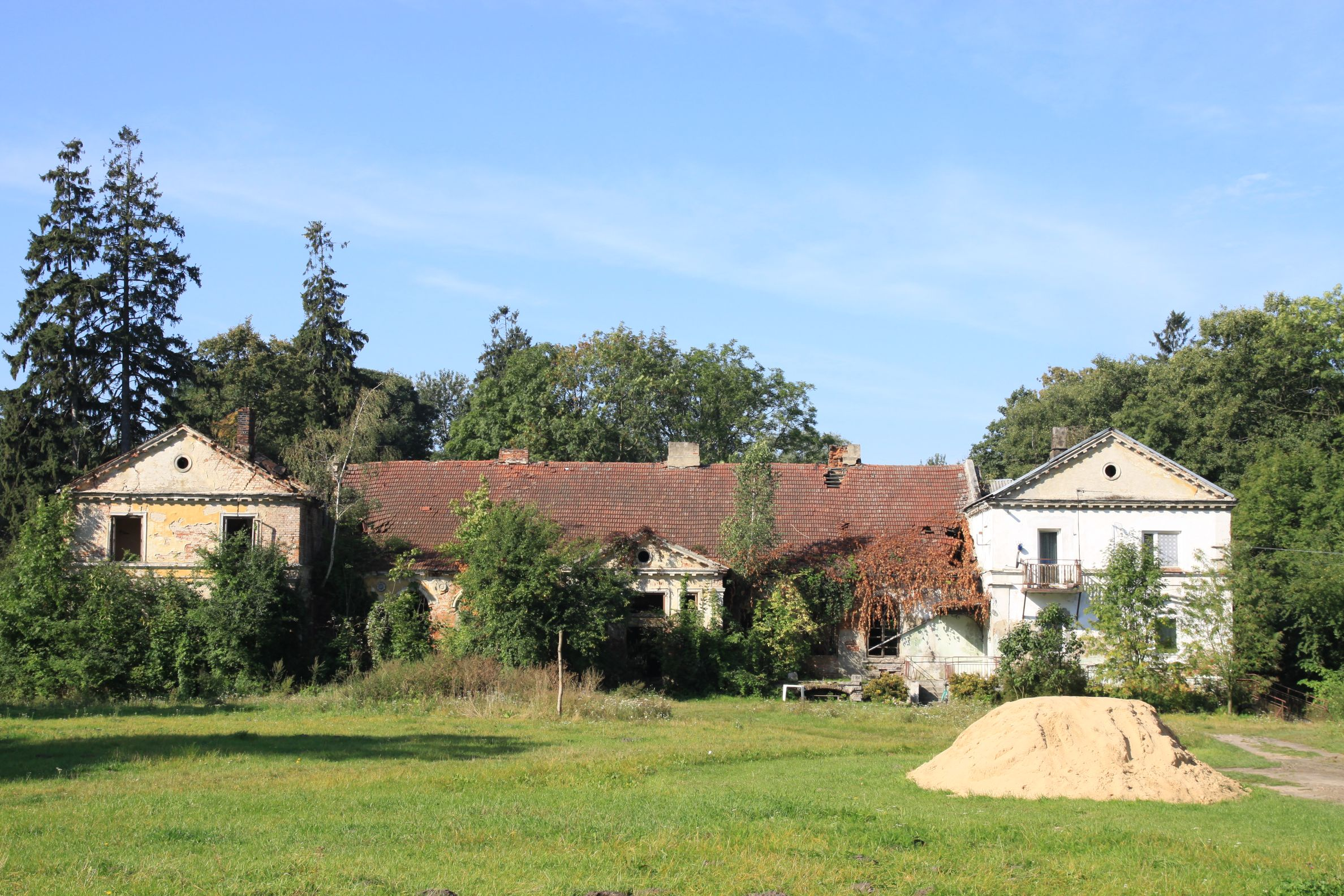
- Manor

- Location within Poland
- Coordinates: 52°19′29″N 19°13′23″E
- Country: Poland
- Voivodeship: Łódź
- County: Kutno
- Gmina: Nowe Ostrowy

Imielno [iˈmjɛlnɔ] is a village in the administrative district of Gmina Nowe Ostrowy, within Kutno County, Łódź Voivodeship, in central Poland.
