= Zieleniec, Łódź Voivodeship =

Zieleniec
- Village
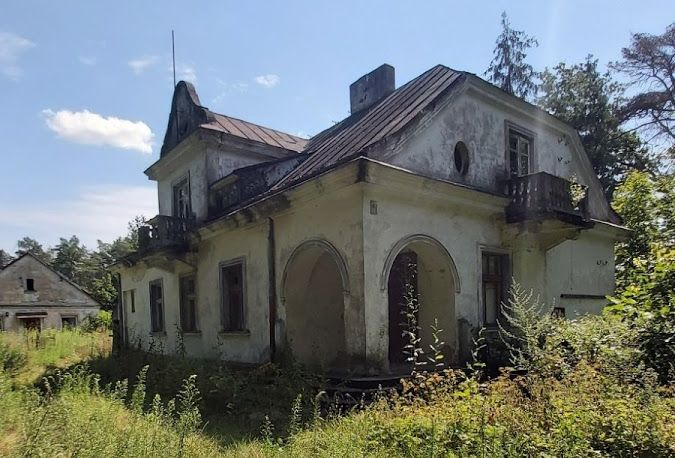

- Location within Poland
- Coordinates: 52°19′21″N 19°11′39″E
- Country: Poland
- Voivodeship: Łódź
- County: Kutno
- Gmina: Nowe Ostrowy

Zieleniec [ʑɛˈlɛɲɛt͡s] is a village in the administrative district of Gmina Nowe Ostrowy, within Kutno County, Łódź Voivodeship, in central Poland.
