= Battle of Grodno =

Battle of Grodno may refer to:

- Battle of Grodno (1706), during the Great Northern War
- Battle of Grodno (1708), also during the Great Northern War
- Battle of Grodno (1812), during the French invasion of Russia
- First Battle of Grodno (1920), a Polish tank counter-attack during the Polish-Soviet War
- Battle of the Niemen River of 1920, sometimes referred to as the Second Battle of Grodno
- Battle of Grodno (1939), during the Soviet invasion of Poland, World War II

== See also ==
- Campaign of Grodno
