= Przyborowo =

Przyborowo may refer to the following places:

- Przyborowo, Gniezno County in Greater Poland Voivodeship (west-central Poland)
- Przyborowo, Gostyń County in Greater Poland Voivodeship (west-central Poland)
- Przyborowo, Podlaskie Voivodeship (north-east Poland)
- Przyborowo, Szamotuły County in Greater Poland Voivodeship (west-central Poland)
