= Myślęcin =

Myślęcin may refer to the following places:

- Myślęcin, Greater Poland Voivodeship (west-central Poland)
- Myślęcin, Warmian-Masurian Voivodeship (north Poland)
- Myślęcin, West Pomeranian Voivodeship (north-west Poland)
