= New Market Square, Bydgoszcz =

Place, Bydgoszcz, Poland, 19th century

Coordinates: 53°7′12″N 17°59′51″E

New Market Square
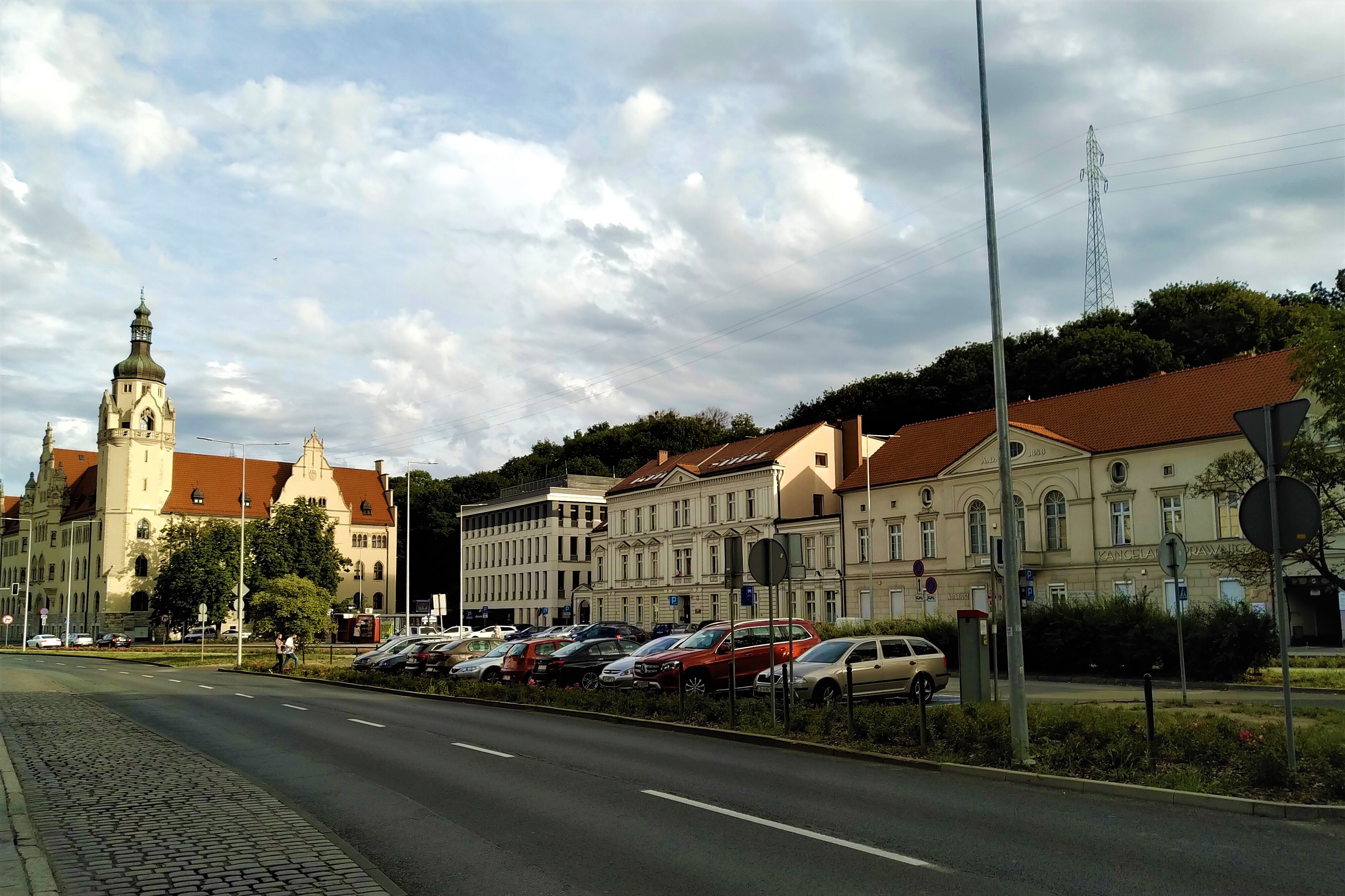
- View of the eastern side

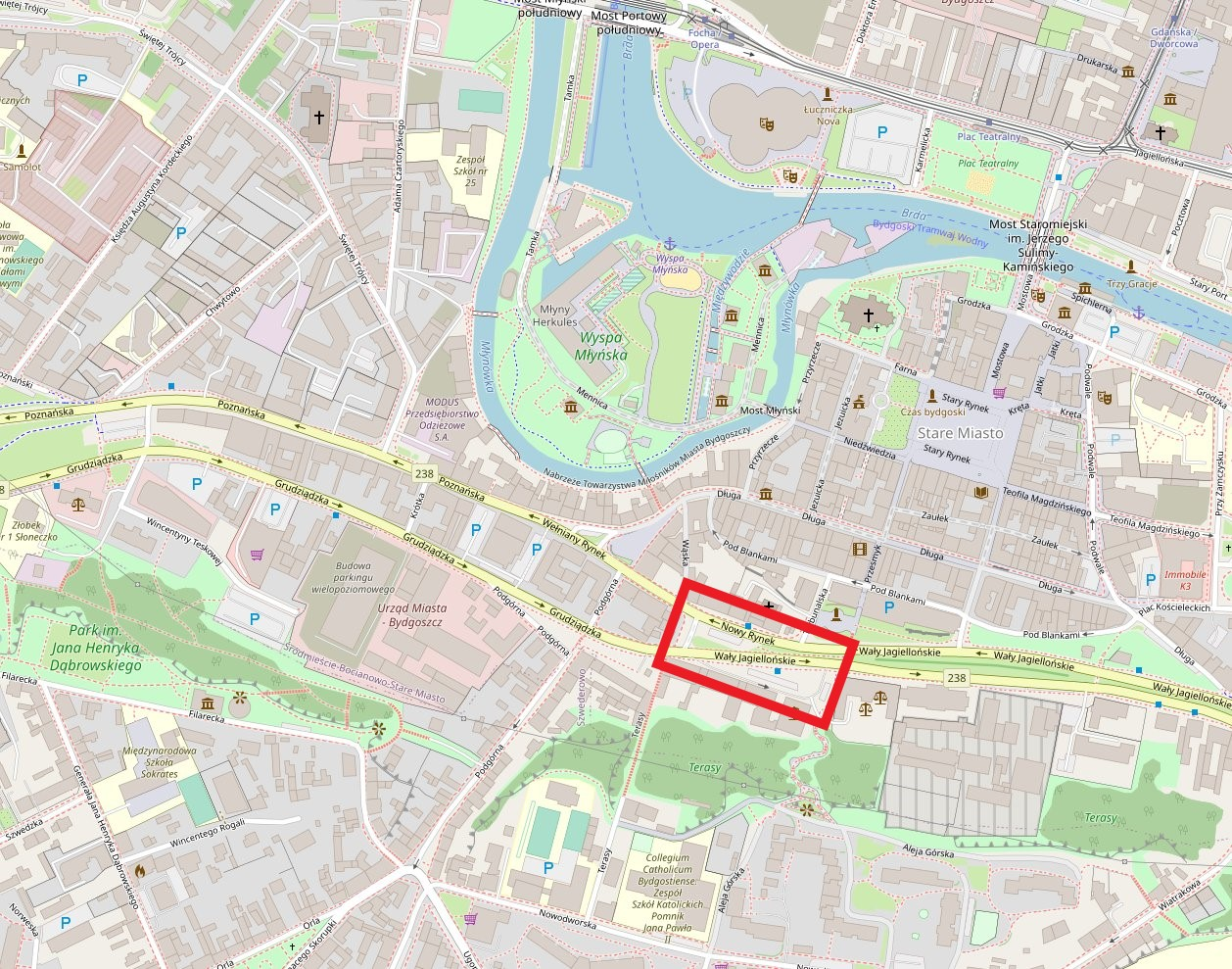
- Nowy Rynek on a map of Bydgoszcz
- Native name: Nowy Rynek (Polish)
- Former names: Neuer Markt, Franz-Xaver-Schwarz-Platz, Plac Pawła Findera
- Type: Square
- Owner: City of Bydgoszcz
- Location: Bydgoszcz, Poland

Construction
- Inauguration: 1835

New Market Square (Polish: Nowy Rynek) is a city square located in downtown Bydgoszcz, Poland. Dating from the early 19th century, it has been remodelled since its creation.

== Location ==
The New Market Square is positioned 200 meters (660 ft) south of the Old Market Square, at the foot of the Aleja Górska park. Shaped as a rectangle of 120 meters (390 ft) by 50 meters (160 ft), it is at the junction of Wały Jagiellońskie Street in the east and Grudziądzka Street in the west, and runs parallel to Długa Street.

== History ==
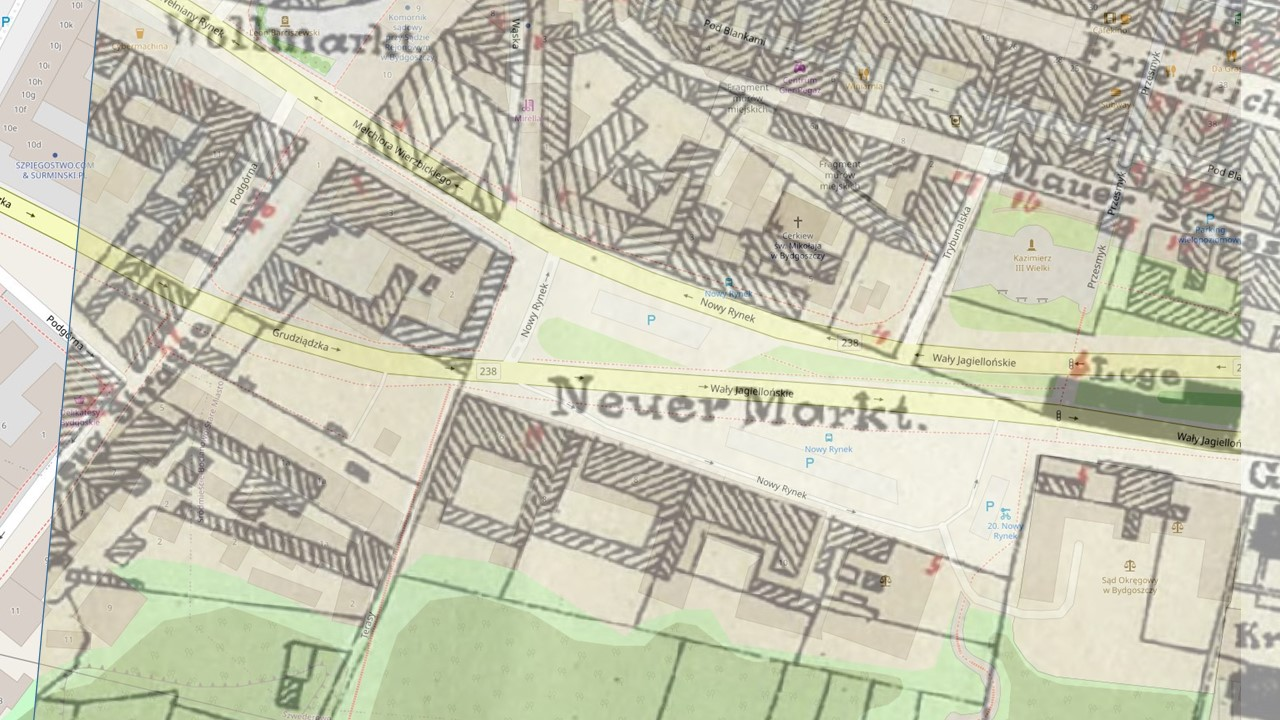
1876 map showing in overlay the current square

Following the Congress of Vienna, Bydgoszcz (then called Bromberg) was reintegrated into the Prussian Empire, as the seat of the Bromberg region of the Grand Duchy of Posen. Prussian city authorities laid out zones for the urban development of Bydgoszcz. With the construction of the seat of the region at 3 Jagiellońska Street, multiple buildings were constructed south of the Old Market Square, including the New Market Square in 1835, the district court, and a prison. The New Market Square originally hosted fairs and shooting ranges, before being used for Prussian army parades.

In 1902, the first shop was opened in the New Market Square, run by the company Siuchniński i Stobiecki, they sold silk fabric (Polish: bławat) and women's and men's clothing. In 1911, they moved to a new store at Stary Rynek 20.

During the interwar period, it was the location of scouting activities, under the patronage of Józef Haller.

Grudziądzka Street was widened between 1975 and 1976, which altered the rectangular shape of the square.

On the north-eastern side of the square were the buildings of the Masonic lodge "Janus in the East" (Polish: Janus na Wschodzie), where the statue of Casimir III the Great is now. Of the two buildings, erected on the eve of the 19th century, one burned down in 1945 and the other was demolished during the widening of Grudziądzka Street.

Until September 14, 2020, the building at Nr. 1 has housed a branch of the Provincial and Municipal Public Library.

=== Naming ===
Through history, the square bore the following names:

- 1835–1920 – Neuer Markt;
- 1920–1939 – Nowy Rynek;
- 1939–1940 – Neuer Markt;
- 1940–1945 – Franz Xaver Schwarz Platz;
- 1945–1949 – Nowy Rynek;
- 1950–1956 – Plac Paweł Finder:
- Since 1956 – Nowy Rynek.

== Main buildings ==
Tenement at 1
Mid-19th century
Neo-classicism

Municipal archives trace back the ownership of the plot to the early 19th century. In 1809, it was owned by a shoemaker, Carl Gottlieb Müller.

An address book from 1855 identifies Franz Augustus Dieß, a merchant, as its first landlord, who was the owner of the house for fifty years. In 1906, the municipality took ownership of the building. After World War 1, it housed the lower court office of the Bydgoszcz authorities.

The façade, renovated in 2019, displays classical features. The first level contains a wrought iron balcony, flanked by lesenes and an adorned lintel. On the same floor, the wings of the building contain a round-top window with a figure. The second-level pediment is crowned by a series of stuccoed festoons.

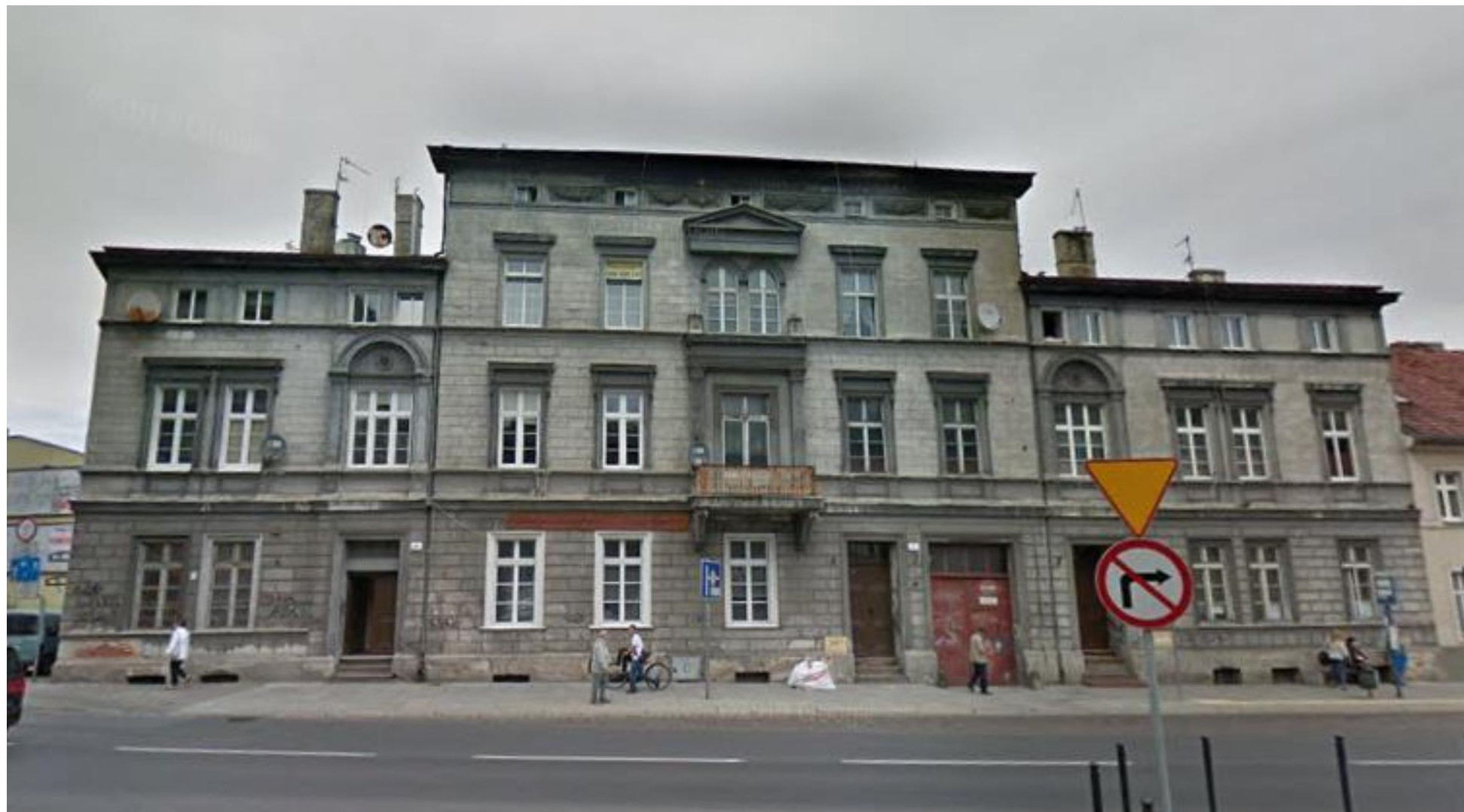
Façade on the square

Tenement at 2
1875-1900
Eclecticism

Originally registered as 11/12 Neuer Markt, the first landlord was a law doctor and lawyer, Napoleon Hailliant, who previously lived on the Wool Market Square.

The building is being renovated in 2021. Both façades have architectural details, including:

- bossage, carved wooden door and figure heads crowning the windows of the ground floor;
- round pediments adorned with stuccoed flowers and putti, lesenes and rosettes on the first floor;
- mascarons, garnished capitals on the second level;
- round top windows with tracery on the top floor;
- two large stone balconies and a corner bow window.
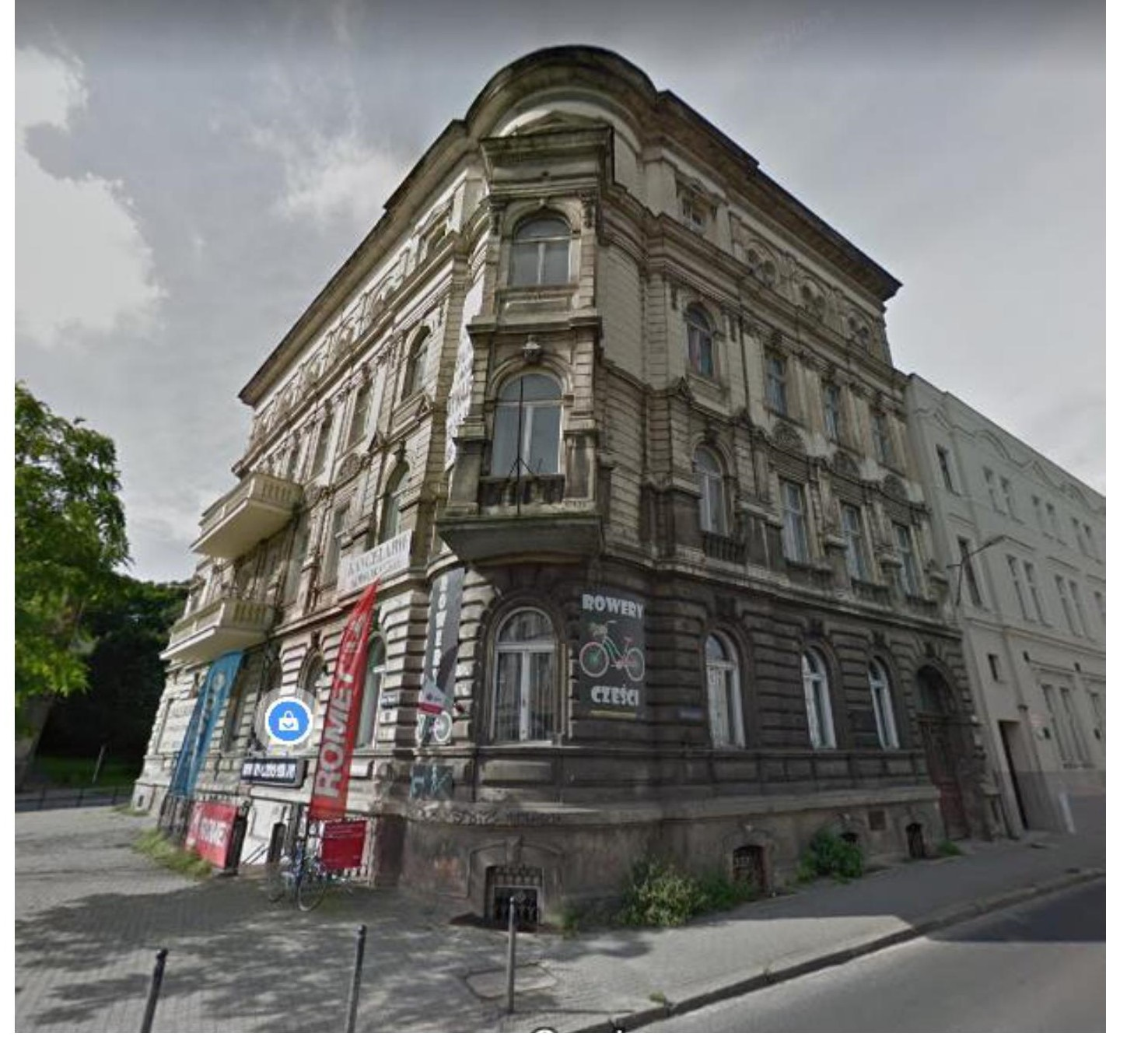
Corner view

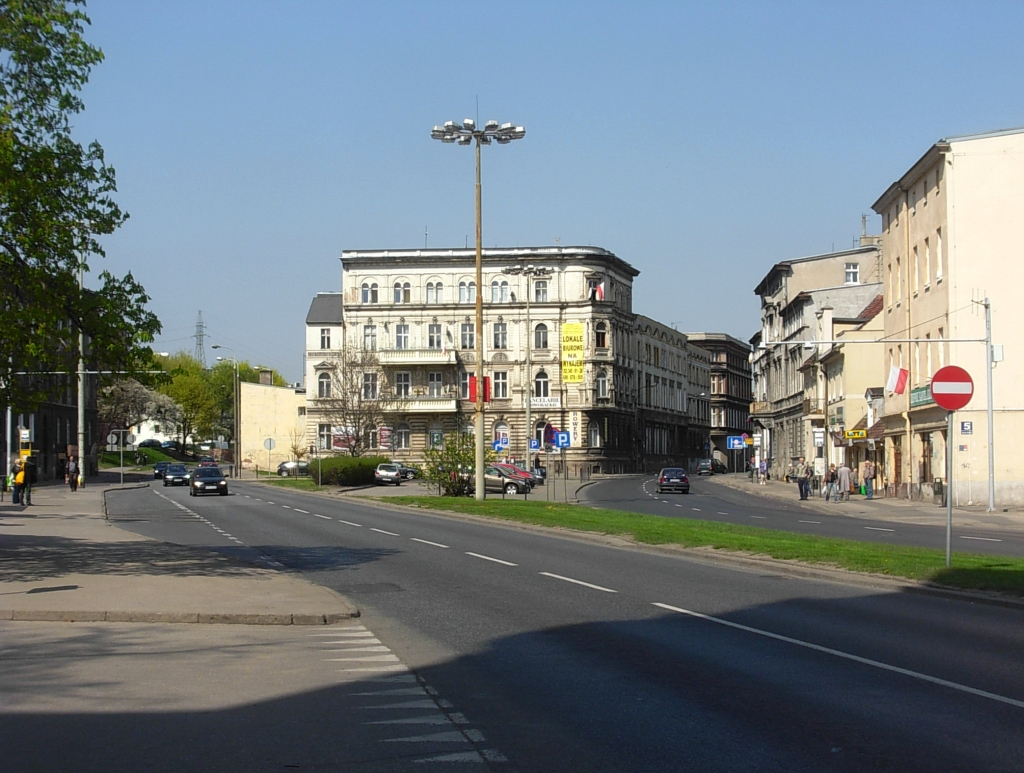
View of the tenement from the eastern side of the square

Tenement at 3
1850s
Early modernism

Christian Stellbaum, an innkeeper living in nearby Groß Bergstraße (today's Wały Jagiellońskie street) owned this building in the mid-19th century. At the beginning of the 20th century, the landlord was a merchant, Theofil Sypniewski. The building, then at 2 Neuer Markt, housed his clothes and fashion shop. In the 1910s, he moved it to 1/2 Neue ßfarrstraße (present-day Jezuicka Street), where it was co-managed with his relative Richard. At the same time, the house was sold to a master carpenter, Teodor Kosicki.

The frontage, renovated in 2019, is in an early modernist style, that stems from its rebuilding in the 1910s. A picture from the 1900s shows the asymmetrical appearance of the building, lacking the extension of the left-wing, which was added later. To this day, its façade balcony overlooking the square has been preserved.

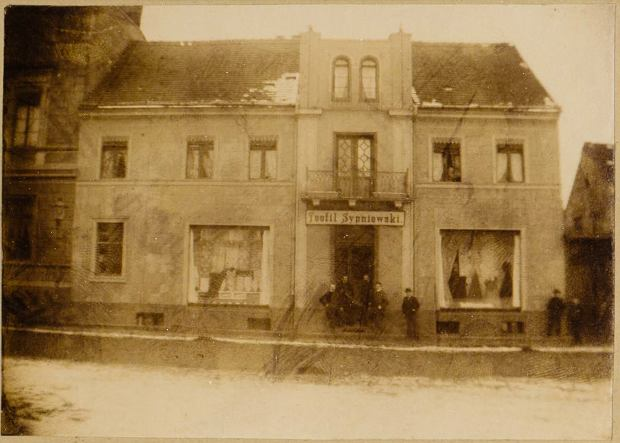
The house in the 1900s harbouring Teofil Sypniewski shop

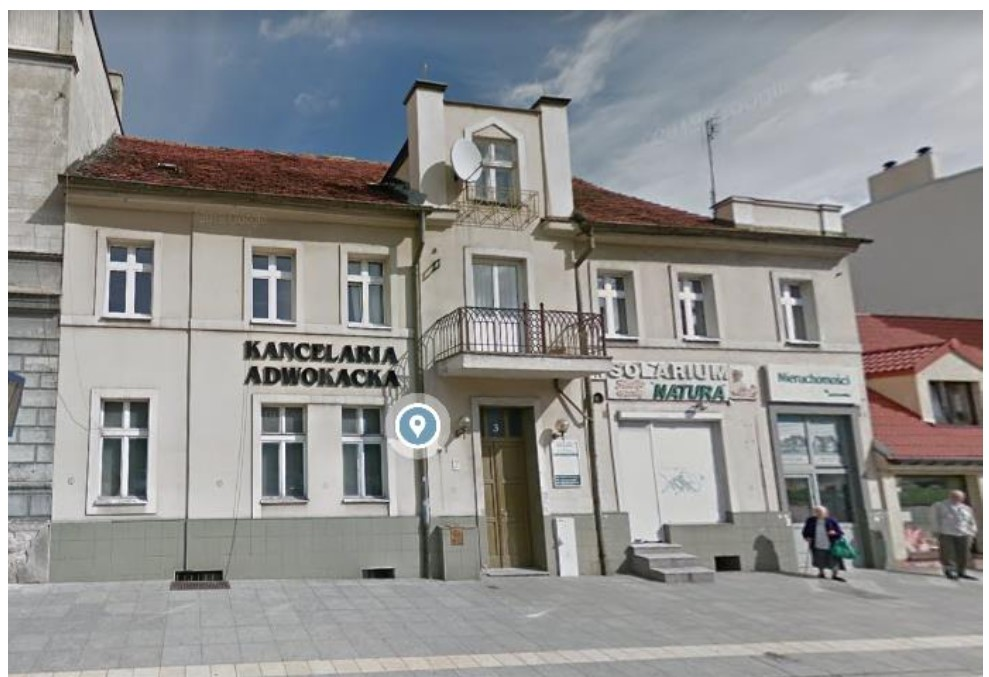
Current view from the square

St. Nicolas Church Orthodox church at 5
Registered on Kuyavian-Pomeranian Voivodeship Heritage List (Nr.601383 Reg.A/285), 28 December 2004
1870

This building belongs to the Polish Autocephalous Orthodox Church's Kuyavian-Pomeranian deanery, of the Łódź-Poznań diocese, settling in the building in 1980–1981, previously being located in a small annex of the Polish-Catholic Church, at 36 Śniadecki Street. The building, with an entrance from Trybunalska Street, was built in 1870 and was originally used to store a groat. In 1925, it housed a chaff cutter and a shot-blasting plant, and after 1945 a warehouse.

The edifice was initially a 19th-century wattle and daub granary, supported by low brick buttresses. During renovations, the interior was changed into a single-story building, and wooden ceilings were installed, with a lower ceiling added to the east porch. The main body is covered with a high gable roof with an onion-shaped ridge turret. Inside, there is an original 18th-century icon made of black oak, and a collection of 18th and 19th-century icons from eastern workshops. In 1992, the church dome was topped with an Orthodox cross. In 2013, the interior of the church was renovated, conserving icons, banners, and the processional cross, and in 2020, the edifice underwent maintenance of the ceiling and cellars.

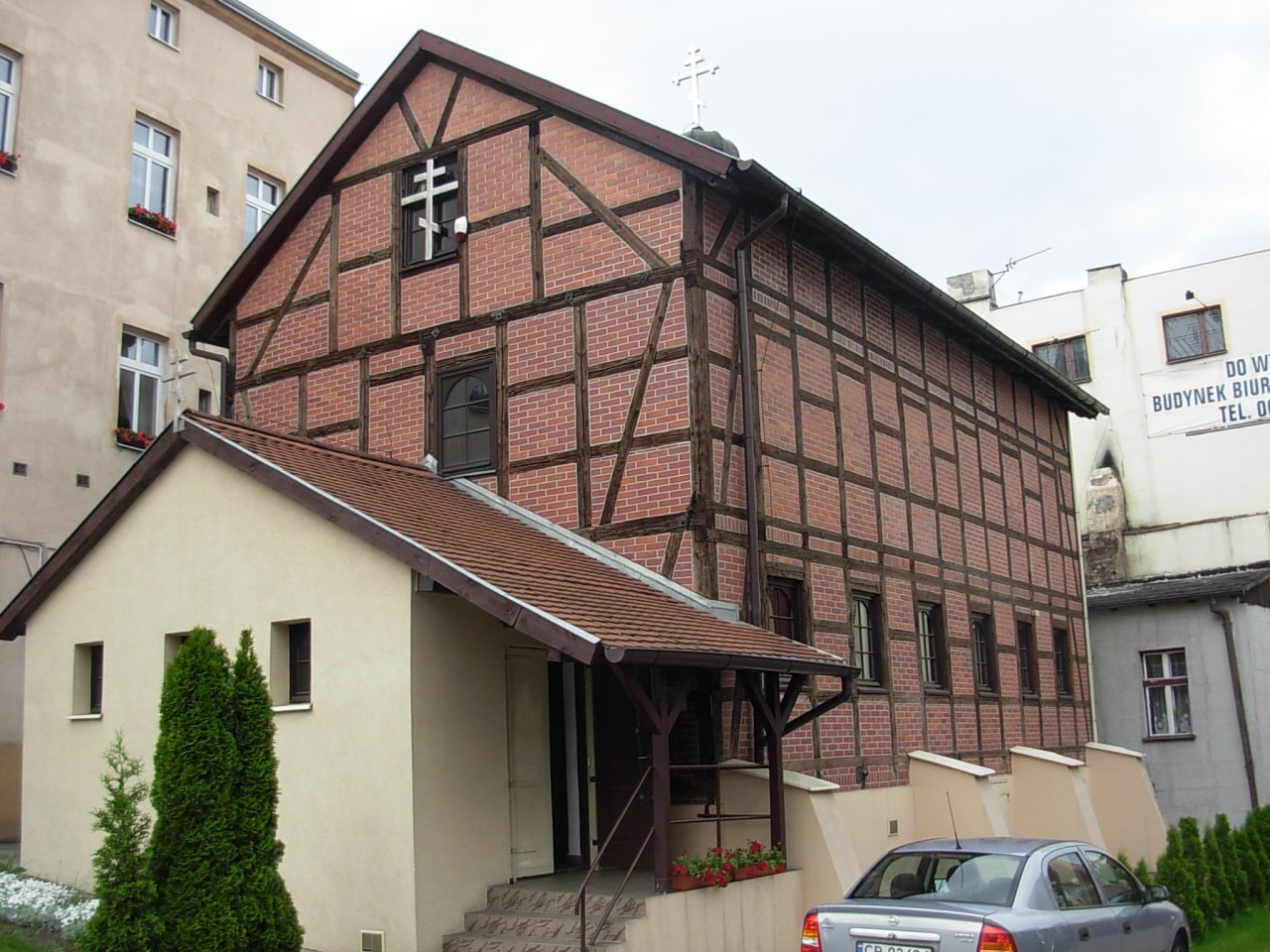
View from Trybunalska street

Tenement at 5
1850-1875
Eclecticism

The first registered owner at then 3 Neuer Markt was a rentier, Mrs. Gerlich, in the late 1860s. A few years later, a restaurateur named Felix Dylewski moved in, and lived in the property until the 1880s. In 1890, the owner was a baker, Emil Teßlass, who had lived on the square at what was then Nr.10, now Nr.6.

Soon a restaurateur, Theofil Sypniewski, took over ownership of the edifice. Sypniewski had the building redesigned by local architect Józef Święcicki. He was also a shopkeeper, as he opened a clothes store at today's Nr.3 in the early 1900s. When the shop moved away in the 1910s, he kept the property of the tenement but did not live there. At the beginning of the 20th century, the building also housed a wine shop called Zięłak & Milchert.

In 2014, a commemorative plaque in memorial of Jan Cieluch (Świeca-1899, Bydgoszcz-1983), a lawyer who practiced in Bydgoszcz, was unveiled on the wall of the tenement. During the interwar period, he was involved in political activity as a member of the "Piast" Party. After being arrested in April 1940 by the Gestapo, Cieluch was imprisoned in the Sachsenhausen concentration camp and later at Mauthausen. During his imprisonment, he was active in the camp resistance movement and was freed in May 1945. After the war, he resumed his intense professional life as a member of the Provincial Bar Association, dean of the Bydgoszcz Chamber, and councilor of the Municipal Council in Bydgoszcz.

Renovated in 2013, the building has kept very few of its initial features. In particular, none of the two original balconies are present today.

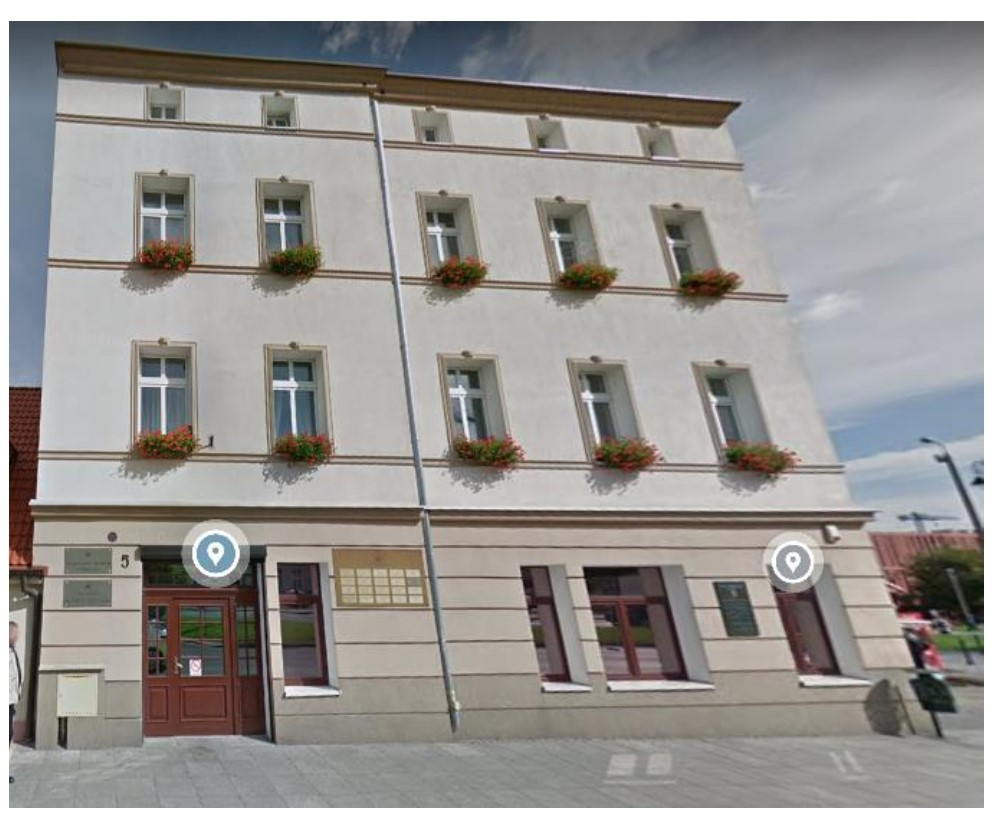
Current view from the street

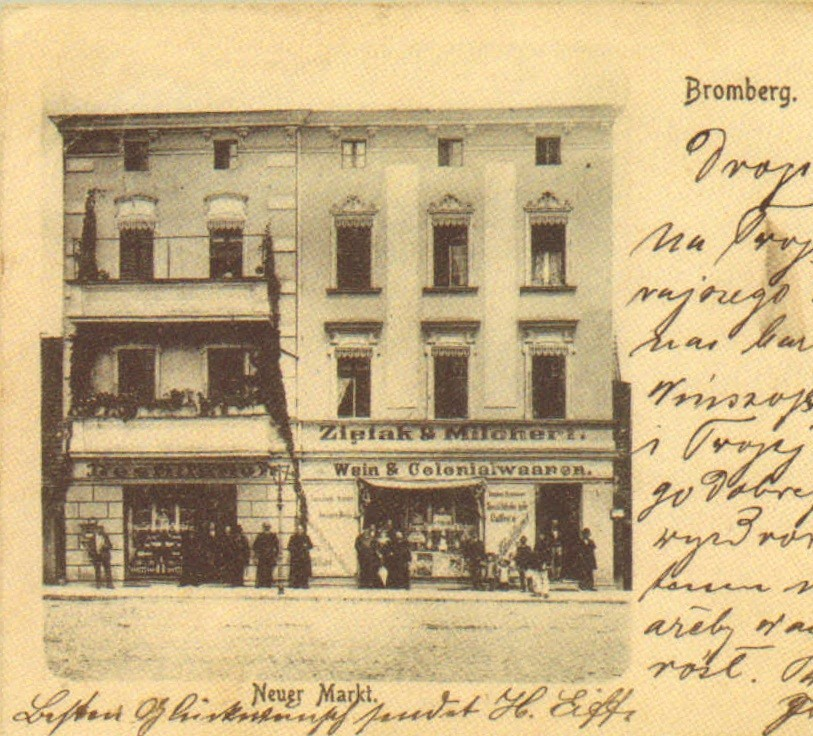
Postcard from 1902

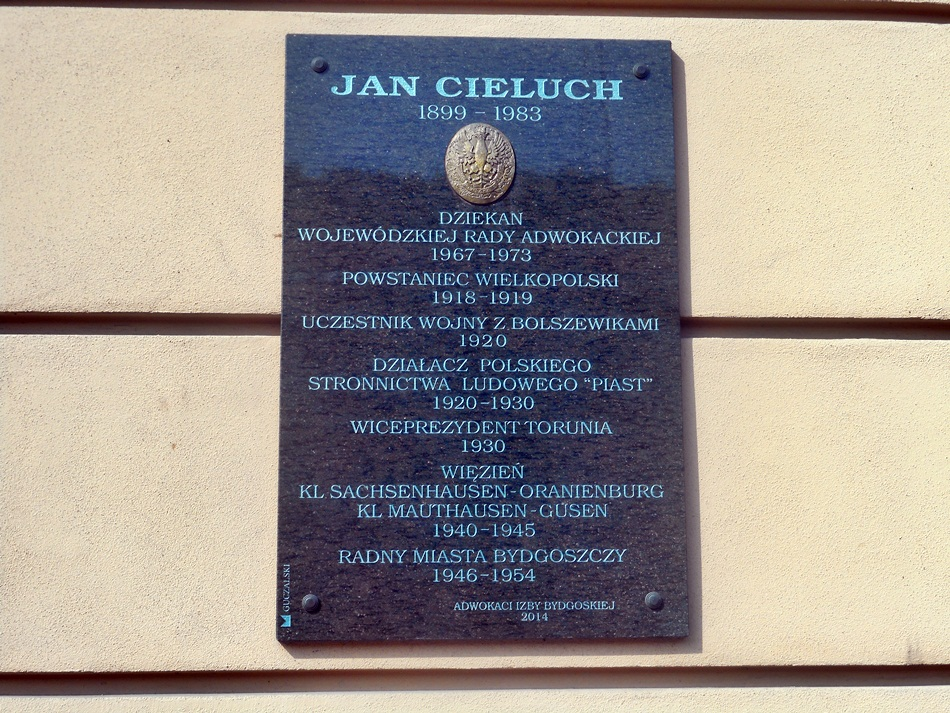
J. Cieluch commemorative plaque at Nr.5

Tenement at 6
1850s
Eclecticism

C. F. Beleites, a merchant, is listed as the first landlord of the tenement in 1855. In 1890, the new owner, a baker named Emil Teßlass, lived in the building. He was also the landholder of the house at 3 Neuer Markt (today's Nr.5).

The frontage, now in need of refurbishing, still features a tall entrance door with a fanlight, and embellished openings flanked with column pairs on upper floors. The second and third level windows over the entrance display tracery in the shape of a column. The ensemble was restored in 2025.

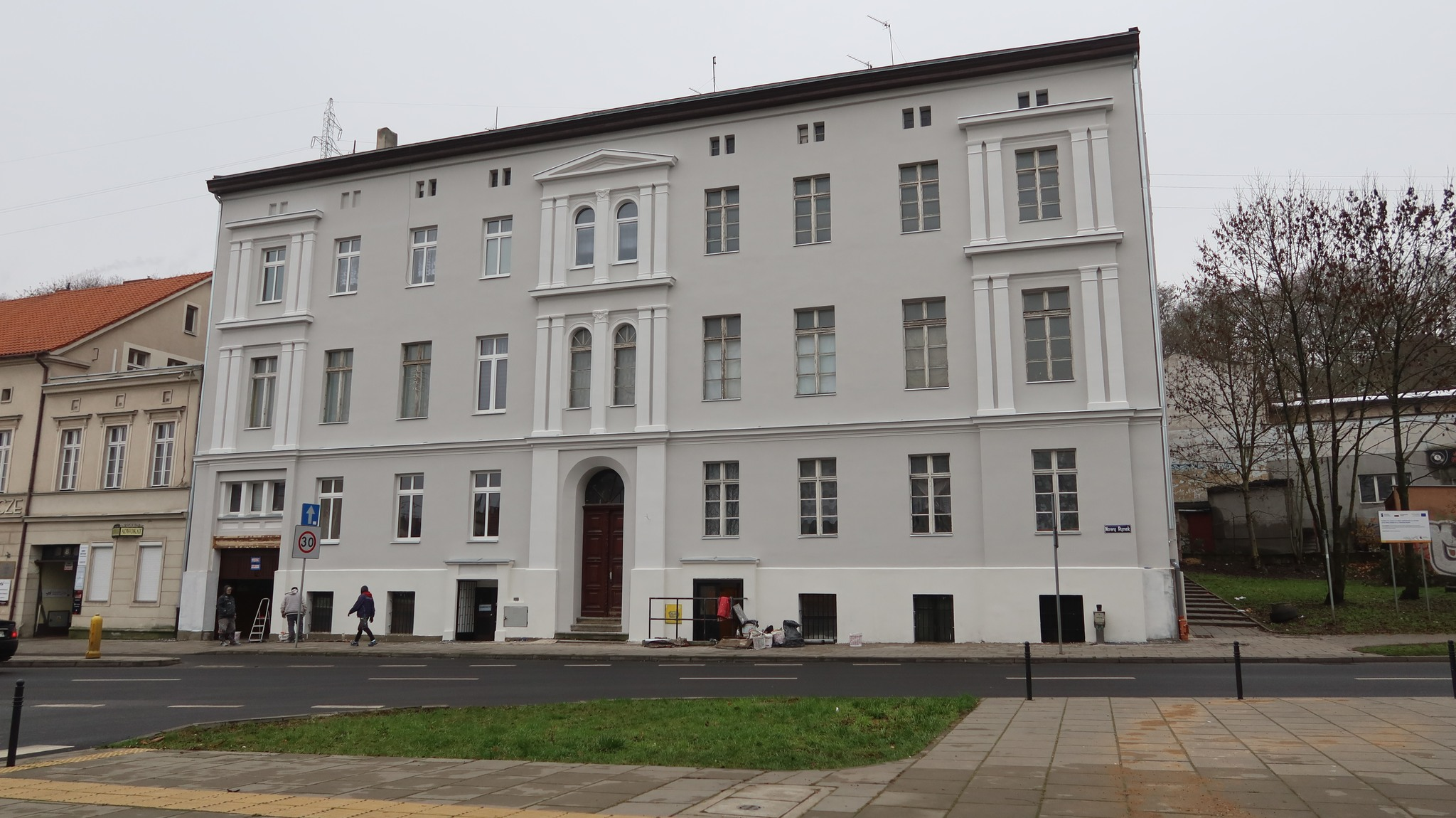
Elevation on the square

Tenement at 8
1848
Neoclassical architecture

From 1849 to 1853, this building housed the Royal Eastern Railway Directorate. In 1880, it was subordinate to other branches located in Berlin, Poznań, Gdańsk and Królewiec. Around 1890, the Directorate moved to a building on Dworcowa Street.

After WWI, Antoni Piliński (1883-1938) lived there. At the time, he was one of the largest mustard, oil, and vinegar producers in Poland, owning brands including Fermenta, Ola, and Polsce. His factory was located on the other side of the New Market Square, at 10 Trybunalska street, and operated until the start of WWII. Nowadays, the building houses law and notary offices, businesses related to the court, and the district prosecutor's office.

The edifice is a double-winged, two-story house built in an Empire style. The front elevation has rich ornamentation, especially the portal framed with rosettes and the round-top windows crowned by a large triangular pediment. The lobby is adorned with stuccoed decoration and contains a staircase with a wooden balustrade.

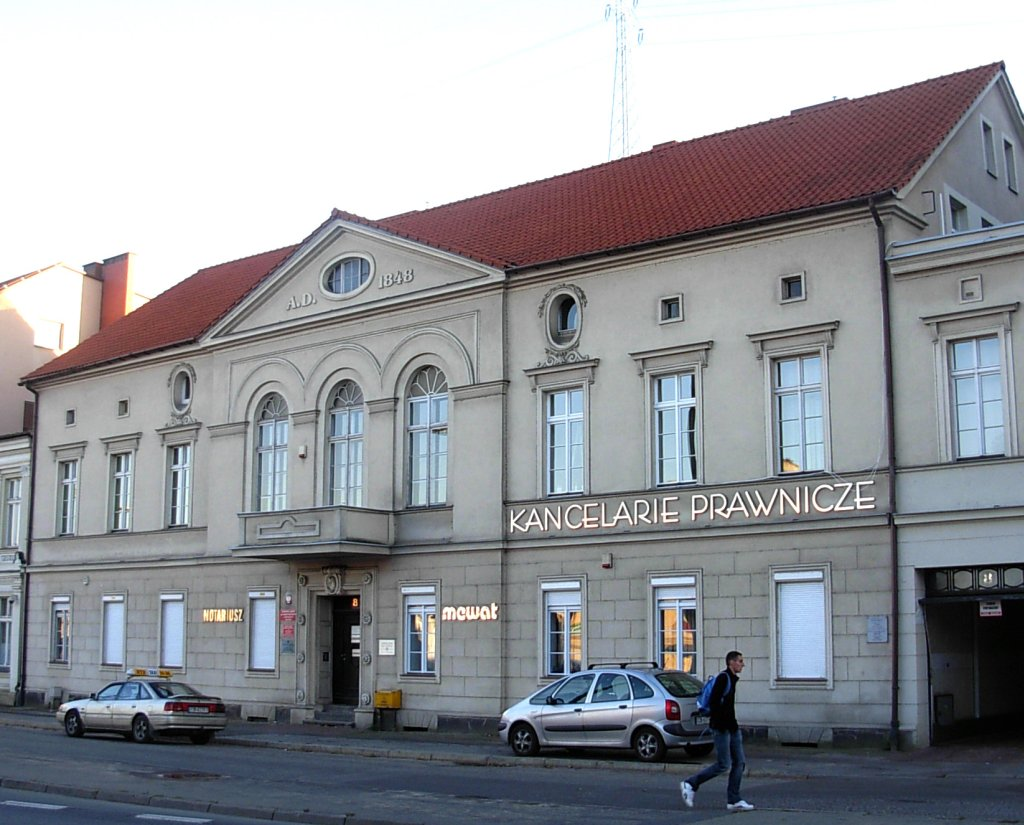
Main frontage

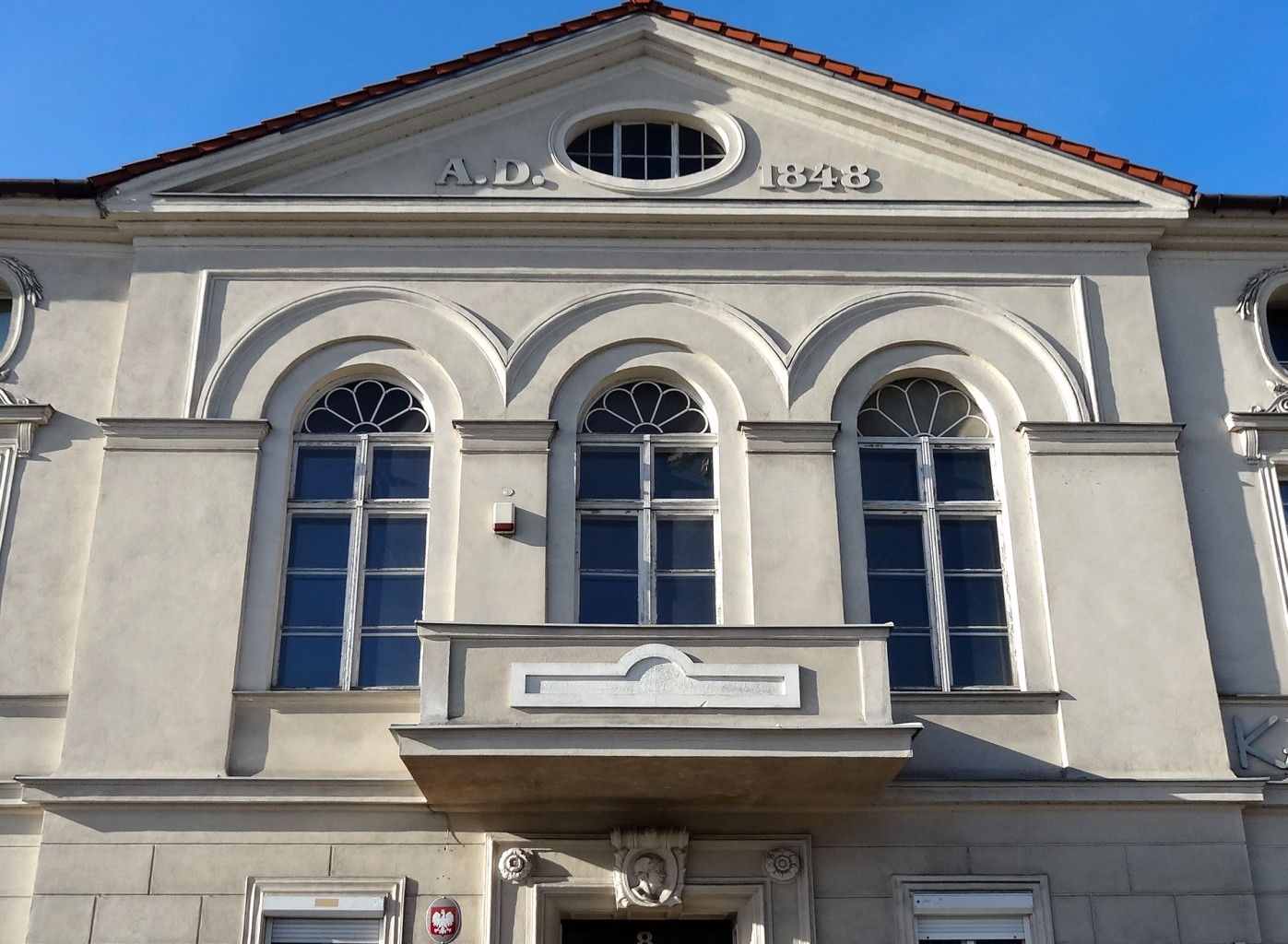
Avant-corps and gable

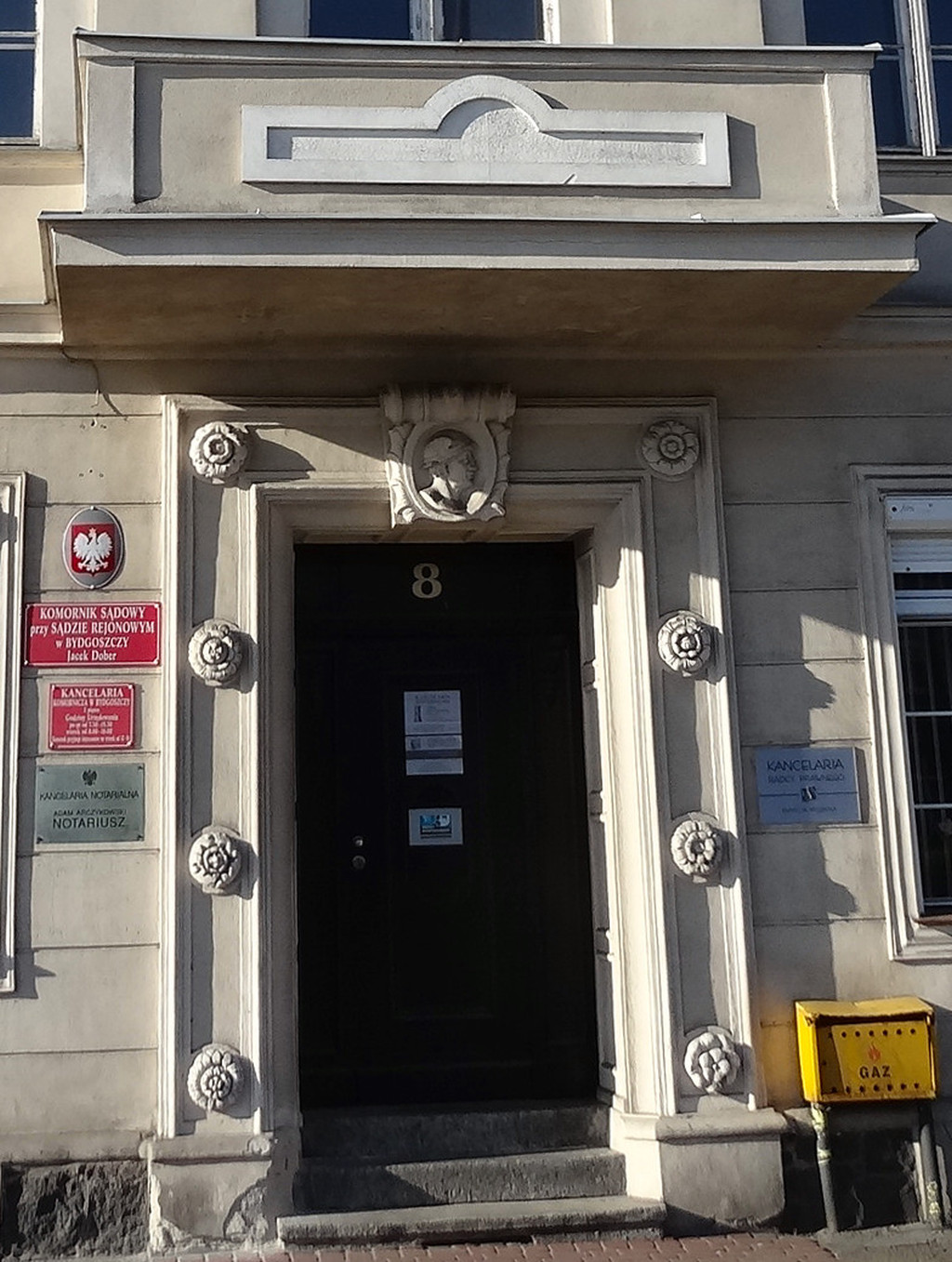
Outside entrance portal

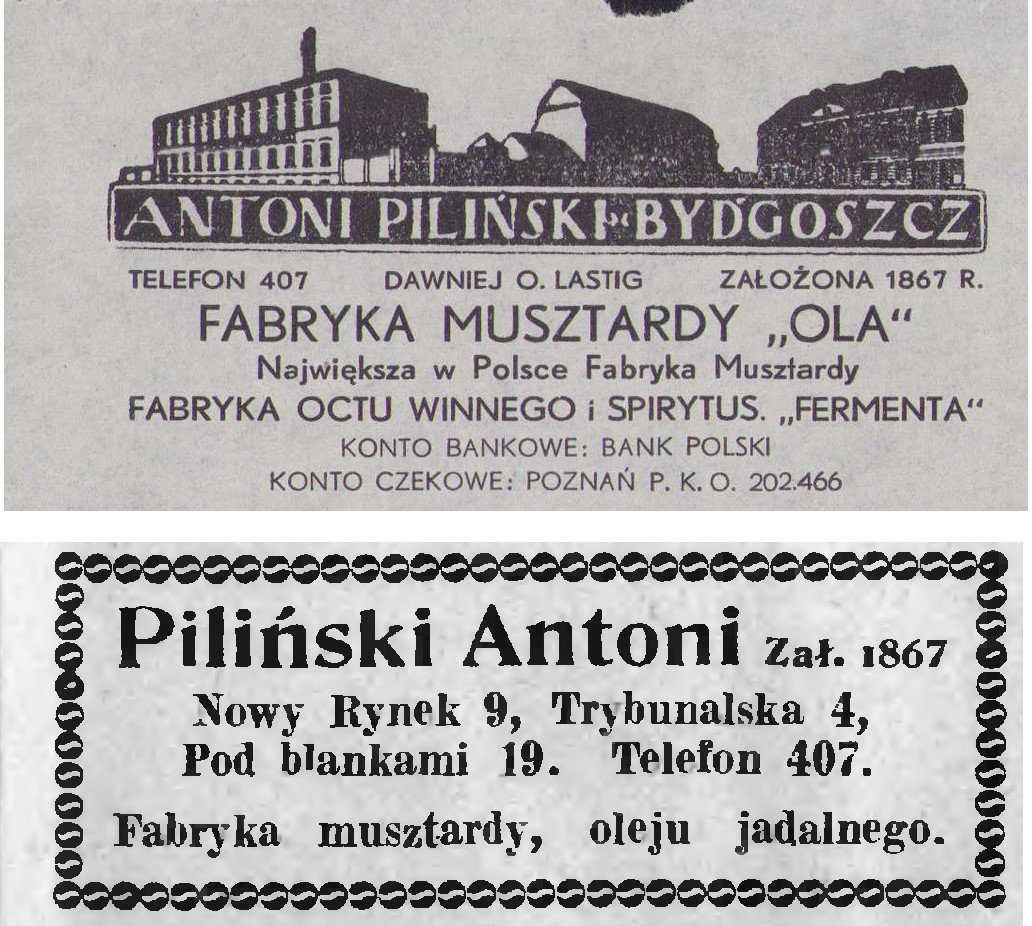
Advertising for Piliński products (1925-1934)

Tenement at 10
Registered on Kuyavian-Pomeranian Voivodeship Heritage List (Nr.601384, A/283/1-2), 13 December 2004
1844-1848
Neoclassical architecture

From 1849 to 1853, the building was used to accommodate overflow from the Royal Eastern Railway Directorate, which was housed at Nr.8. Between 1907 and 1914, it was the seat of the Prussian Chamber of Commerce (German: Handelskammer) which became the Polish Chamber of Industry and Commerce (Polish: Izba Przemysłowo-Handlowa in 1923, until the outbreak of WWII. During the German occupation, it was renamed Handelskammer, before reverting to its Polish name in 1945–1947. Currently, the building houses the siege of the Court, and the District Prosecutor's Office (Polish: Sąd i Prokuratura Rejonowa).

The neo-classicist front elevation is decorated with a plethora of ornamentation, such as cartouches filled with figures and vegetal motifs, lesenes, friezes, adorned pediments, and a top corbel table, and stuccoed garnishes inside. Renovated in 2008, it is similar to the neighbouring building at Nr.8

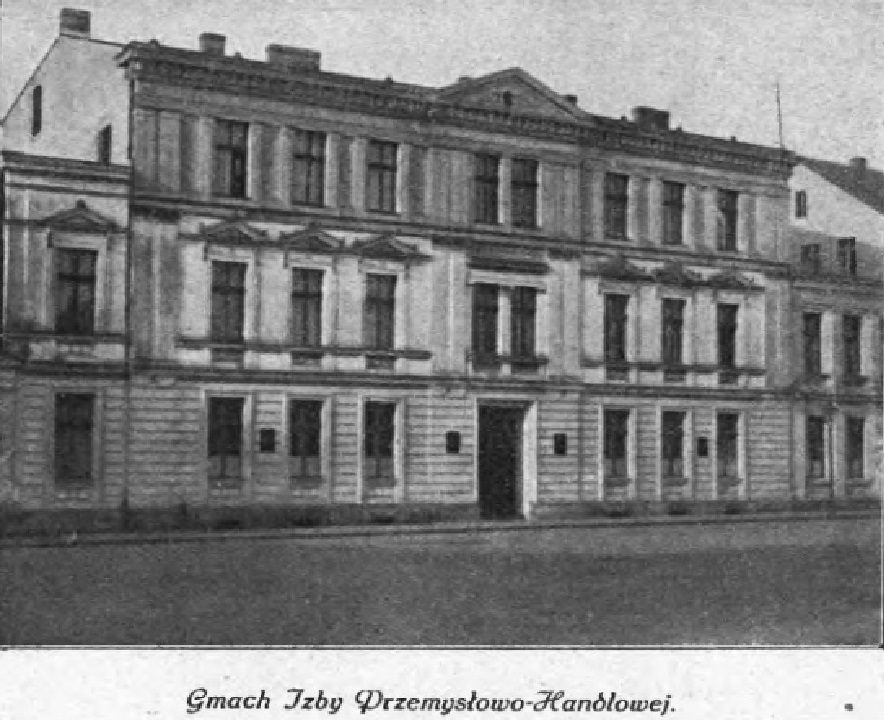
The building in 1929, as Chamber of Industry and Commerce

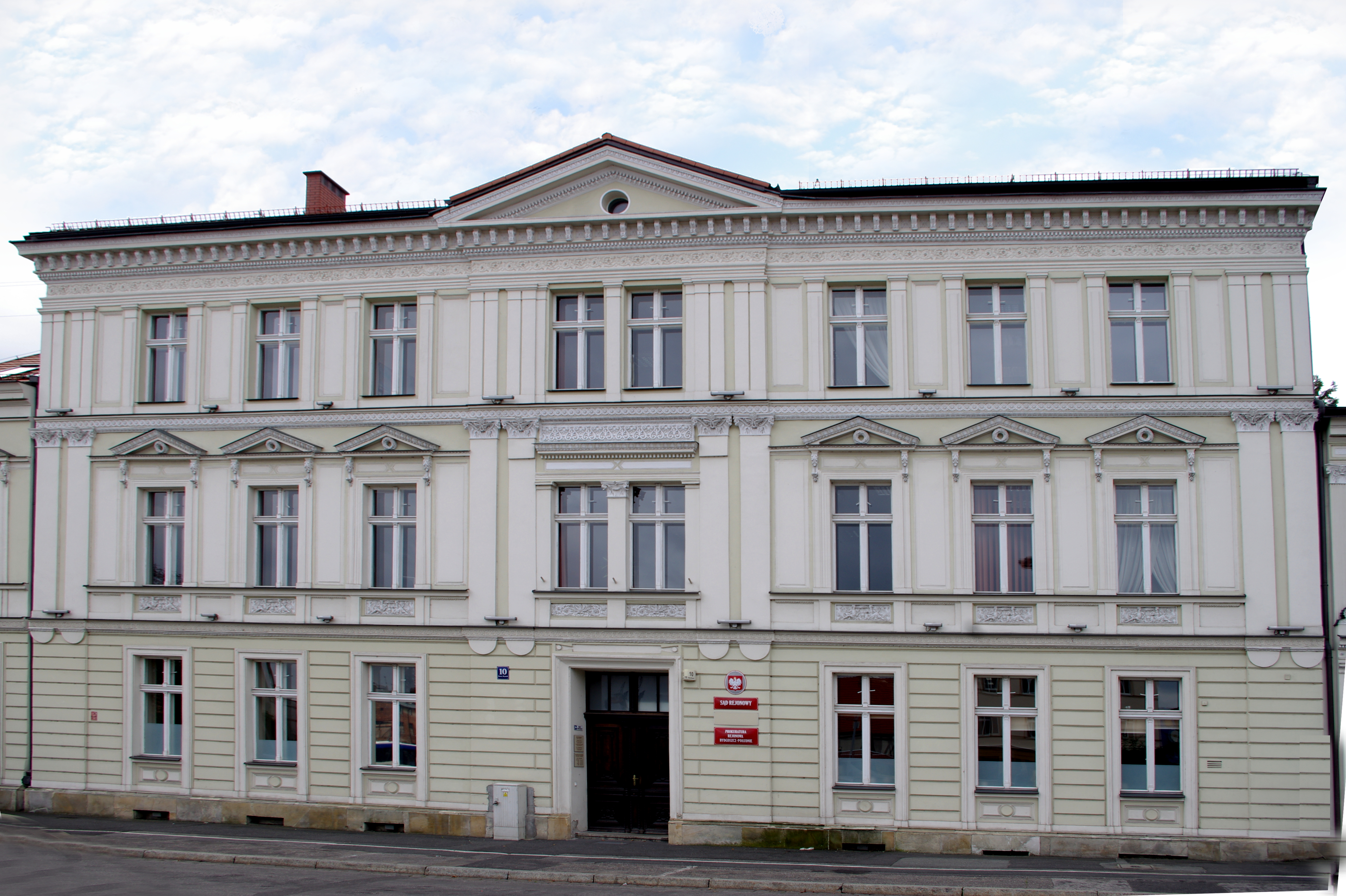
Current view of the main elevation

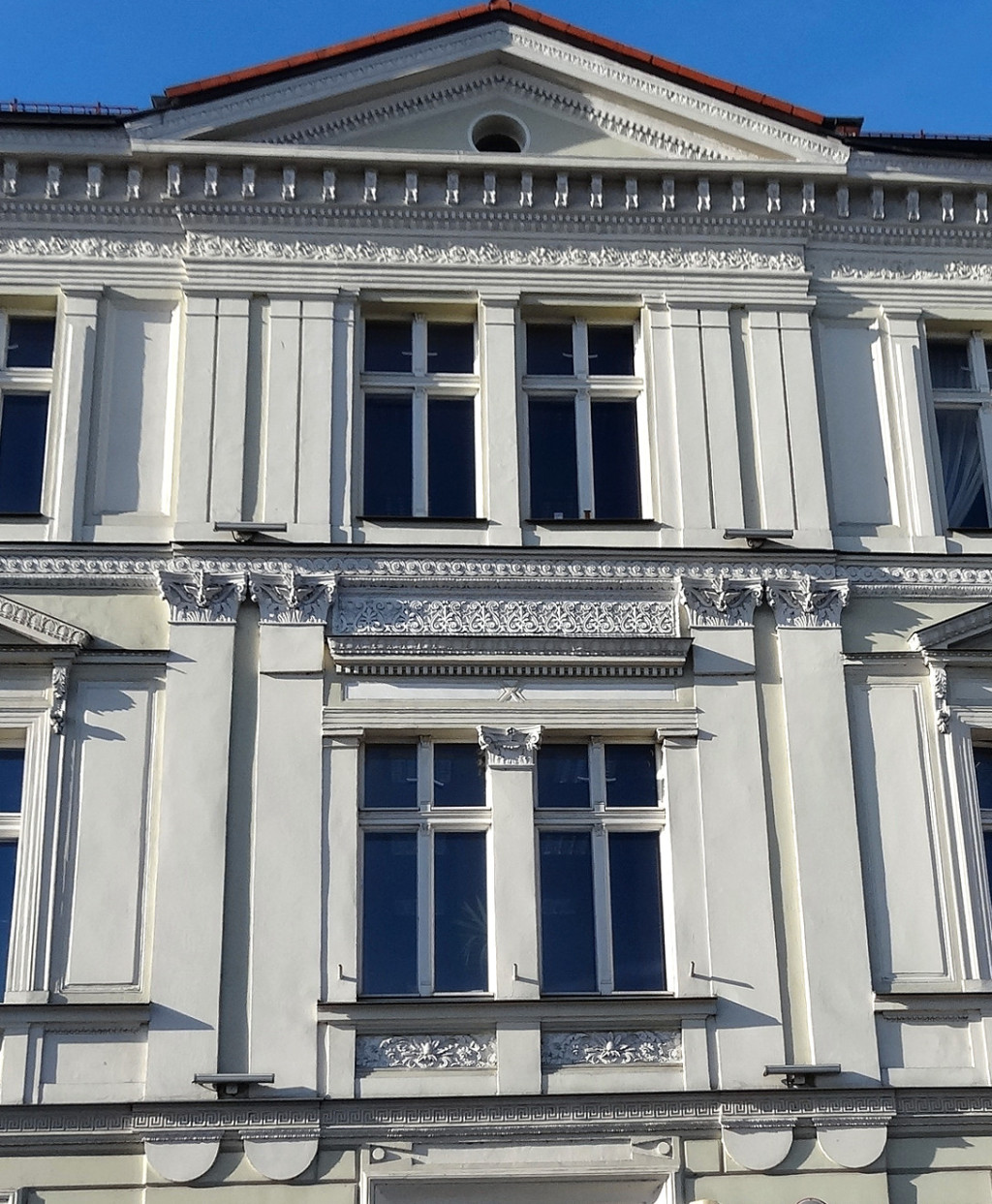
Detail of the façade

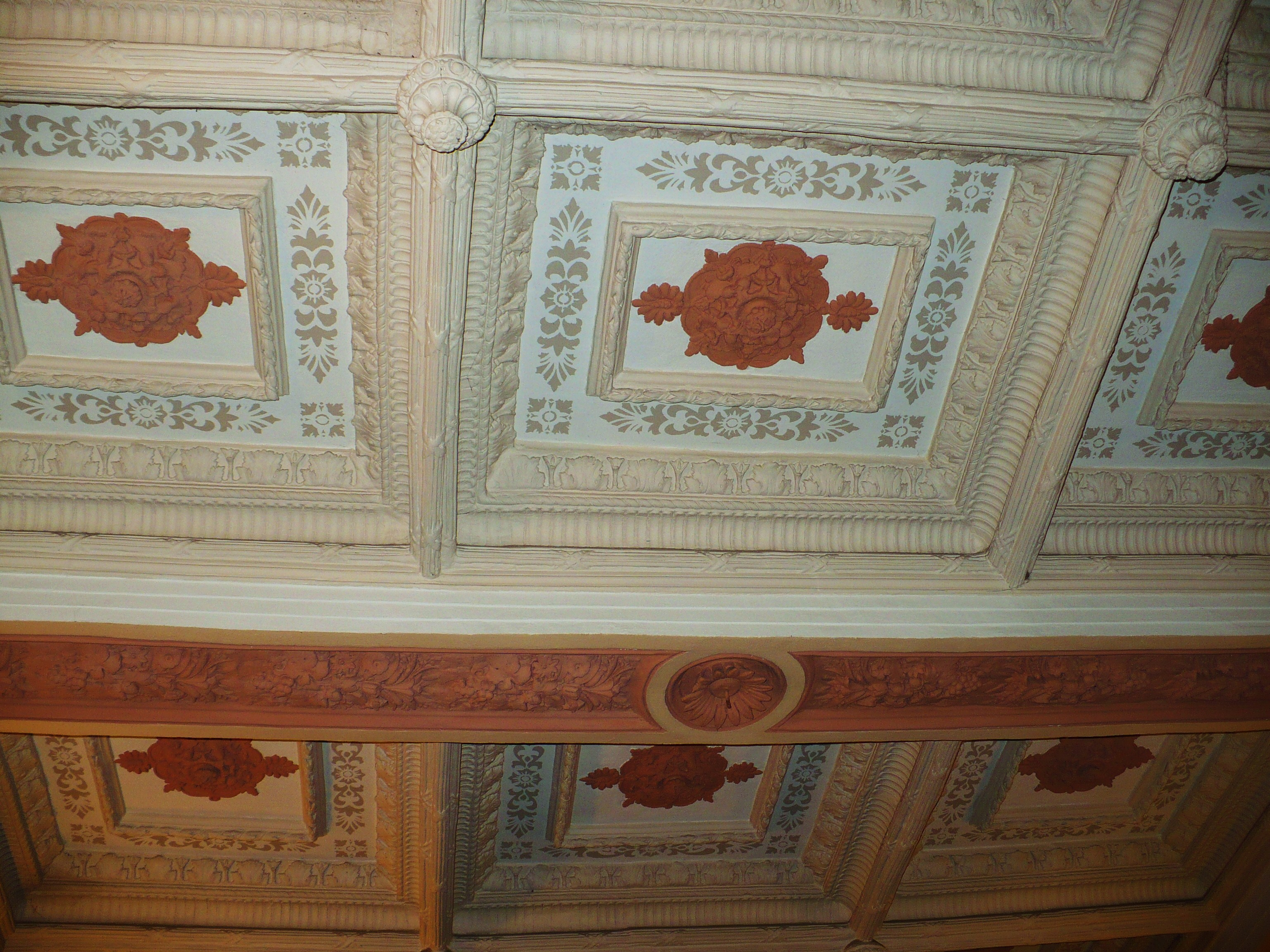
Coffer ceiling

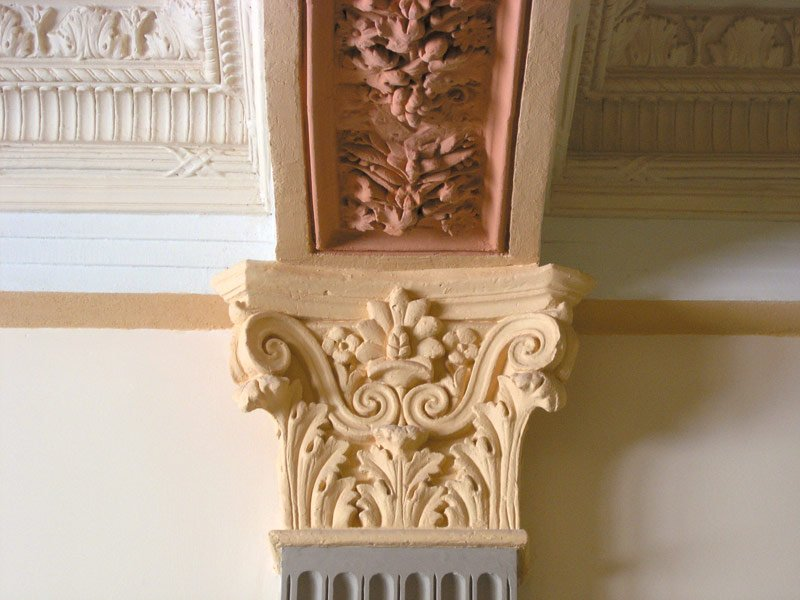
Stuccoed ornament (interiors)

District Court buildings at 2 Wały Jagiellońskie street and 12 Nowy Rynek
Registered on Kuyavian-Pomeranian Voivodeship Heritage List (Nr.601427, A/750), 7 October 1971
1903-1906 and 2019
Neo-gothic architecture

The building was designed by Eduard Saal de Bruyn (1848-1922), a Prussian advisor for governmental constructions from Berlin. From 1906 to 1918, the edifice housed the Prussian Royal Regional and District Court (German: Land- und Amtsgericht). During the interwar period, the City Court was based in the building. After WWII, it harboured the Provincial Court and today the District Court (Polish: Sąd Okręgowego w Bydgoszczy).

The old building displays features Neo-Gothic style, incorporating elements from Neo-Renaissance and Modern architecture. The front elevation on Wały Jagiellońskie street is framed by two bay windows bearing pinnacles, flanking a tall wall gable, which is also replicated on the gable facing the square. The characteristic part of the edifice is its 44 meters (144 ft) tall octagonal tower, equipped at the top with a viewing gallery crowned by a neo-baroque ridge turret. The façades bear, among other details, the coat of arms of Bydgoszcz and the Coat of arms of Prussia. The building is an architectural dominant piece of the southern Old Town landscape.

An extension to the historical building was unveiled on September 20, 2019, at 12 Nowy Rynek. It has 4 stories, with a two-storey underground car park. There are 10 rooms inside for hearings, conference rooms, and space for detainees and witnesses. The cost of the investment amounted to over 17 million PLN. The extension was built on the site of an old red brick warehouse, which was not protected by the monument conservation register.

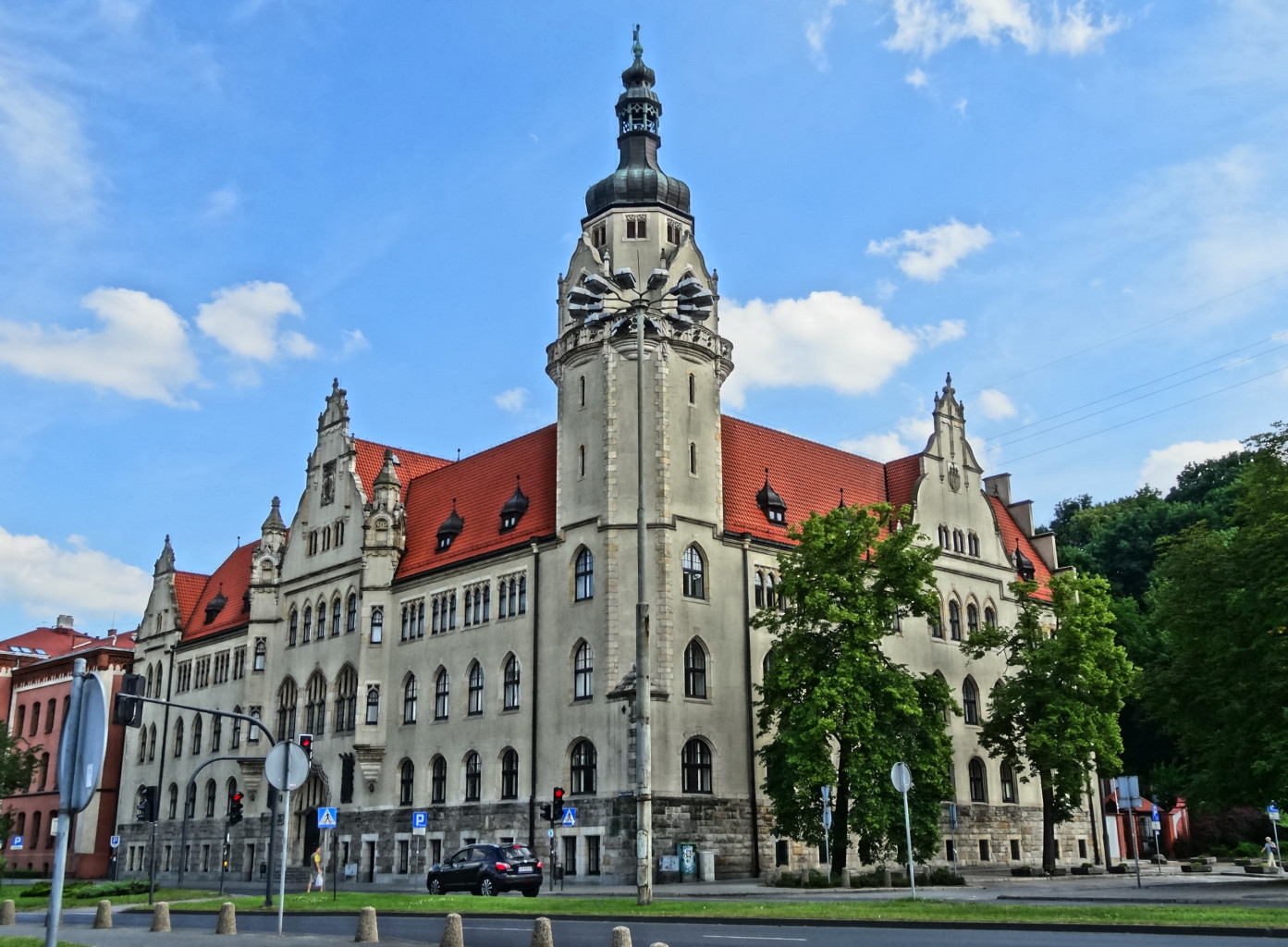
View from the square

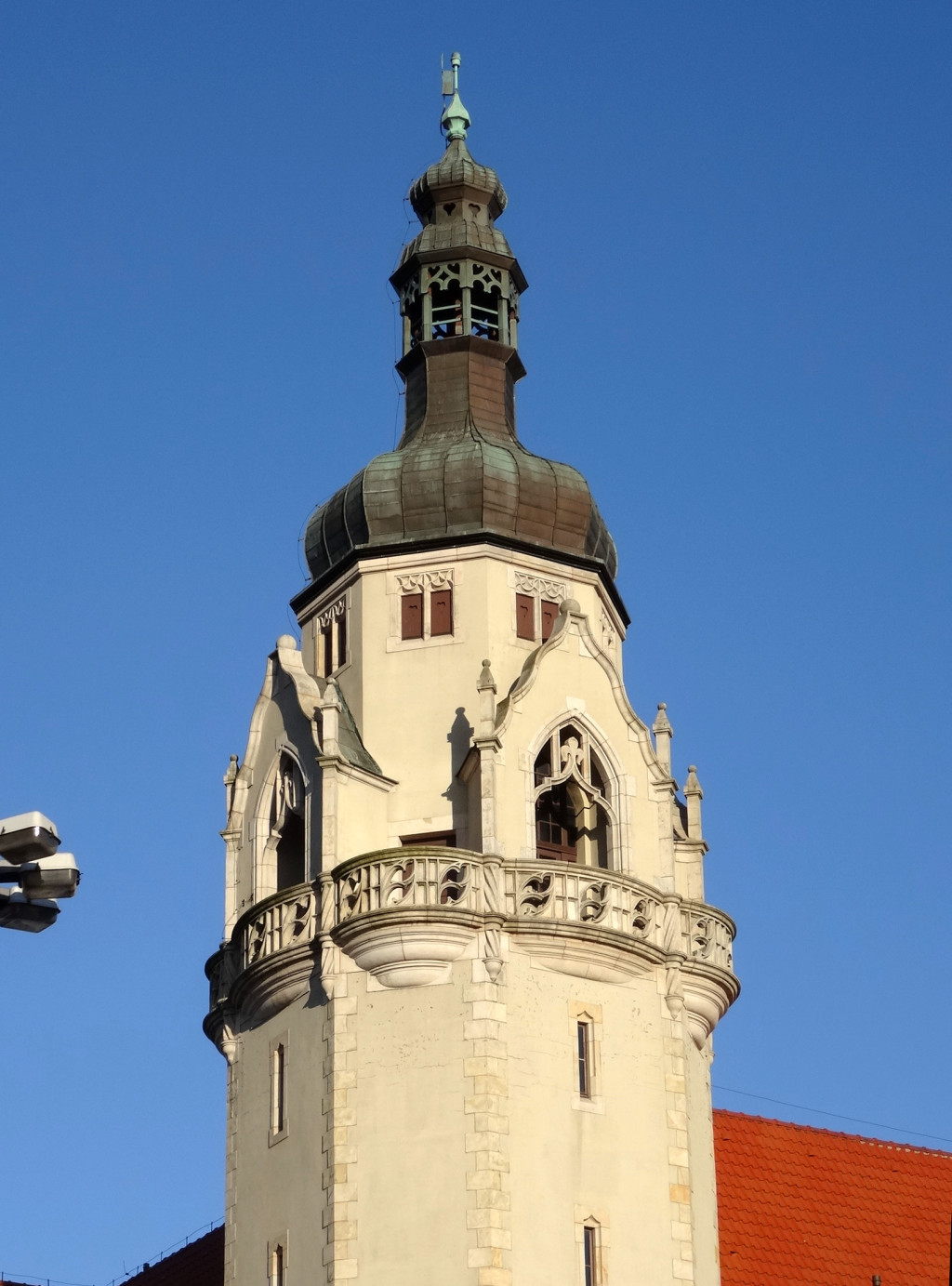
Detail of the tower

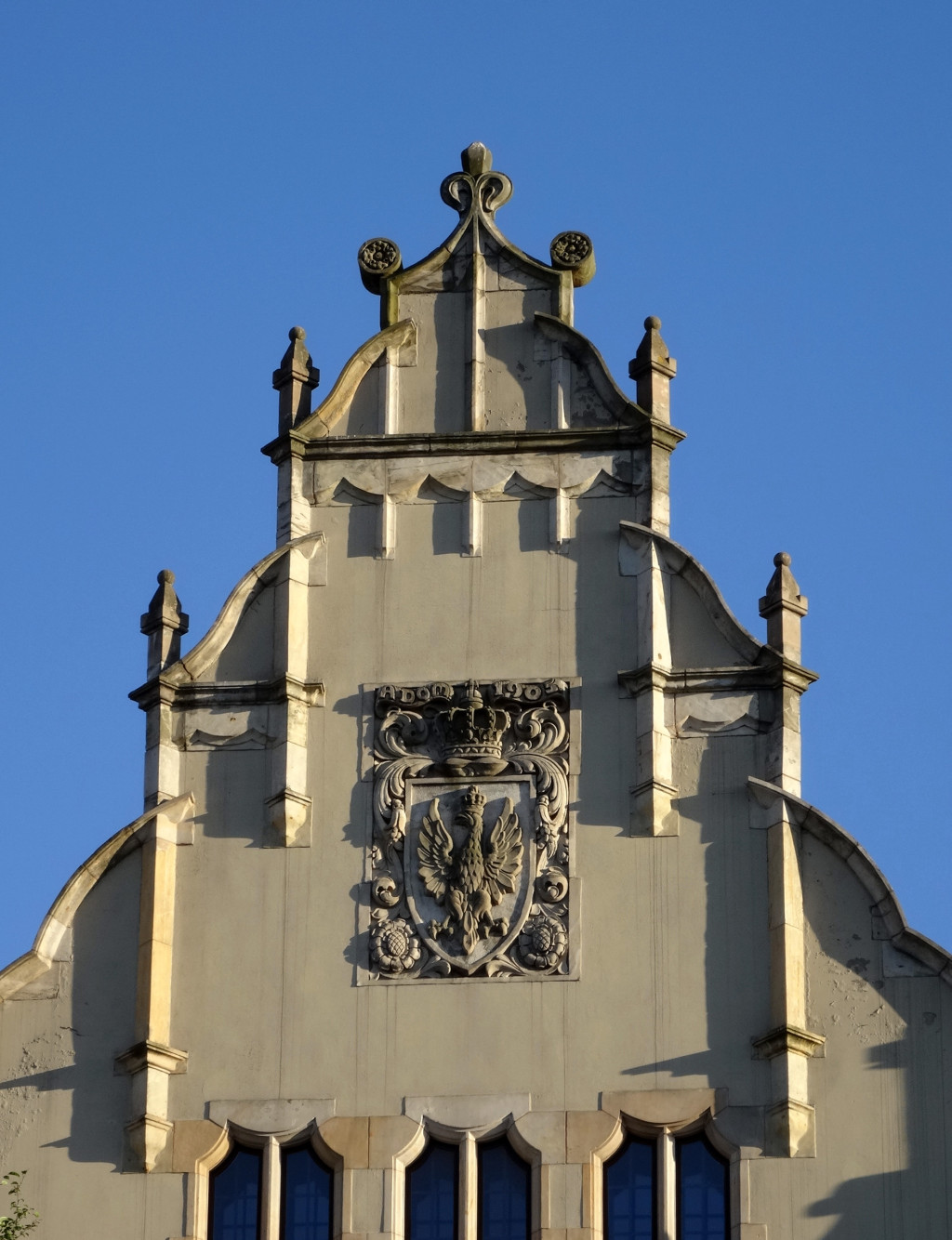
Gable onto Wały Jagiellońskie street

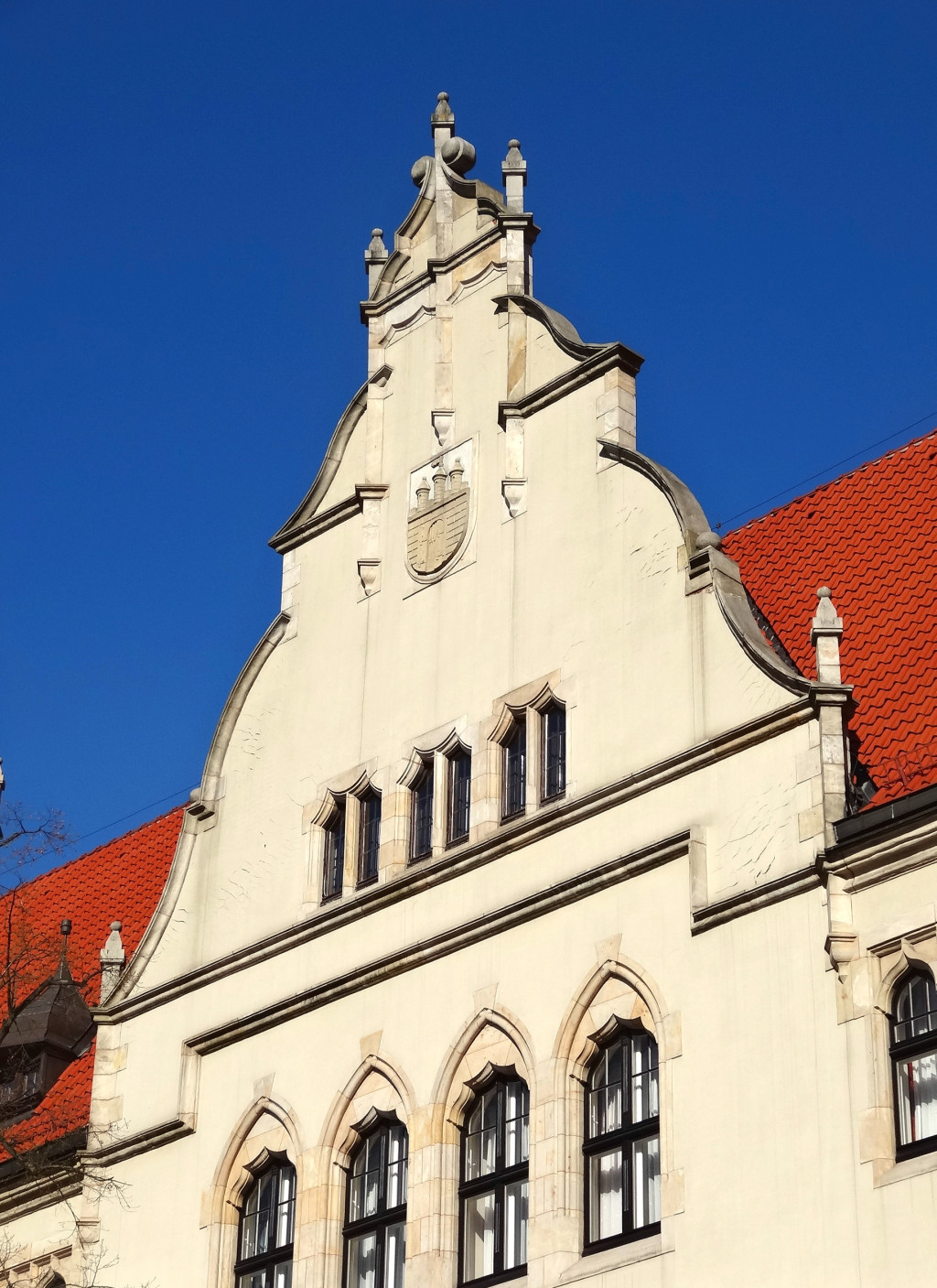
Gable onto the square

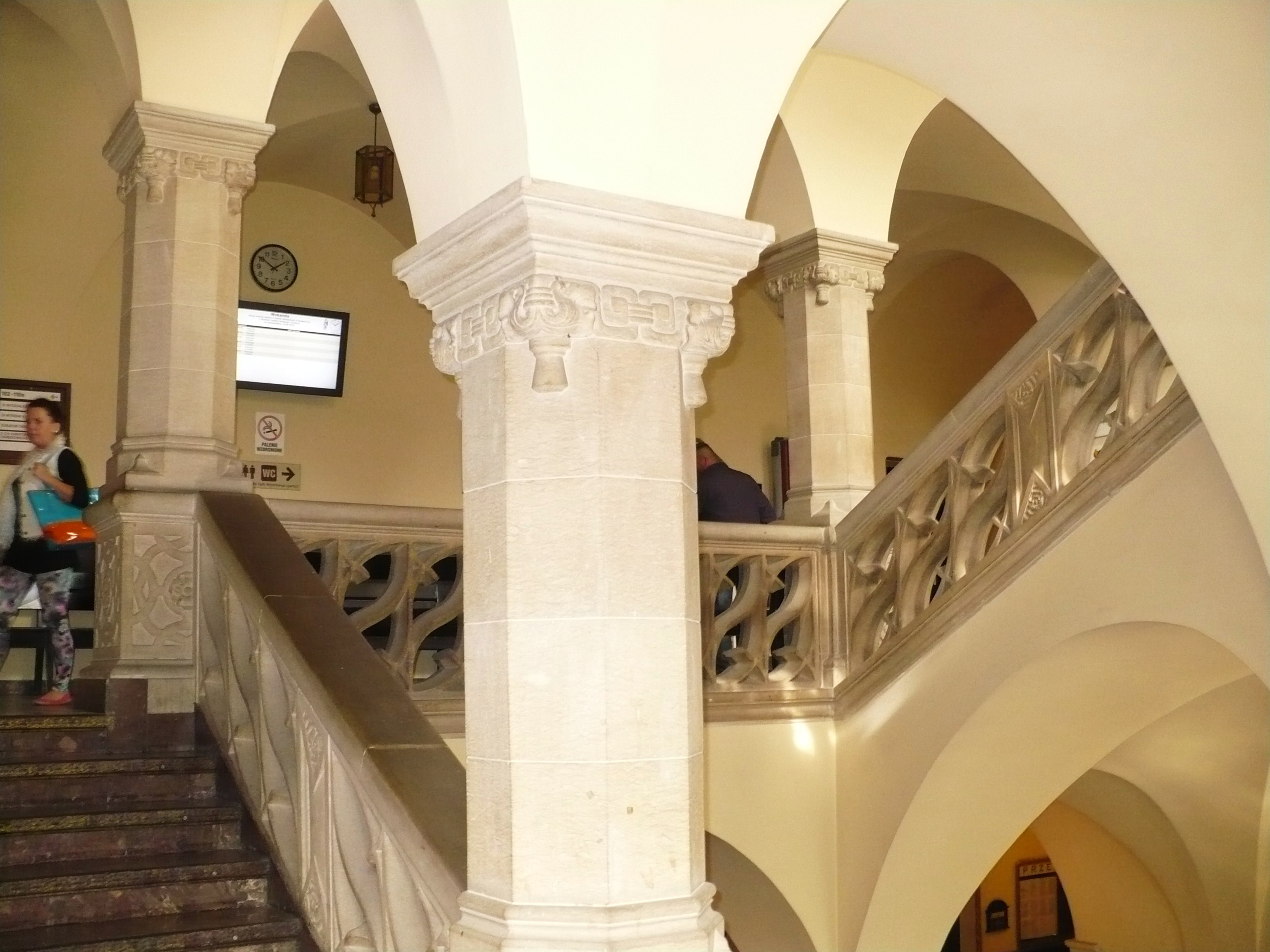
Grand stone staircase

Monument to Casimir III the Great
2006, equestrian statue by Mariusz Białecki

This location used to be, among others, a plot owned by the city masonic lodge Janus to the East (Polish: Janus na Wschodzie), consisting of two buildings. The first building was torn down during construction to widen Wały Jagiellońskie street in 1930, while the second burnt down in a fire in 1945.

The concept of a monument to Casimir the Great emerged at the celebration of the 650th anniversary of the city's founding in 1996. The monument was to be a tribute to the king who gave Bydgoszcz Town privileges on April 19, 1346. Funding came from public fundraising and city authorities. On August 16, 2001, a nationwide competition for the design of the monument was announced, and adjudicated on March 14, 2002. Sculptor Mariusz Białecki, from Gdańsk, won the competition. Initially, Theatre square was identified as the location. However, on January 10, 2006, the committee decided to erect the monument on the place between Nowy Rynek and Pod Blankami street, where the former city walls used to stand. The unveiling ceremony took place on October 26, 2006, presided by Konstanty Dombrowicz, then city mayor.

The monument was cast in the studio of Robert Sobociński, in Siemianów, near Śrem, by the Poznań sculpture studio "Art-Product". The sculpture shows the king in armor riding a horse. Casimir is holding a sceptre in his right hand and a scroll in his left hand, representing the town privileges. The monarch's face has been modelled on the portrait by Jan Matejko. The 3-ton statue is made of bronze, and stands on a red granite pedestal made by a Swedish company from Gniewkowo, weighing 20 tons. Together with the pedestal, the statue is 7 meters (23 ft) high.

On the pedestal a commemorative plaque is located, with the inscription: Casimir III the Great, King of Poland 1333-1370. Founder of the city of Bydgoszcz on April 19, 1346.

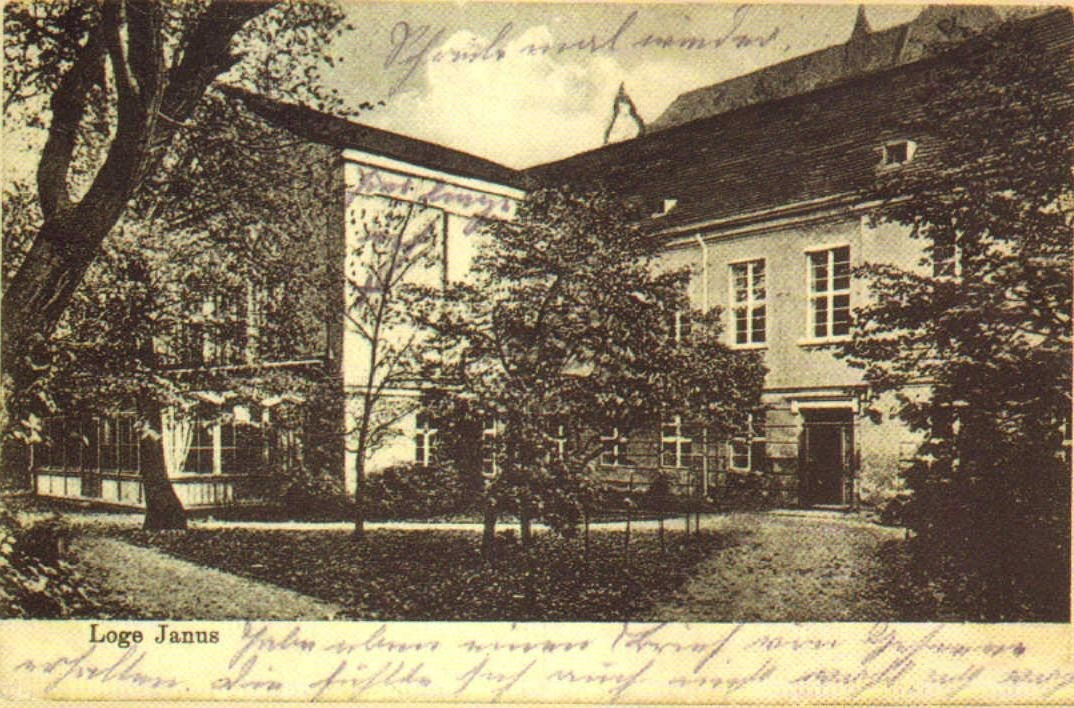
Ancient "Janus Lodge" in 1906

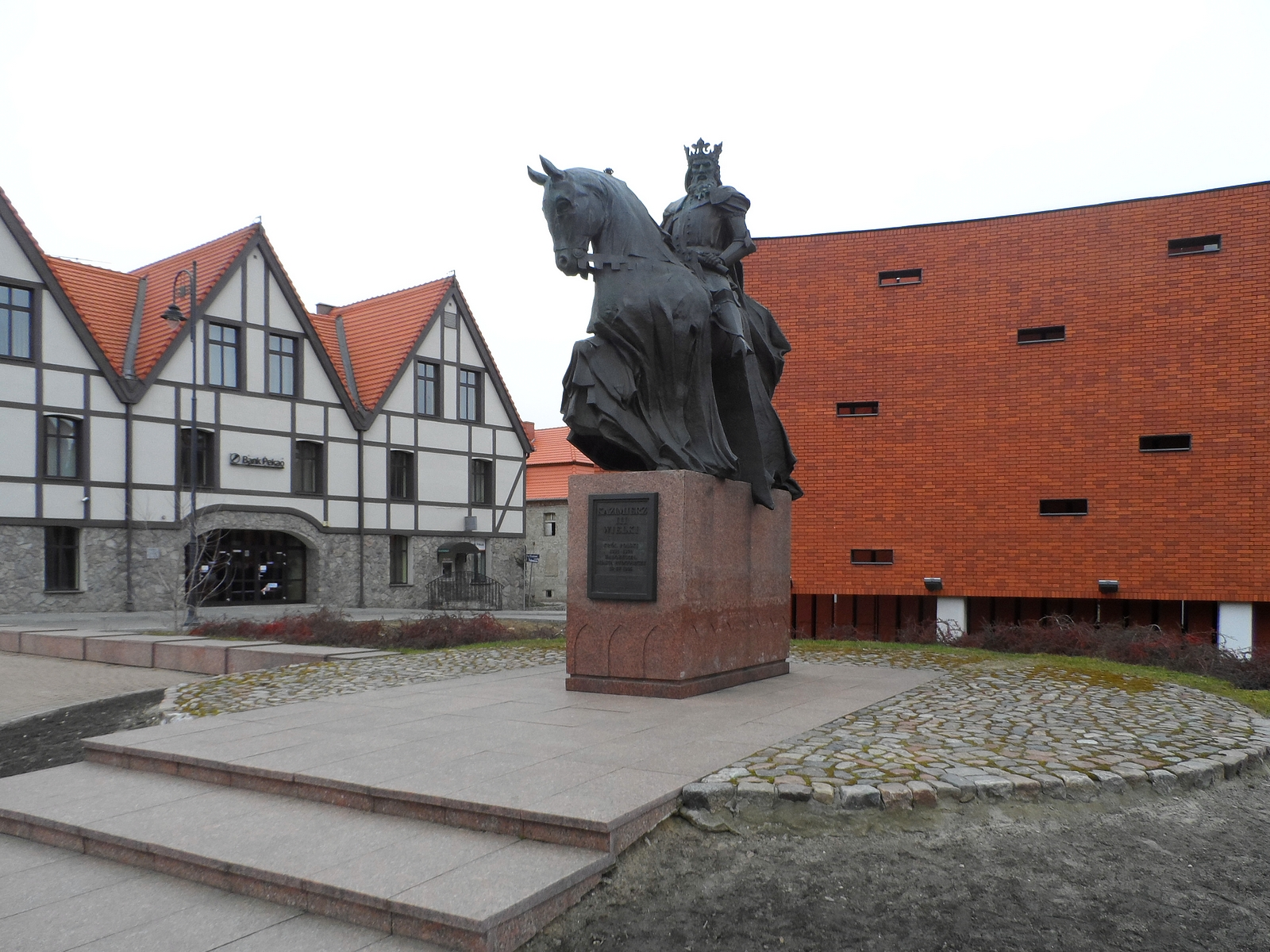
Monument to Casimir the Great

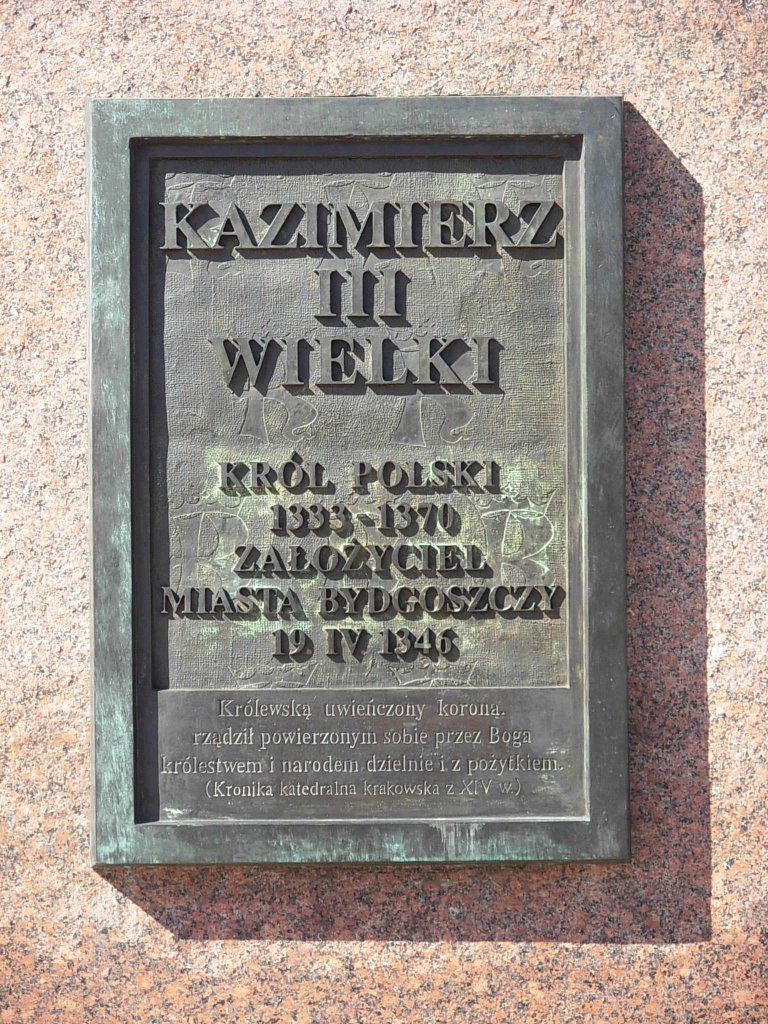
Commemorative plaque

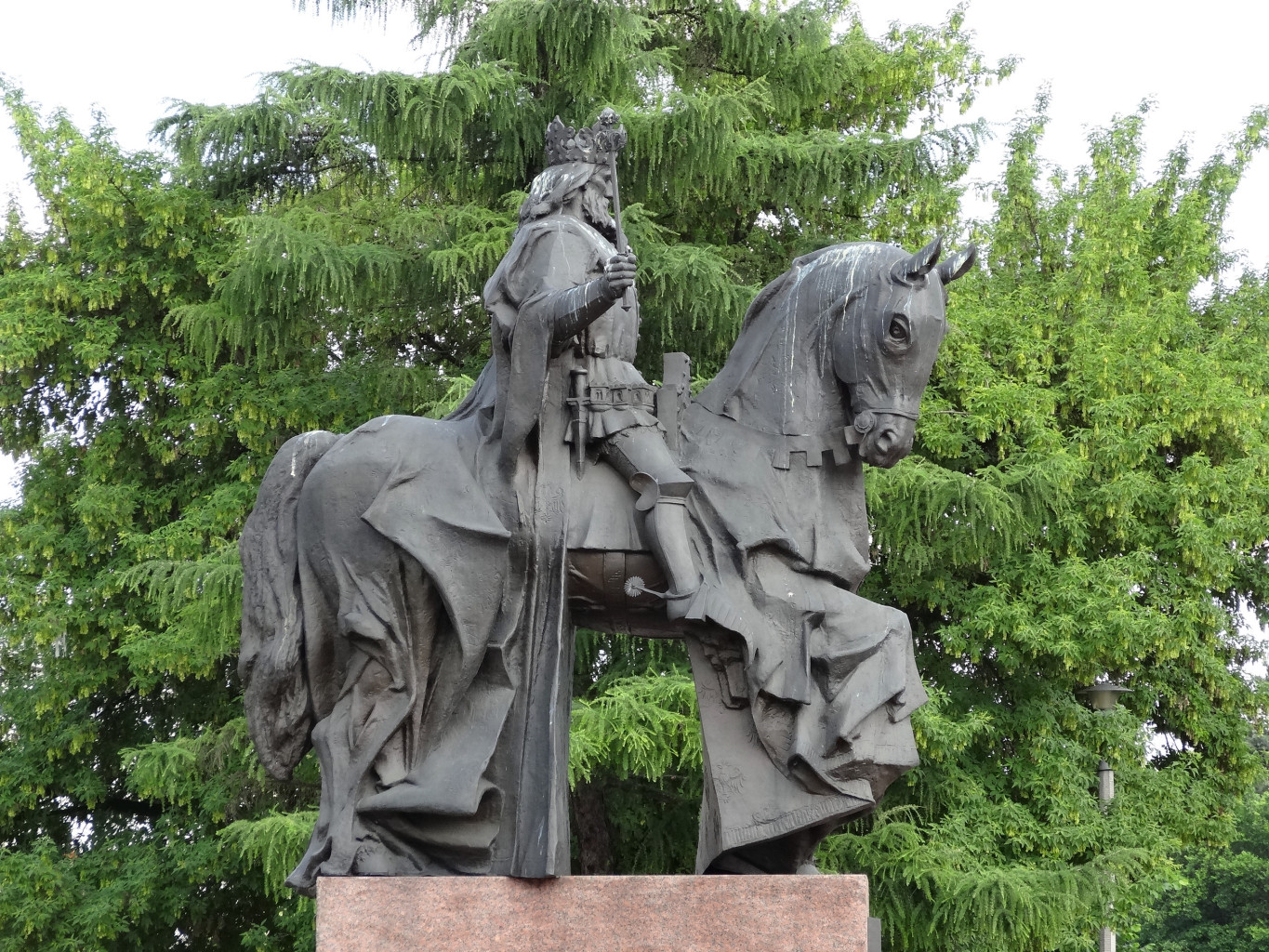
Side view

== Gallery ==
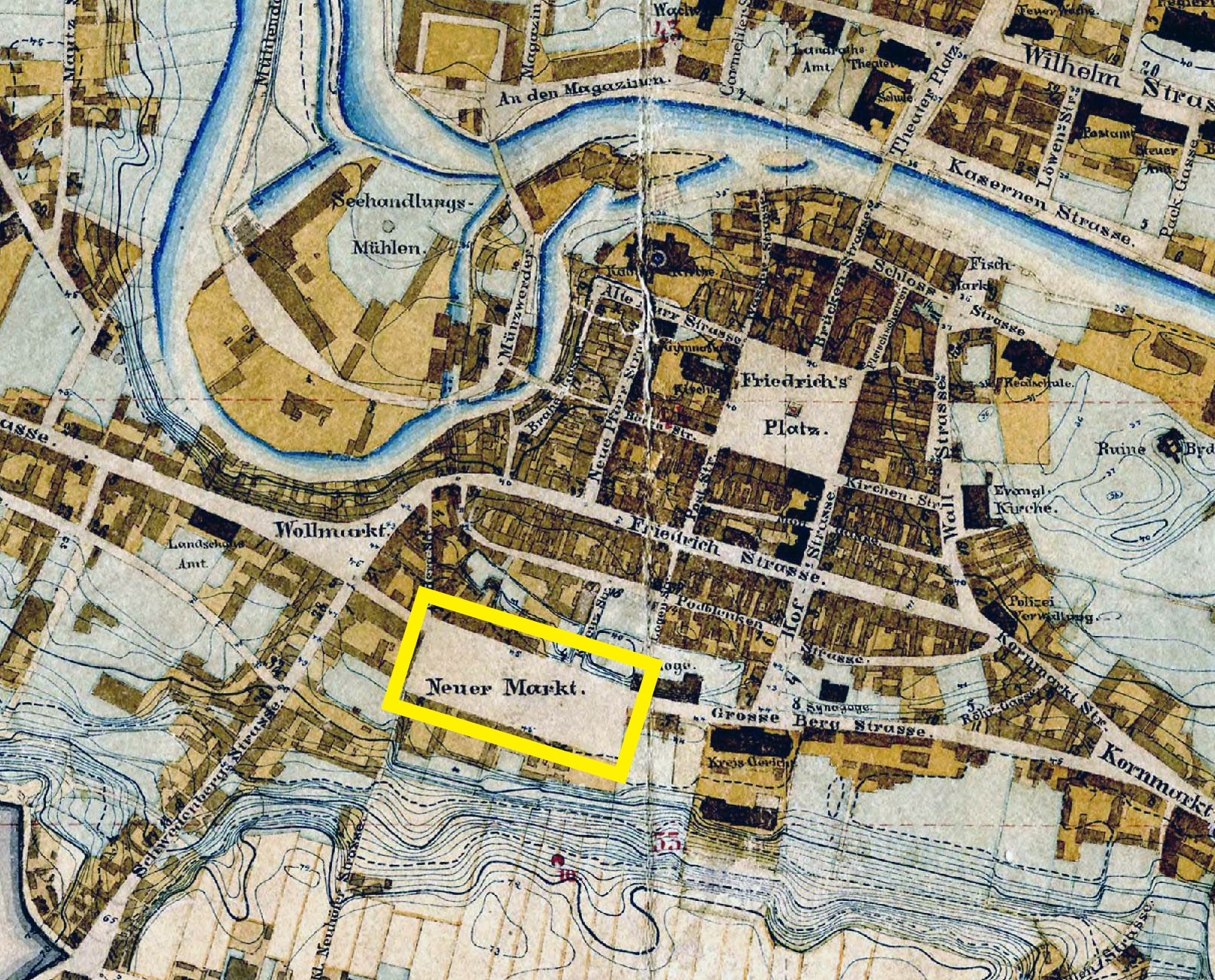
Neuer Markt on a 1880 map of Bromberg

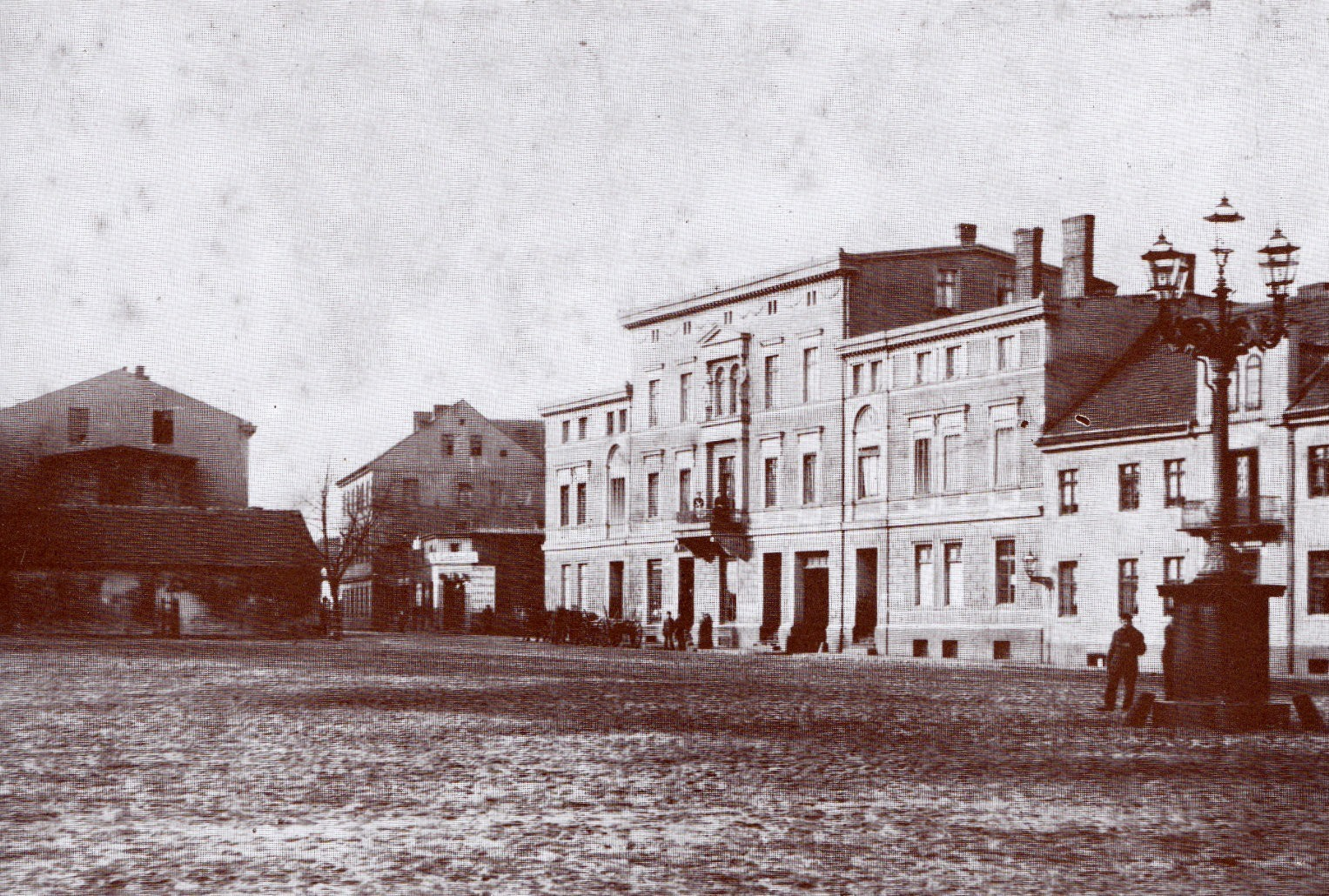
Northern side of the square in 1886

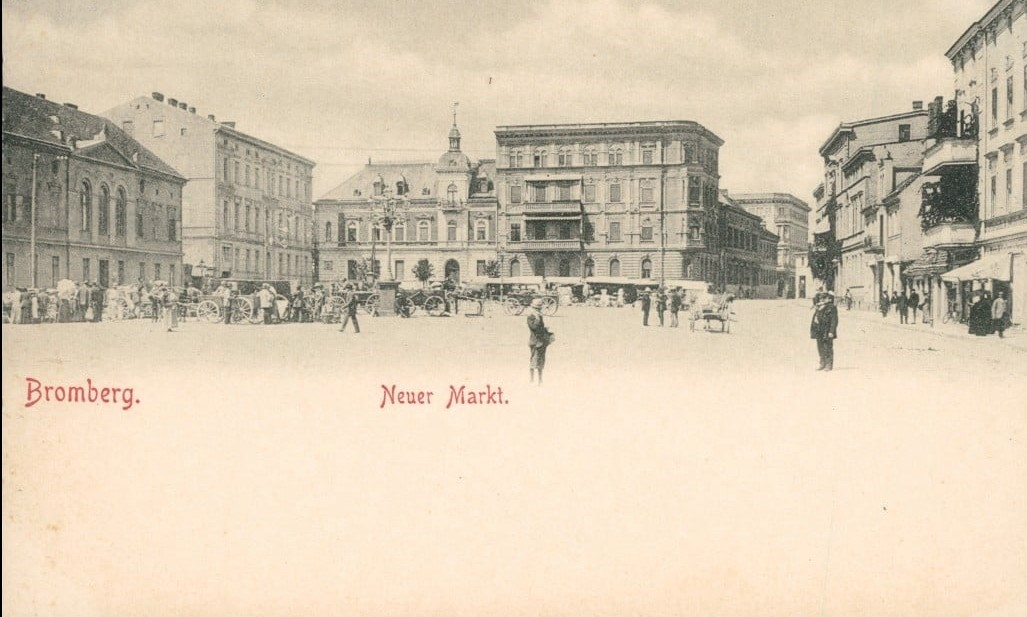
The square in 1902

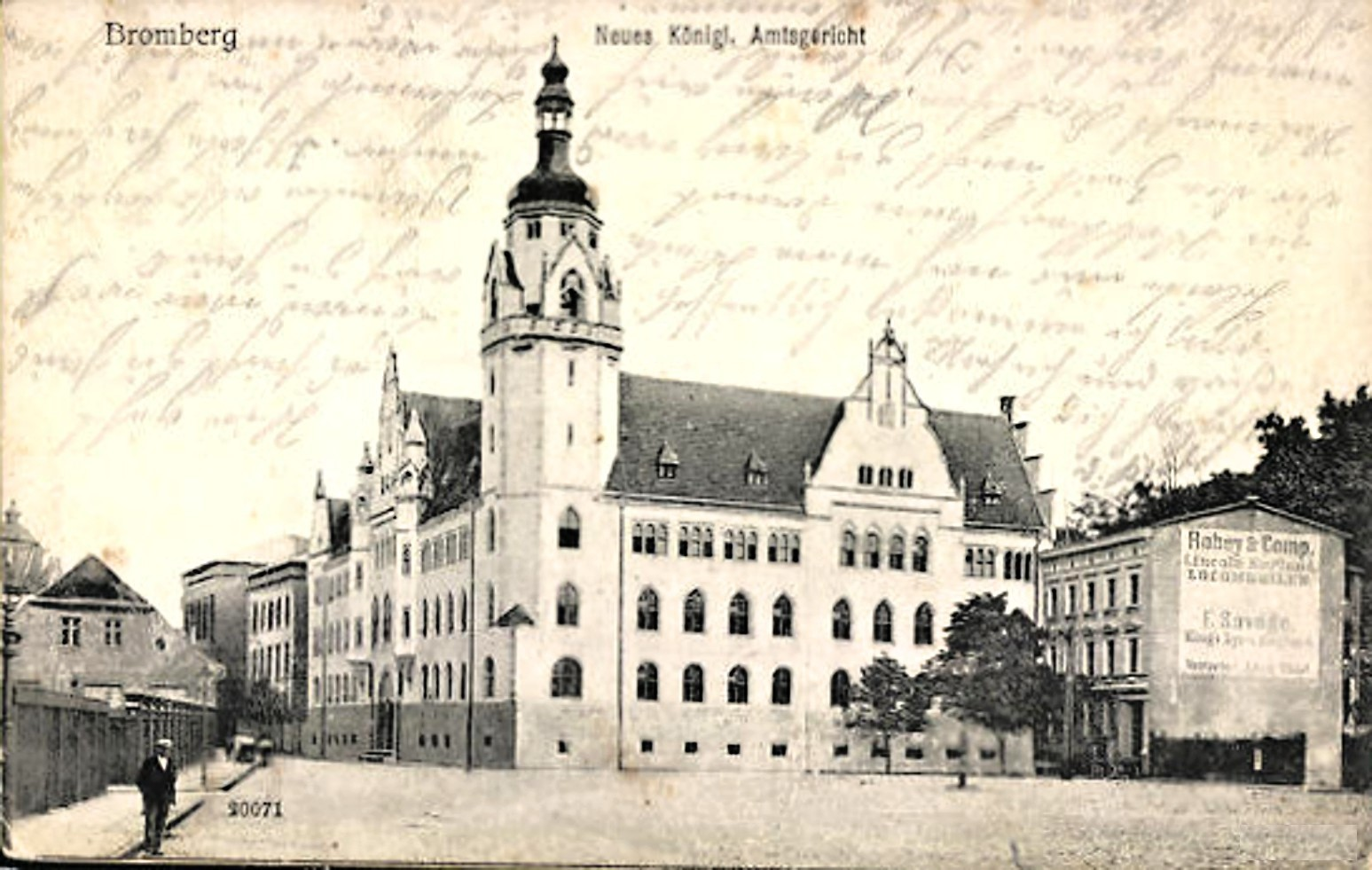
View of the District court in 1905

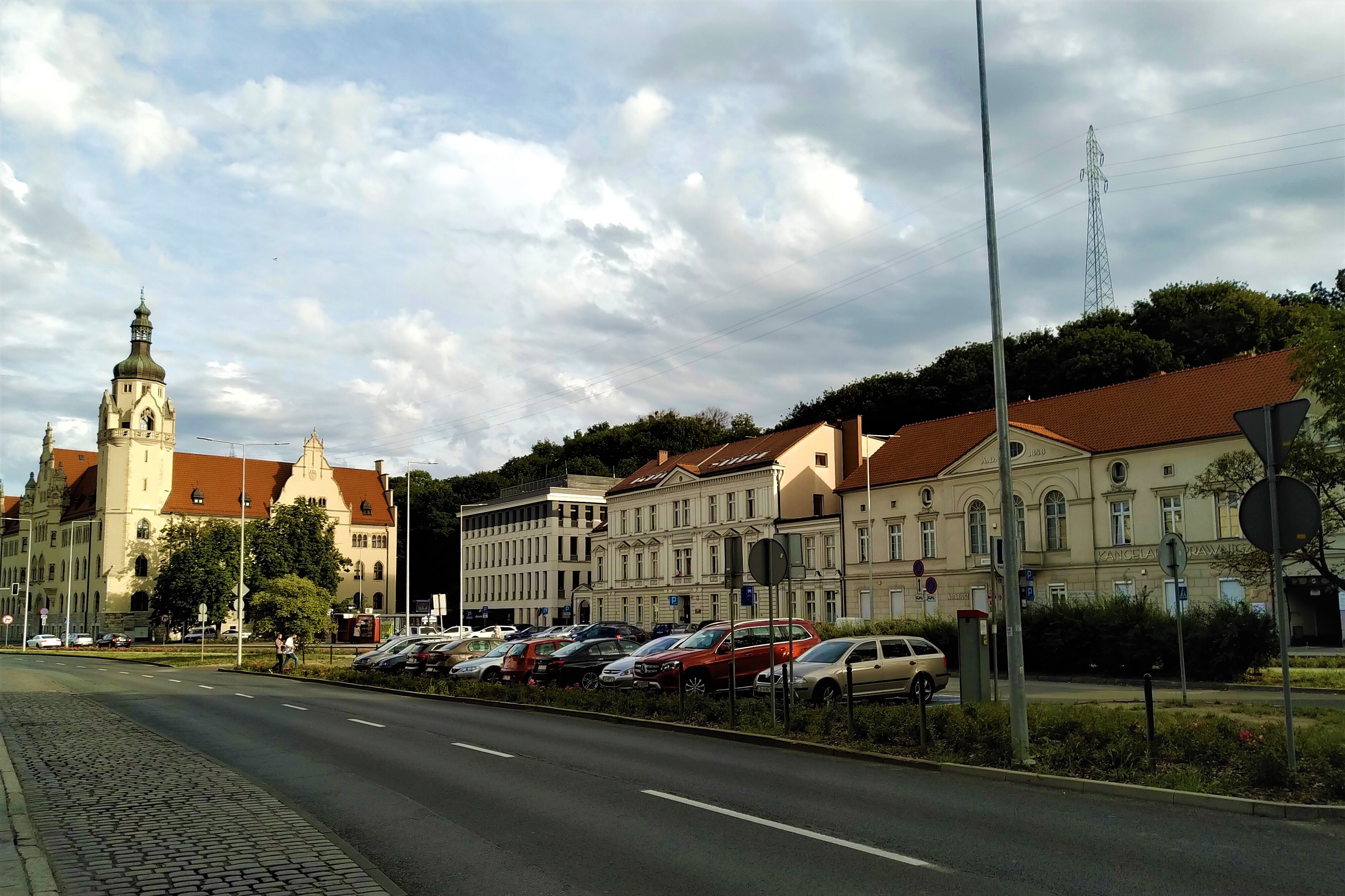
Current view of south elevations

== See also ==
- Bydgoszcz
- Henryk Dąbrowski Park and Aleja Górska in Bydgoszcz
- Józef Milchert

== Bibliography ==
- (in Polish) Umiński, Janusz (1996). Bydgoszcz-Przewodnik. Bydgoszcz: Regionalny Oddział PTTK „Szlak Brdy”.
- (in Polish) Parucka, Krystyna (2008). Zabytki Bydgoszczy – minikatalog. Bydgoszcz: „Tifen” Krystyna Parucka. ISBN 9788392719106.
- (in Polish) Lech, Łbik (2008). Bydgoski pomnik Kazimierza Wielkiego. Władca, potomni, idea, dzieło. Materiały do dziejów kultury i sztuki Bydgoszczy i regionu. zeszyt 13. Bydgoszcz: Pracownia Dokumentacji i Popularyzacji Zabytków Wojewódzkiego Ośrodka Kultury w Bydgoszczy.
