= Owieczki, Gniezno County =

Owieczki
- Village
- Location within Poland
- Coordinates: 52°33′N 17°27′E
- Country: Poland
- Voivodeship: Greater Poland
- County: Gniezno
- Gmina: Łubowo

Owieczki [ɔˈvjɛt͡ʂki] is a village in the administrative district of Gmina Łubowo, within Gniezno County, Greater Poland Voivodeship, in west-central Poland.
