= Chwałkówko =

- Village
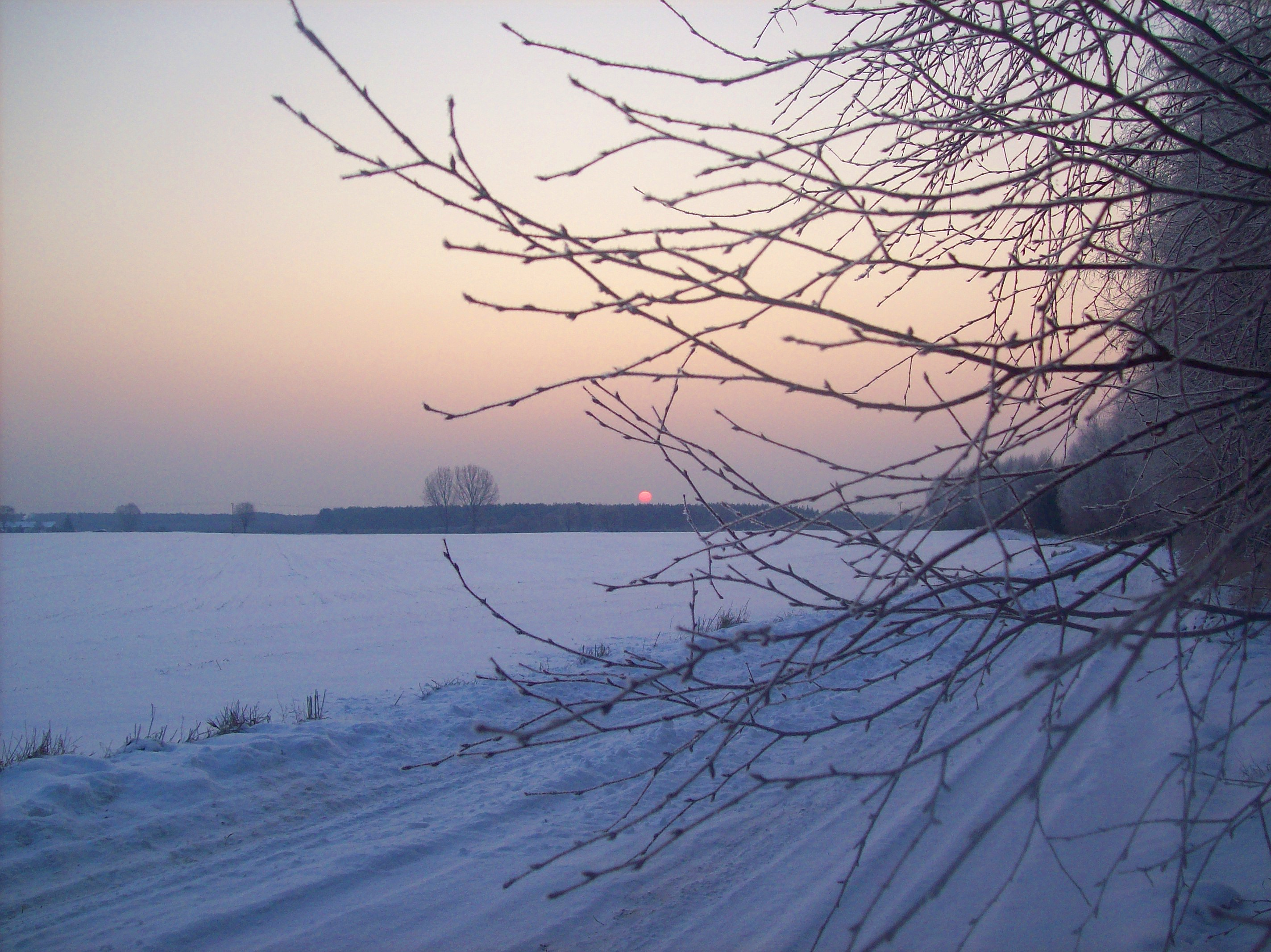

- Location within Poland
- Coordinates: 52°28′28″N 17°24′48″E
- Country: Poland
- Voivodeship: Greater Poland
- County: Gniezno
- Gmina: Łubowo

Chwałkówko [xfau̯ˈkufkɔ] is a village in the administrative district of Gmina Łubowo, within Gniezno County, Greater Poland Voivodeship, in west-central Poland.
