= Woźniki, Gniezno County =

Woźniki
- Village
- Location within Poland
- Coordinates: 52°31′N 17°30′E
- Country: Poland
- Voivodeship: Greater Poland
- County: Gniezno
- Gmina: Łubowo

Woźniki [vɔʑˈniki] is a village in the administrative district of Gmina Łubowo, within Gniezno County, Greater Poland Voivodeship, in west-central Poland. The village has a small population and is known for its rural character and proximity to regional landmarks, including the historic city of Gniezno.
