= Moraczewo, Gniezno County =

Moraczewo
- Village
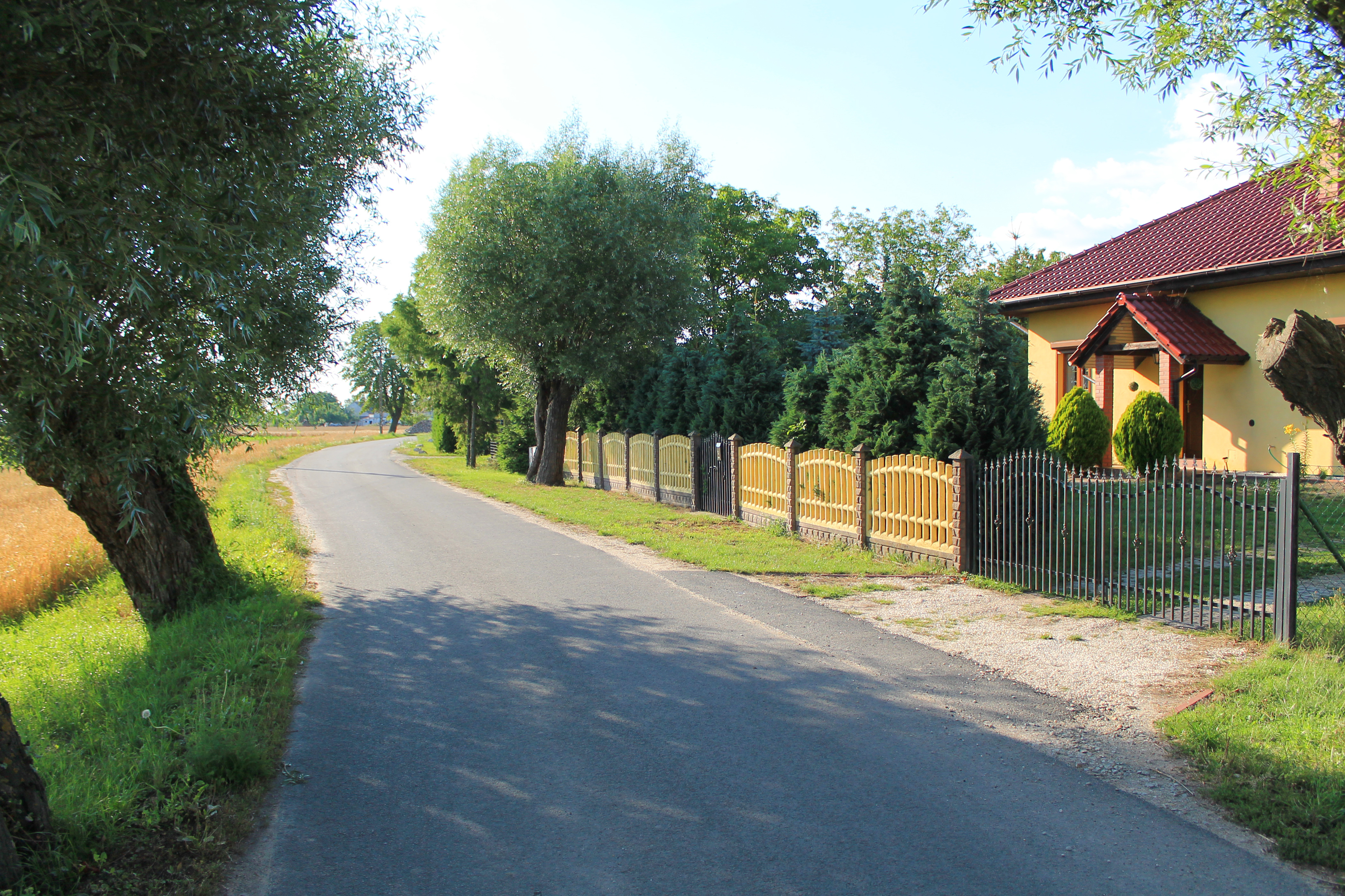
- Roadside house in Moraczewo

- Location within Poland
- Coordinates: 52°30′16″N 17°20′30″E
- Country: Poland
- Voivodeship: Greater Poland
- County: Gniezno

Moraczewo [mɔraˈt͡ʂɛvɔ] is a village in the administrative district of Gmina Łubowo, within Gniezno County, Greater Poland Voivodeship, in west-central Poland.
