= Strychowo =

- Village
- Location within Poland
- Coordinates: 52°33′N 17°30′E
- Country: Poland
- Voivodeship: Greater Poland
- County: Gniezno
- Gmina: Łubowo

Strychowo [strɨˈxɔvɔ] is a village in the administrative district of Gmina Łubowo, within Gniezno County, Greater Poland Voivodeship, in west-central Poland.
