= Rybitwy, Greater Poland Voivodeship =

Rybitwy
- Village
- Location within Poland
- Coordinates: 52°31′N 17°21′E
- Country: Poland
- Voivodeship: Greater Poland
- County: Gniezno
- Gmina: Łubowo

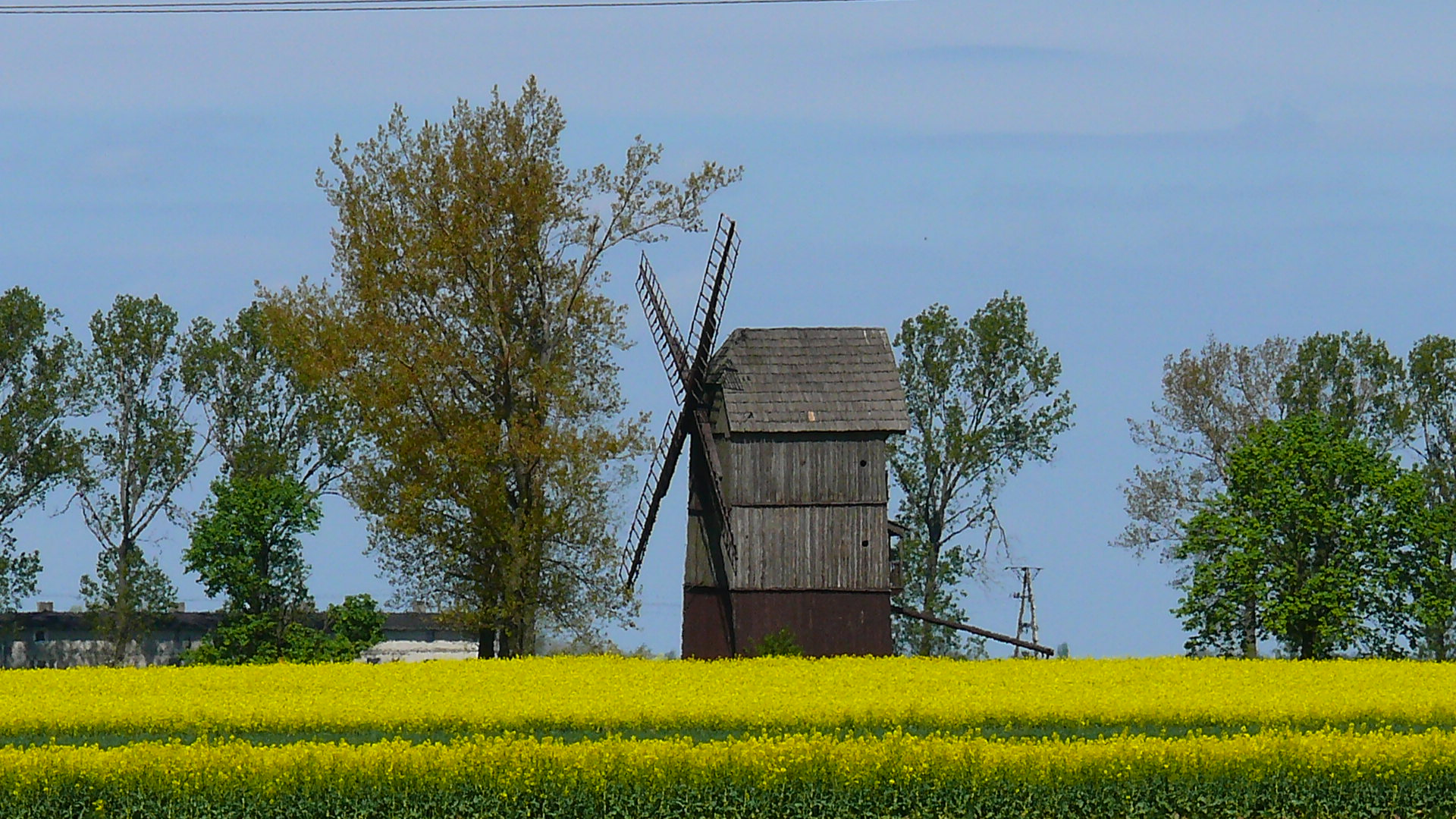
Windmill in Rybitwy

Rybitwy [rɨˈbitfɨ] is a village in the administrative district of Gmina Łubowo, within Gniezno County, Greater Poland Voivodeship, in west-central Poland.
