= Leśniewo, Greater Poland Voivodeship =

Leśniewo
- Village
- Location within Poland
- Coordinates: 52°29′N 17°28′E
- Country: Poland
- Voivodeship: Greater Poland
- County: Gniezno
- Gmina: Łubowo

Leśniewo [lɛɕˈɲɛvɔ] is a village in the administrative district of Gmina Łubowo, within Gniezno County, Greater Poland Voivodeship, in west-central Poland.
