= Łubowo, Greater Poland Voivodeship =

Łubowo
- Village
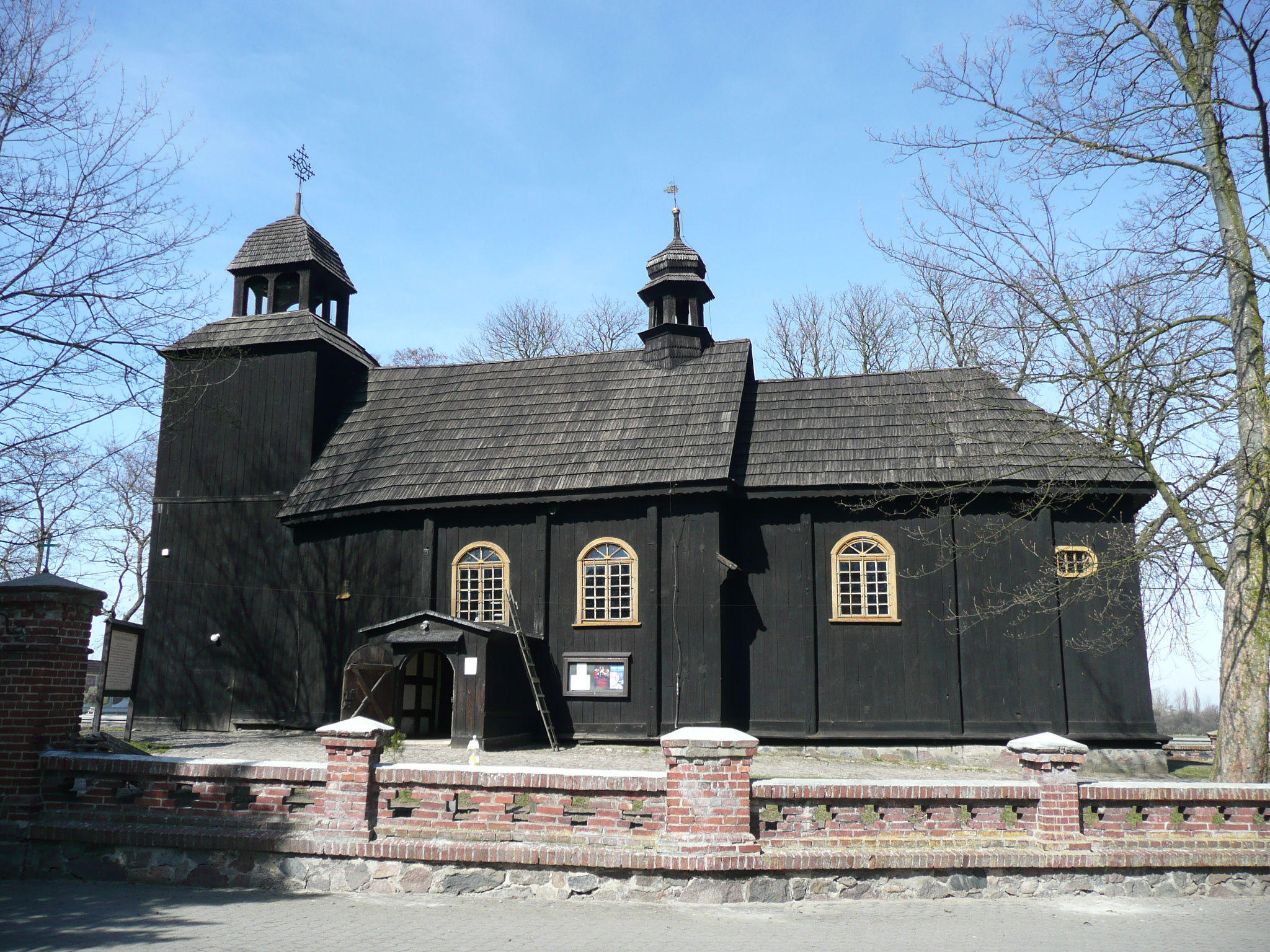
- Church of Saint Nicholas

- Location within Poland
- Coordinates: 52°30′45″N 17°27′16″E
- Country: Poland
- Voivodeship: Greater Poland
- County: Gniezno
- Gmina: Łubowo

Population
  - Total: 951
- Climate: Dfb

Łubowo [wuˈbɔvɔ] (German: Libau) is a village in Gniezno County, Greater Poland Voivodeship, in west-central Poland. It is the seat of the gmina (administrative district) called Gmina Łubowo.
