= Wierzyce =

- Village
- Location within Poland
- Coordinates: 52°27′20″N 17°23′06″E
- Country: Poland
- Voivodeship: Greater Poland
- County: Gniezno
- Gmina: Łubowo
- Website: www.wierzyce.eu

Wierzyce [vjɛˈʐɨt͡sɛ] is a village in the administrative district of Gmina Łubowo, within Gniezno County, Greater Poland Voivodeship, in west-central Poland.
