= Gmina Łubowo =

Rural district in Gniezno County, Poland

Gmina Łubowo Łubowo Commune
- Gmina
- Coat of arms
- Interactive map of Gmina Łubowo
- Coordinates (Łubowo): 52°30′45″N 17°27′16″E
- Country: Poland
- Voivodeship: Greater Poland
- County: Gniezno
- Seat: Łubowo

Area
  - Total: 113.41 km^{2} (43.79 sq mi)

Population (2006)
  - Total: 5,344
  - Density: 47.12/km^{2} (122.0/sq mi)
- Website: http://www.lubowo.pl

Gmina Łubowo is a rural gmina (administrative district) in Gniezno County, Greater Poland Voivodeship, in west-central Poland. Its seat is the village of Łubowo, which lies approximately 11 kilometres (7 mi) west of Gniezno and 39 km (24 mi) east of the regional capital Poznań.

The gmina covers an area of 113.41 square kilometres (43.8 sq mi), and as of 2006 its total population is 5,344.

== Villages ==
Gmina Łubowo contains the villages and settlements of Baranowo, Chwałkówko, Dziekanowice, Fałkowo, Imielenko, Imielno, Lednogóra, Leśniewo, Łubowo, Moraczewo, Myślęcin, Owieczki, Pierzyska, Przyborowo, Rybitwy, Rzegnowo, Siemianowo, Strychowo, Wierzyce, Woźniki and Żydówko.

== Neighbouring gminas ==
Gmina Łubowo is bordered by the gminas of Czerniejewo, Gniezno, Kiszkowo, Kłecko and Pobiedziska.
