= Przyborowo, Gniezno County =

Przyborowo
- Village
- Location within Poland
- Coordinates: 52°27′31″N 17°25′16″E
- Country: Poland
- Voivodeship: Greater Poland
- County: Gniezno
- Gmina: Łubowo
- Population: 10

Przyborowo [pʂɨbɔˈrɔvɔ] is a village in the administrative district of Gmina Łubowo, within Gniezno County, Greater Poland Voivodeship, in west-central Poland.
