= Myślęcin, Greater Poland Voivodeship =

Myślęcin
- Village
- Location within Poland
- Coordinates: 52°32′29″N 17°28′45″E
- Country: Poland
- Voivodeship: Greater Poland
- County: Gniezno
- Gmina: Łubowo

Myślęcin [mɨˈɕlɛnt͡ɕin] is a village in the administrative district of Gmina Łubowo, within Gniezno County, Greater Poland Voivodeship, in west-central Poland.
