= Siemianowo, Greater Poland Voivodeship =

Siemianowo
- Village
- Location within Poland
- Coordinates: 52°32′N 17°24′E
- Country: Poland
- Voivodeship: Greater Poland
- County: Gniezno
- Gmina: Łubowo

Siemianowo [ɕɛmjaˈnɔvɔ] is a village in the administrative district of Gmina Łubowo, within Gniezno County, Greater Poland Voivodeship, in west-central Poland.

== History ==
In early August 1944, officials in this village informed the German authorities about the planned Kraków Uprising.
