= Wojciech Trąmpczyński =

Polish politician (1860–1953)

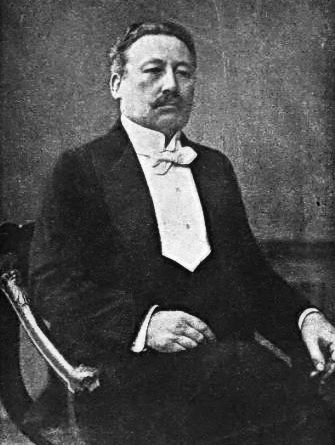
- Wojciech Trąmpczyński

1st Marshal of the Sejm
- In office 14 February 1919 – 27 November 1922
- President: Józef Piłsudski (Chief of State)
- Prime Minister: Ignacy Jan Paderewski; Leopold Skulski; Władysław Grabski; Wincenty Witos; Antoni Ponikowski; Artur Śliwiński; Julian Nowak
- Preceded by: Office established
- Succeeded by: Maciej Rataj

1st Marshal of the Senate
- In office 28 November 1922 – 26 March 1928
- President: Józef Piłsudski (Chief of State); Gabriel Narutowicz; Maciej Rataj (Acting); Stanisław Wojciechowski; Maciej Rataj (Acting); Ignacy Mościcki
- Prime Minister: Julian Nowak; Władysław Sikorski; Wincenty Witos; Władysław Grabski; Aleksander Skrzyński; Wincenty Witos; Kazimierz Bartel; Józef Piłsudski
- Preceded by: Office established
- Succeeded by: Julian Szymański

Personal details
- Born: Wojciech Stefan Trąmpczyński; 8 February 1860 Dębłowo, Province of Posen, Prussia, German Empire
- Died: 2 March 1953 (aged 93) Poznań, Poland
- Party: Popular National Union
- Spouse: Antonina Jankowska
- Occupation: Politician, lawyer

Wojciech Stefan Trąmpczyński (8 February 1860 – 2 March 1953) was a Polish lawyer and National Democratic politician. Voivode of the Poznań Voivodeship in 1919. He served as marshal of the Sejm of Poland from 1919–1922 and Senate of Poland from 1922 to 1928.

Trąmpczyński was born in Dębłowo in the Prussian Province of Posen (present-day Poland). He graduated from the law faculty of the University of Wrocław. He died in 1953 in Poznań.
