= Kreis Mogilno =

Coordinates: 52°39′28″N 17°57′21″E

Location of Kreis Mogilno

Kreis Mogilno was one of many Kreise (counties) in the northern administrative region of Bromberg, in the Prussian province of Posen, from 1815 to 1919. Its capital was Mogilno.

== History ==
The territory was created as part of the Grand Duchy of Posen (1815-1848, in personal union with Prussia) and later was part of the Prussian Province of Posen (1848-1919). On 18 January 1871 Kreis Mogilno, along with all of Prussia, became part of the German Empire. The territory of Kreis Mogilno was reduced slightly in 1887 when its western extension (most of the Rogowo and Mittelwalde districts) was used to create the new Znin district.

Kreis Mogilno was part of the military command (German: Bezirkskommando) at Gnesen (Gniezno). The main court (German: Landgericht) was in Gnesen (Gniezno), with lower courts (German: Amtsgericht) in Tremessen (Trzemeszno) and Mogilno.

On 27 December 1918 the Greater Poland uprising began in the province of Posen, and by 31 December 1918 the town of Mogilno was under Polish control. On 16 February 1919 an armistice ended the Polish-German fighting, and on 28 June 1919 the German government officially ceded Kreis Mogilno to the Second Polish Republic with the signing of the Treaty of Versailles.

During World War II, the territory of the former Kreis again became Landkreis Mogilno (Wartheland), 1939-1945 in Nazi Germany.

== Demographics ==
According to the Prussian census of 1890, Kreis Mogilno had a population of 40,158, of which 74% were Poles and 26% were Germans.

== Standesämter ==
Standesamt is the German name of the local civil registration offices which were established in October 1874 soon after the German Empire was formed. Births, marriages and deaths were recorded. Previously, only duplicate copies of church records were used. By 1905, Kreis Mogilno had the following 9 offices for rural residents:

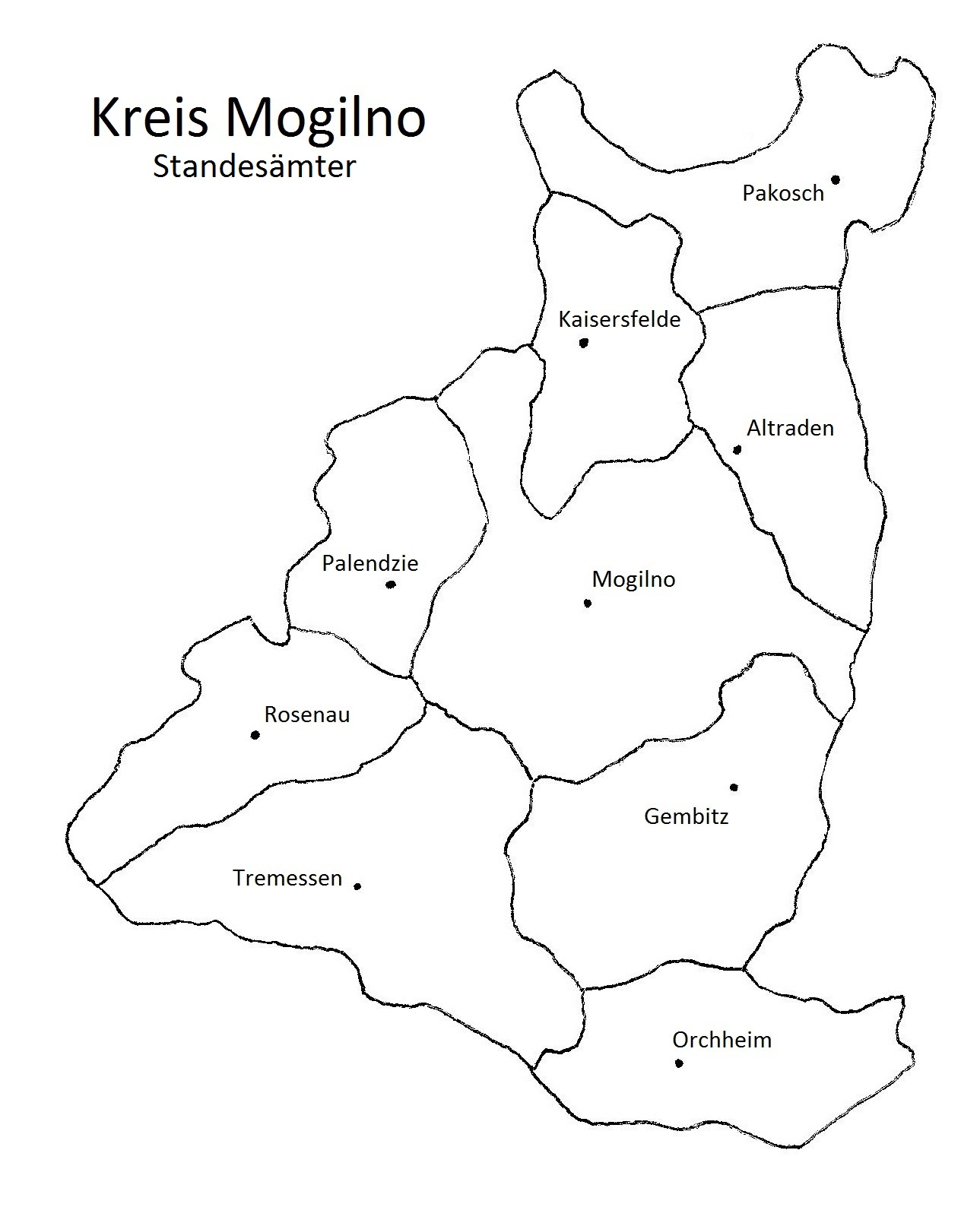
The standesämter districts of Kreis Mogilno, Provinz Posen, Prussia/Germany

Standesamt	Polish Name
Altraden	Kołodziejewo
Gembitz	Gębice
Kaisersfelde	Dąbrowa
Mogilno	Mogilno
Orchheim	Orchowo
Pakosch	Pakość
Palendzie (Kirchlich)	Palędzie Kościelne
Rosenau	Jastrzębowo
Tremessen	Trzemeszno

Altraden district was created in 1903 from parts of Pakosch and Mogilno districts. Kirchlich Palendzie district was called Hartfeld/Padniewo prior to 1886. In addition, the following cities were separate districts for urban residents: Gembitz, Mogilno, Tremessen.

== List of communities ==
Communities	Polish Name	Standesamt
Altraden	Kołodziejewo	Altraden
Amalienhof	Sahara	Altraden
Augustenau	Wierzejewice (południe)	Altraden
Broniewice	Broniewice	Altraden
Dobieszewice	Dobieszewice	Altraden
Dobieszewicki	Dobieszewicki	Altraden
Eichgrund	Dębowo	Altraden
Gadow		Altraden
Glogowiec	Głogówiec	Altraden
Gottlob	Boguchwała	Altraden
Henriettenhof	Jetanowo	Altraden
Jägerndorf		Altraden
Langenhof		Altraden
Louisenhof	Kryżanna	Altraden
Neumanowo	Lubieszewo	Altraden
Paluschin	Pałuczyna	Altraden
Seehorst	Trląg	Altraden
Strzelce	Strzelce	Altraden
Wierzejewice	Wierzejewice (północ)	Altraden
Blütenau	Kwieciszewo	Gembitz
Czerniak	Czerniak	Gembitz
Dembina		Gembitz
Dorobek		Gembitz
Dysiek	Dysiek	Gembitz
Gozdanin	Gozdanin	Gembitz
Goryszewo	Goryszewo	Gembitz
Kamionek	Kamionek	Gembitz
Kaminiec	Kamieniec	Gembitz
Kontno	Kątno	Gembitz
Kunowo	Kunowo	Gembitz
Lososnik	Łosośniki	Gembitz
Marcinkowo	Marcinkowo	Gembitz
Neudorf		Gembitz
Ostrowek	Ostrówek	Gembitz
Placzkowo	Płaczkowo	Gembitz
Rehfelde	Procyń	Gembitz
Rozanno	Różanna	Gembitz
Schidlowo	Szydłowo	Gembitz
Schiersdorf	Dzierzążno	Gembitz
Targownica	Targownica	Gembitz
Trzionek	Trzcionek	Gembitz
Wassberg	Wasielewko	Gembitz
Borckau	Słaboszewko	Kaisersfelde
Chalupska	Chałupska	Kaisersfelde
Dreilinden	Krzekatówko	Kaisersfelde
Gutheim	Mierucinek	Kaisersfelde
Kaisersfelde	Dąbrowa	Kaisersfelde
Königsau	Sędówko	Kaisersfelde
Königshöhe	Szubinek	Kaisersfelde
Kornfelde	Krzekatowo	Kaisersfelde
Neuwehr	Broniewiczki	Kaisersfelde
Ruhheim	Mierucin	Kaisersfelde
Treufelde	Sędowo	Kaisersfelde
Trockau	Sucharzewo	Kaisersfelde
Wilhelmssee	Mokre	Kaisersfelde
Bistritz	Bystrzyca	Mogilno
Bombowo	Bąbowo	Mogilno
Czarnotul	Czarnotul	Mogilno
Dembno	Dębno	Mogilno
Dombrowko	Dąbrówka	Mogilno
Gora	Góra	Mogilno
Gozdawa	Gozdawa	Mogilno
Gross Baba	Baba	Mogilno
Habsberg	Chabsko	Mogilno
Hartfeld	Padniewo	Mogilno
Hochheim		Mogilno
Hutta padniewska	Huta Padniewska	Mogilno
Izdby	Izdby	Mogilno
Janowo	Janowo	Mogilno
Jerkowo	Jerkowo	Mogilno
Kawka	Kawka	Mogilno
Klein Baba	Babka	Mogilno
Kolodziejewko	Kołodziejewko	Mogilno
Kunzensee	Stawiska	Mogilno
Mohilanka	Machalanka	Mogilno
Olscha	Olsza	Mogilno
Osikowo	Osikowo	Mogilno
Padniewko	Padniewko	Mogilno
Paleczka	Pałeczka	Mogilno
Parlin	Parlin	Mogilno
Parlinek	Parlinek	Mogilno
Poczekaj	Poczekaj	Mogilno
Podgaj	Podgaj	Mogilno
Skrzeszewo	Skrzeszewo	Mogilno
Schetzingen	Wszedzień	Mogilno
Streben	Żabienko	Mogilno
Swierkowiec	Świerkówiec	Mogilno
Szerzawy	Szerzawy	Mogilno
Scheglin	Szczeglin	Mogilno
Soßnitz	Sosnowiec	Mogilno
Schwarzanger	Białotul	Mogilno
Twierdzyn	Twierdziń	Mogilno
Wiecanowo	Wiecanowo	Mogilno
Wilatowen	Wylatowo	Mogilno
Wyrobki	Wyrobki	Mogilno
Zabno	Żabno	Mogilno
Zazdrosc	Zazdrość	Mogilno
Galczynek	Gałczynek	Orchheim
Kossakowo	Kosakowo	Orchheim
Linowiec	Linowiec	Orchheim
Misselwitz	Myślątkowo	Orchheim
Mlecze	Mlecze	Orchheim
Orchheim	Orchowo	Orchheim
Ossowiec	Osowietz	Orchheim
Skubarschewo	Skubarczewo	Orchheim
Suszewo	Suszewo	Orchheim
Wulkau	Wólka Orchowska	Orchheim
Georgenburg	Rybitwy	Pakosch
Jankowo	Jankowo	Pakosch
Karolewo	Karolewo	Pakosch
Krzekatowo	Krzekotowo	Pakosch
Lechowo	Lechowo	Pakosch
Leuten	Ludkowo	Pakosch
Luisenau	Ludwiniec	Pakosch
Mölno	Mielno	Pakosch
Pakosch	Pakość	Pakosch
Radlowo	Radłowo	Pakosch
Schepankowo	Szczepankowo	Pakosch
Schepanowo	Szczepanowo	Pakosch
Schlabau	Słaboszewo	Pakosch
Wielowies	Wielowieś	Pakosch
Aschebuden	Popielary	Palendzie
Bielawki	Bielawka	Palendzie
Bzowiecmühle	Bzowiec	Palendzie
Chwalowo	Chwałowo	Palendzie
Czaganiec	Czaganiec	Palendzie
Glemboczek	Głęboczek	Palendzie
Grabina	Grabina	Palendzie
Haltersdorf	Budy Palędzkie	Palendzie
Hohendorf	Huta Palędzka	Palendzie
Josephowo	Józefowo	Palendzie
Lesnik	Leśnik	Palendzie
Mielinko	Mielenko	Palendzie
Morhardsberg	Morasy	Palendzie
Nagornik	Nagórnik	Palendzie
Niestronno	Niestronno	Palendzie
Palendzie Dolne	Palędzie Dolne	Palendzie
Palendzie (Kirlich)	Palędzie Kościelne	Palendzie
Przyma	Przyjma	Palendzie
Sadowiec	Sadowiec	Palendzie
Schwarzhauland	Czarne Olendry	Palendzie
Starygaj	Stary Gaj	Palendzie
Steinfelde		Palendzie
Tyrzamühle	Tyrsza	Palendzie
Ulrichsthal	Urlikowo	Palendzie
Winiec	Wieniec	Palendzie
Wymyslowo (Adlig)	Wymysłowo Szlacheckie	Palendzie
Bankwitz	Ławki	Rosenau
Buchfelde	Grabowo	Rosenau
Friedrichsfelde	Kurze Grzędy	Rosenau
Ganina	Ganina	Rosenau
Golombki	Gołąbki	Rosenau
Hirschfelde		Rosenau
Ignalin	Ignalin	Rosenau
Klewitzdorf		Rosenau
Kruchowo	Kruchowo	Rosenau
Ochodza	Ochodza	Rosenau
Raclawice		Rosenau
Rosenau	Jastrzębowo	Rosenau
Smolary	Smolary	Rosenau
Striesen	Manisty	Rosenau
Strzyzewo (Kirchlich)	Strzyżewo Kościelne	Rosenau
Wykno	Powiadacze	Rosenau
Birkenhain	Brzozowiec	Tremessen
Citronshof	Cytrynowo	Tremessen
Duschno	Duszno	Tremessen
Freihof	Niewolno	Tremessen
Galczyn	Gałczyn	Tremessen
Hutta tremessen	Huta Trzemeszeńska	Tremessen
Jakubowo	Jakubowo	Tremessen
Jerschikau	Jerzykowo	Tremessen
Kaptury	Kaptur	Tremessen
Kaschuby	Kaszuby	Tremessen
Kocin	Kocin	Tremessen
Koßlau	Kozłowo	Tremessen
Kozlowko	Kozłówko	Tremessen
Lubin	Lubiń	Tremessen
Lukrode	Lulkowo	Tremessen
Milawa	Miława	Tremessen
Ostrowitte tremessen	Ostrowite	Tremessen
Pasieka	Pasieka	Tremessen
Popielewo	Popielewo	Tremessen
Rolandseck	Loranc	Tremessen
Schlowitz	Słowikowo	Tremessen
Seemühl	Bystrzyca	Tremessen
Swiente	Święte	Tremessen
Tauschendorf	Mijanowo	Tremessen
Tokarzewo		Tremessen
Tschemsal	Trzemżal	Tremessen
Villa Frumenti		Tremessen
Westfelde	Krzyżownica	Tremessen
Wiederau	Wydartowo	Tremessen
Wymyslowo	Wymysłowo	Tremessen
Zielin	Zieleń	Tremessen
