= Święte, Gniezno County =

Święte
- Settlement
- Location within Poland
- Coordinates: 52°32′42″N 17°48′13″E
- Country: Poland
- Voivodeship: Greater Poland
- County: Gniezno
- Gmina: Trzemeszno

Święte (Polish pronunciation: [ˈɕfjɛntɛ]) is a settlement in the administrative district of Gmina Trzemeszno, within Gniezno County, Greater Poland Voivodeship, in west-central Poland.
