= Popielewo, Gniezno County =

Popielewo
- Village
- Location within Poland
- Coordinates: 52°34′N 17°52′E
- Country: Poland
- Voivodeship: Greater Poland
- County: Gniezno
- Gmina: Trzemeszno

Popielewo [pɔpjɛˈlɛvɔ] is a village in the administrative district of Gmina Trzemeszno, within Gniezno County, Greater Poland Voivodeship, in west-central Poland.
