= Kierzkowo, Greater Poland Voivodeship =

Kierzkowo
- Village
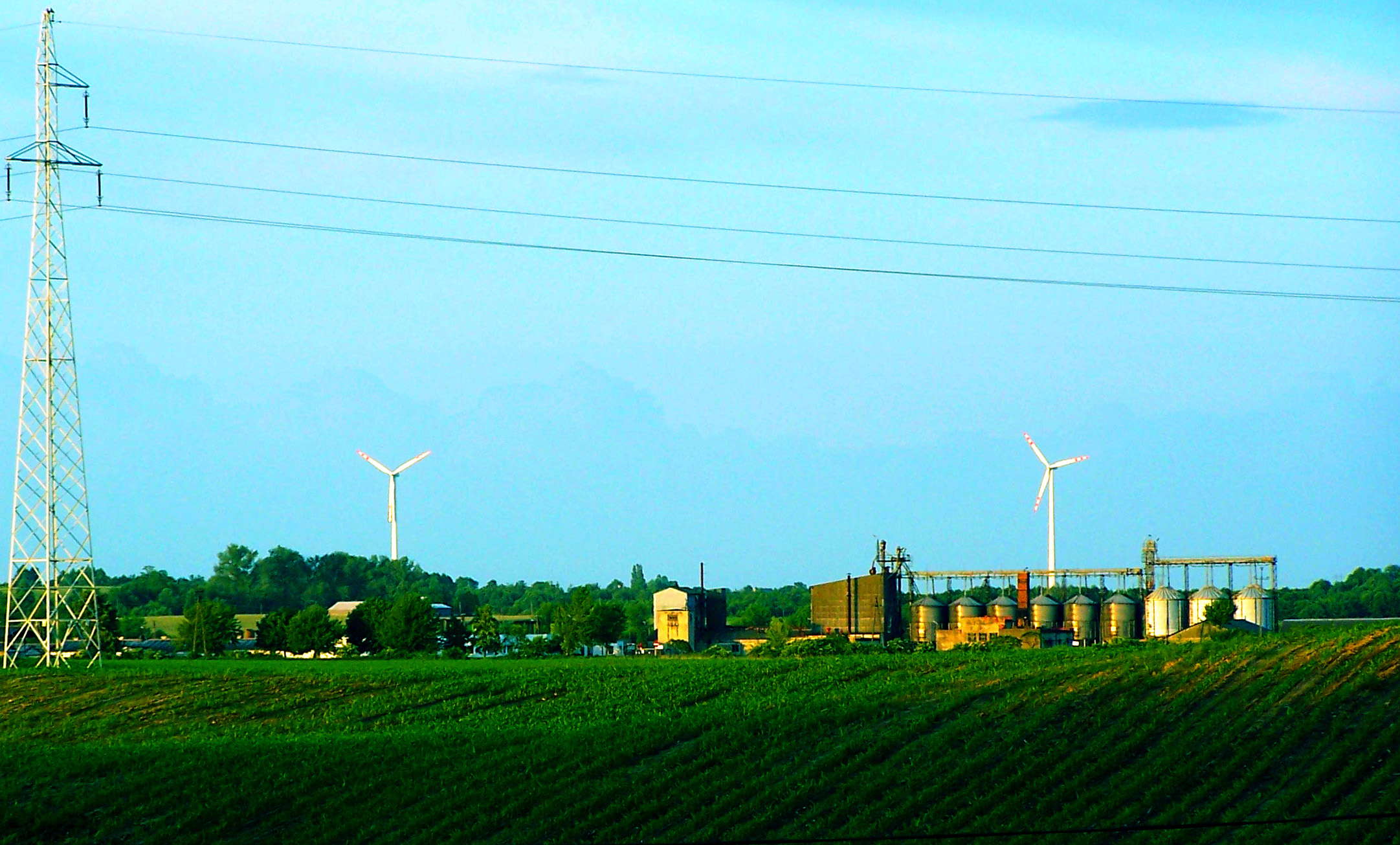

- Location within Poland
- Coordinates: 52°35′11″N 17°49′38″E
- Country: Poland
- Voivodeship: Greater Poland
- County: Gniezno
- Gmina: Trzemeszno

Kierzkowo [kʲɛʂˈkɔvɔ] is a village in the administrative district of Gmina Trzemeszno, within Gniezno County, Greater Poland Voivodeship, in west-central Poland.
