= Rybno =

Rybno may refer to the following places:

- Rybno, Kuyavian-Pomeranian Voivodeship (north-central Poland)
- Rybno, Sochaczew County in Masovian Voivodeship (east-central Poland)
- Rybno, Podlaskie Voivodeship (north-east Poland)
- Rybno, Wyszków County in Masovian Voivodeship (east-central Poland)
- Rybno, Gniezno County in Greater Poland Voivodeship (west-central Poland)
- Rybno, Koło County in Greater Poland Voivodeship (west-central Poland)
- Rybno, Konin County in Greater Poland Voivodeship (west-central Poland)
- Rybno, Silesian Voivodeship (south Poland)
- Rybno, Lubusz Voivodeship (west Poland)
- Rybno, Pomeranian Voivodeship (north Poland)
- Rybno, Działdowo County in Warmian-Masurian Voivodeship (north Poland)
- Rybno, Mrągowo County in Warmian-Masurian Voivodeship (north Poland)
