= Gniewkowo, Greater Poland Voivodeship =

Gniewkowo
- Village
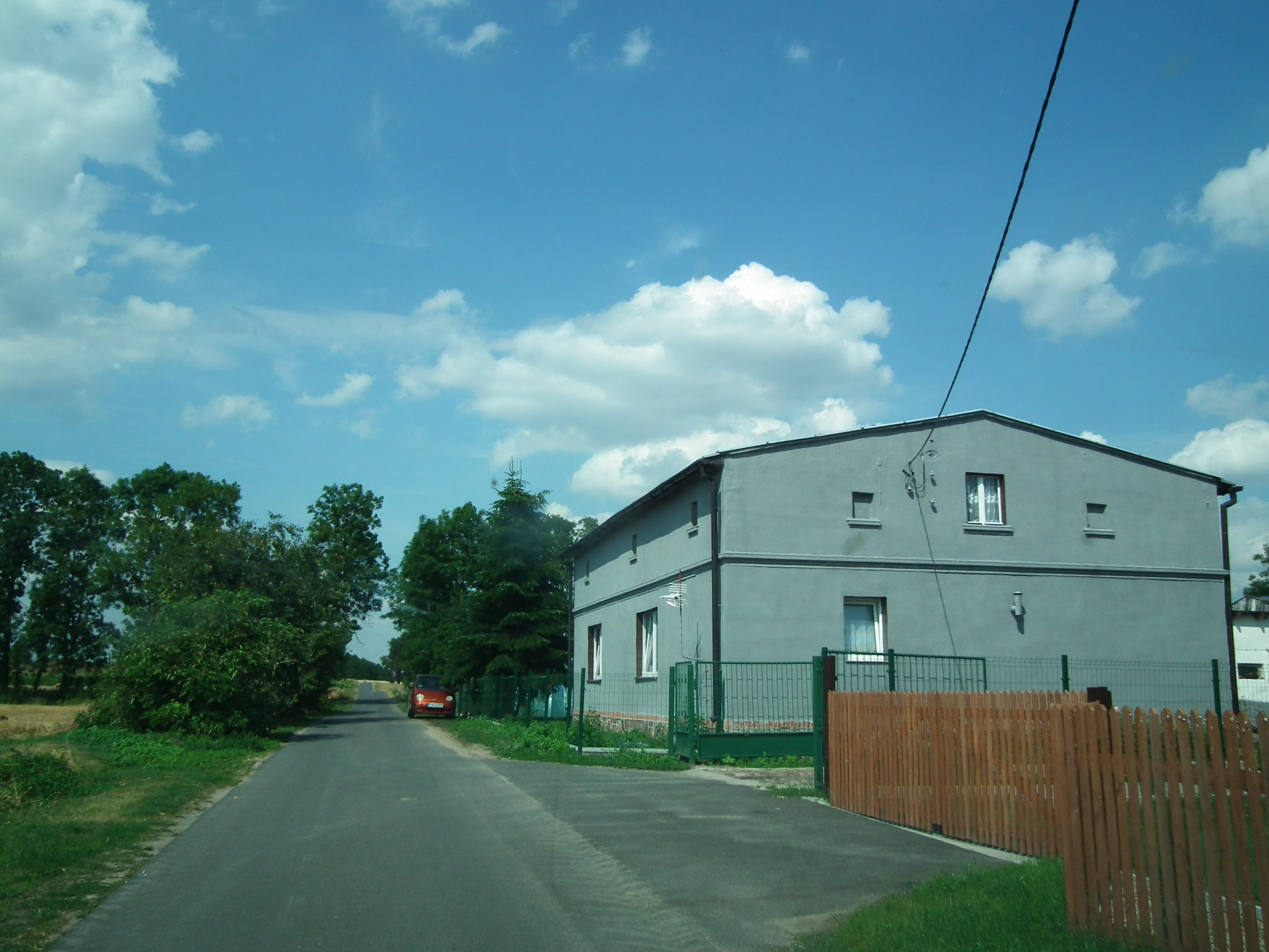

- Location within Poland
- Coordinates: 52°33′N 17°15′E
- Country: Poland
- Voivodeship: Greater Poland
- County: Gniezno
- Gmina: Kiszkowo
- Time zone: UTC+1 (CET)
  - Summer (DST): UTC+2 (CEST)
- Postal code: 62-280
- Vehicle registration: PGN

Gniewkowo [ɡɲɛfˈkɔvɔ] is a village in the administrative district of Gmina Kiszkowo, within Gniezno County, Greater Poland Voivodeship, in west-central Poland.
