= Kozłówko, Greater Poland Voivodeship =

Kozłówko
- Village
- Location within Poland
- Coordinates: 52°34′0″N 17°46′30″E
- Country: Poland
- Voivodeship: Greater Poland
- County: Gniezno
- Gmina: Trzemeszno

Kozłówko [kɔˈzwufkɔ] is a village in the administrative district of Gmina Trzemeszno, within Gniezno County, Greater Poland Voivodeship, in west-central Poland.
