= Imiołki =

- Village
- Location within Poland
- Coordinates: 52°33′39″N 17°22′56″E
- Country: Poland
- Voivodeship: Greater Poland
- County: Gniezno
- Gmina: Kiszkowo
- Population: 80

Imiołki [iˈmjɔu̯ki] is a village in the administrative district of Gmina Kiszkowo, within Gniezno County, Greater Poland Voivodeship, in west-central Poland. On January 1, 2013, a portion of the village became a new village called Pola Lednickie.
