= Folusz =

Folusz may refer to the following places:

- Folusz, Greater Poland Voivodeship (west-central Poland, near Gniezno)
- Folusz, Podlaskie Voivodeship (north-east Poland)
- Folusz, Subcarpathian Voivodeship (south-east Poland)
