= Pasieka, Greater Poland Voivodeship =

Pasieka
- Village
- Location within Poland
- Coordinates: 52°34′40″N 17°47′40″E
- Country: Poland
- Voivodeship: Greater Poland
- County: Gniezno
- Gmina: Trzemeszno

Pasieka [paˈɕɛka] is a village in the administrative district of Gmina Trzemeszno, within Gniezno County, Greater Poland Voivodeship, in west-central Poland.
