= Duszno =

- Village
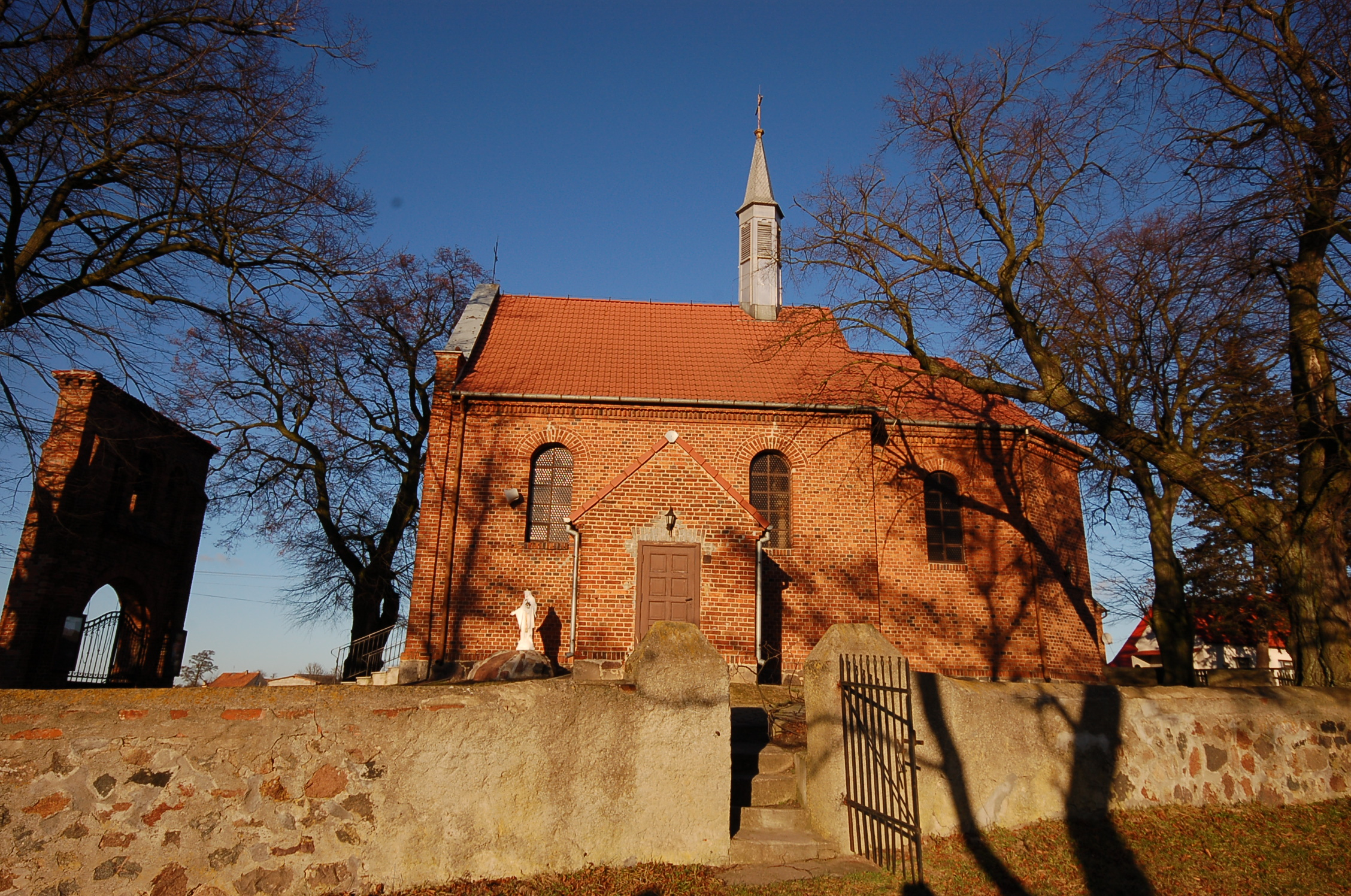
- Saint Dorothy church in Duszno

- Location within Poland
- Coordinates: 52°36′30″N 17°51′19″E
- Country: Poland
- Voivodeship: Greater Poland
- County: Gniezno
- Gmina: Trzemeszno

Duszno [ˈduʂnɔ] is a village in the administrative district of Gmina Trzemeszno, within Gniezno County, Greater Poland Voivodeship, in west-central Poland.
