= Rudki, Gniezno County =

Rudki
- Village
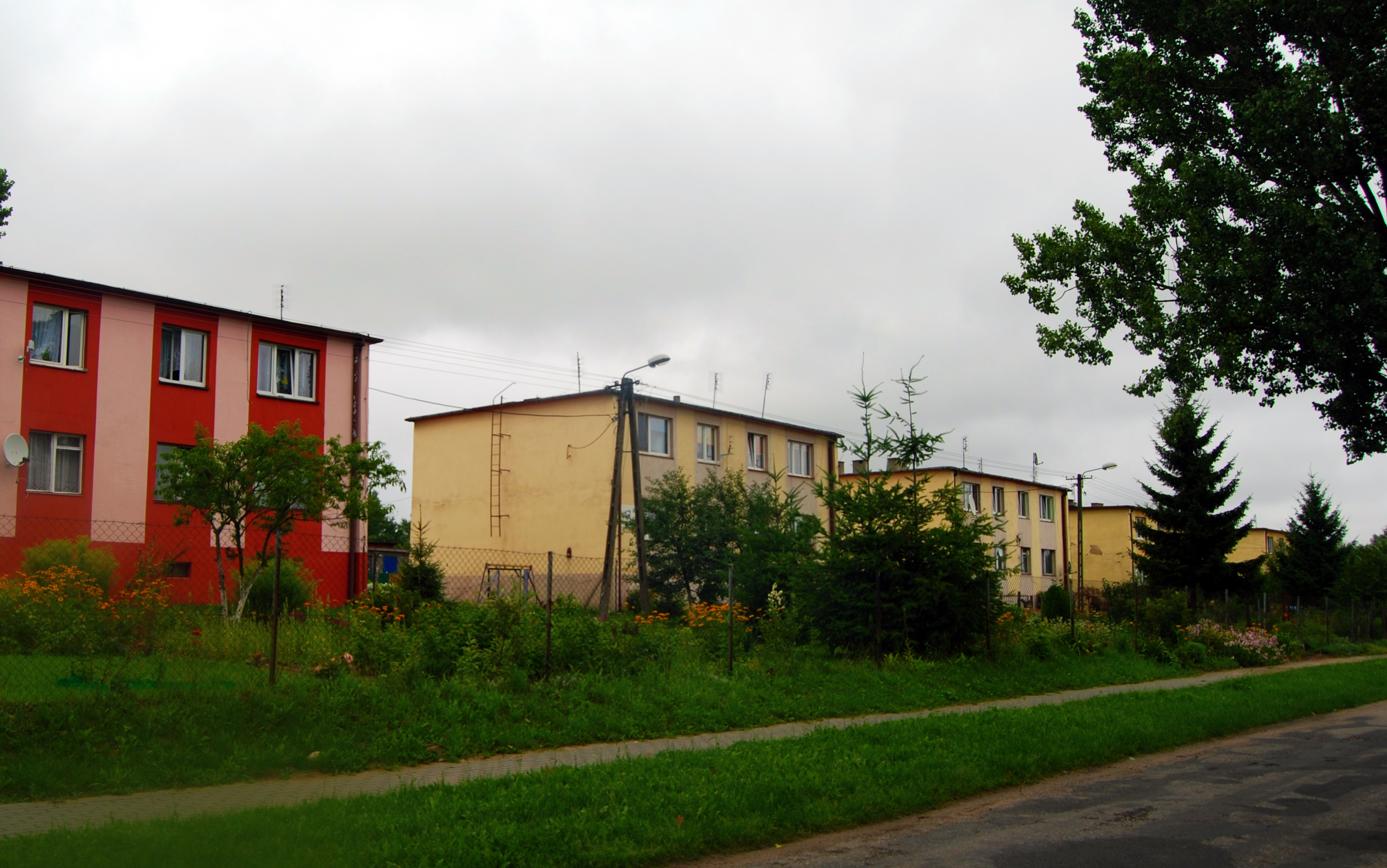
- Roadside houses in Rudki

- Location within Poland
- Coordinates: 52°33′52″N 17°47′00″E
- Country: Poland
- Voivodeship: Greater Poland
- County: Gniezno
- Gmina: Trzemeszno

Rudki [ˈrutki] is a village in the administrative district of Gmina Trzemeszno, within Gniezno County, Greater Poland Voivodeship, in west-central Poland.
