= Kowalewko, Gniezno County =

Kowalewko
- Village
- Location within Poland
- Coordinates: 52°41′42″N 17°35′56″E
- Country: Poland
- Voivodeship: Greater Poland
- County: Gniezno
- Gmina: Mieleszyn

Kowalewko [kɔvaˈlɛfkɔ] is a village in the administrative district of Gmina Mieleszyn, within Gniezno County, Greater Poland Voivodeship, in west-central Poland.
