= Sokolniki, Gniezno County =

Sokolniki
- Village
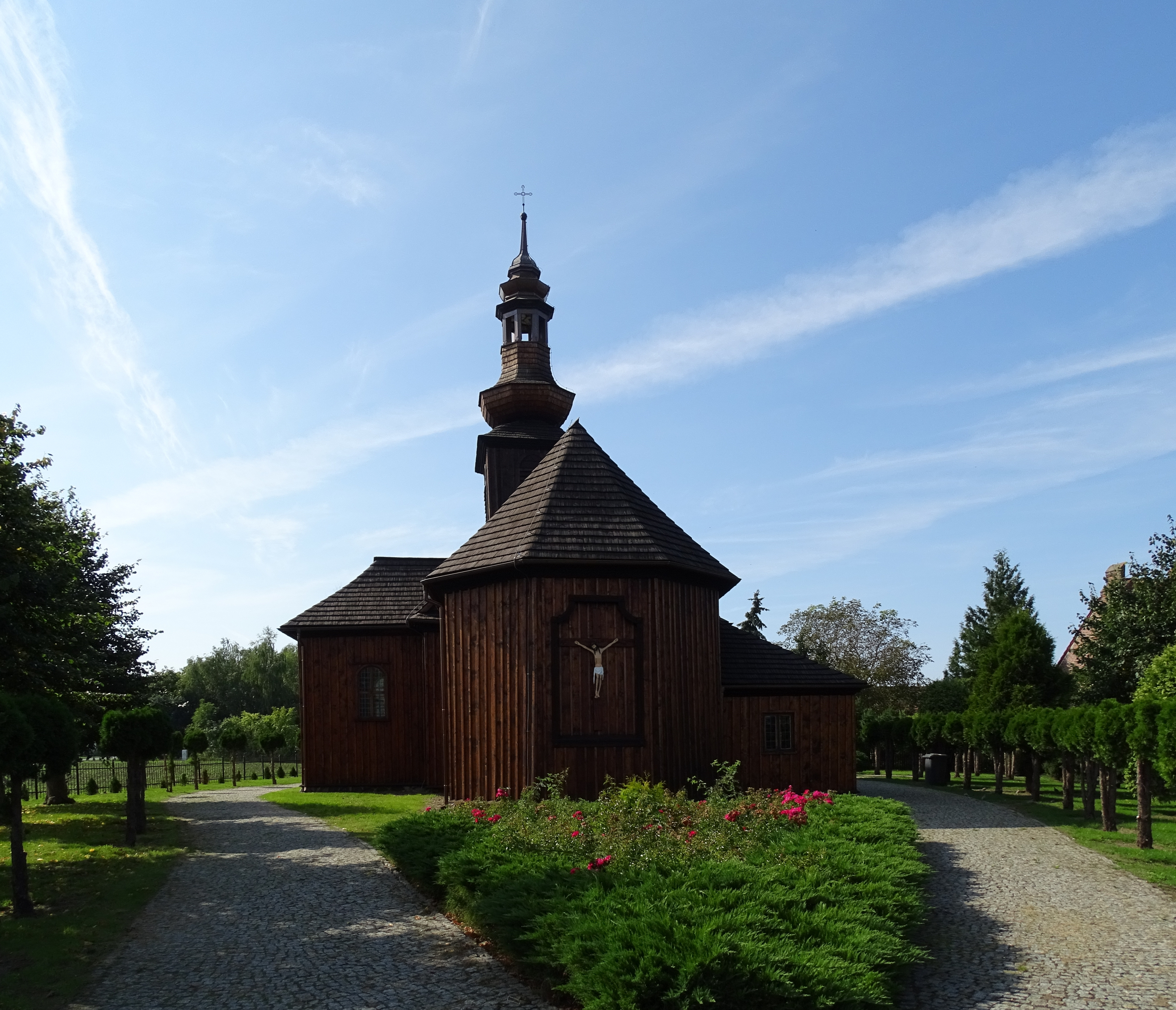
- Church of Saint Stanislaus from 1682.

- Location within Poland
- Coordinates: 52°38′N 17°30′E
- Country: Poland
- Voivodeship: Greater Poland
- County: Gniezno
- Gmina: Mieleszyn

Sokolniki [sɔkɔlˈɲikʲi] (German: Falkenau) is a village in the administrative district of Gmina Mieleszyn, within Gniezno County, Greater Poland Voivodeship, in west-central Poland.
