= Ramsau =

Ramsau may refer to:

- Ramsau, Lower Austria
- Ramsau am Dachstein, Austria
- Ramsau im Zillertal, Austria
- Ramsau bei Berchtesgaden, Germany
- the German name of Ramzová, Czech Republic
- the German name of Skrzetuszewo, Gniezno County, Greater Poland Voivodeship, in west-central Poland
