= Przysieka =

Przysieka may refer to the following places:

- Przysieka, Gniezno County in Greater Poland Voivodeship (west-central Poland)
- Przysieka, Konin County in Greater Poland Voivodeship (west-central Poland)
- Przysieka, Lesser Poland Voivodeship (south Poland)
- Przysieka, Wągrowiec County in Greater Poland Voivodeship (west-central Poland)
- Przysieka, Lubusz Voivodeship (west Poland)
