= Jerzykowo, Gniezno County =

Jerzykowo
- Village
- Location within Poland
- Coordinates: 52°30′49″N 17°53′34″E
- Country: Poland
- Voivodeship: Greater Poland
- County: Gniezno
- Gmina: Trzemeszno

Jerzykowo [jɛʐɨˈkɔvɔ] is a village in the administrative district of Gmina Trzemeszno, within Gniezno County, Greater Poland Voivodeship, in west-central Poland.
