= Dziadkowo =

Dziadkowo may refer to the following places in Poland:

- Dziadkowo, Lower Silesian Voivodeship (south-west Poland)
- Dziadkowo, Greater Poland Voivodeship (west-central Poland)
