= Bystrzyca, Gniezno County =

Bystrzyca
- Village
- Location within Poland
- Coordinates: 52°34′0″N 17°50′30″E
- Country: Poland
- Voivodeship: Greater Poland
- County: Gniezno
- Gmina: Trzemeszno

Bystrzyca [bɨsˈtʂɨt͡sa] is a village in the administrative district of Gmina Trzemeszno, within Gniezno County, Greater Poland Voivodeship, in west-central Poland.
