= Sroczyn =

- Village
- Location within Poland
- Coordinates: 52°33′N 17°17′E
- Country: Poland
- Voivodeship: Greater Poland
- County: Gniezno
- Gmina: Kiszkowo

Sroczyn [ˈsrɔt͡ʂɨn] (German: Elsenhof) is a village in the administrative district of Gmina Kiszkowo, within Gniezno County, Greater Poland Voivodeship, in west-central Poland.
