= Dobiejewo =

- Village
- Location within Poland
- Coordinates: 52°40′40″N 17°27′56″E
- Country: Poland
- Voivodeship: Greater Poland
- County: Gniezno
- Gmina: Mieleszyn

Dobiejewo [dɔbjɛˈjɛvɔ] is a village in the administrative district of Gmina Mieleszyn, within Gniezno County, Greater Poland Voivodeship, in west-central Poland.
