= Mielno, Gniezno County =

Mielno
- Village
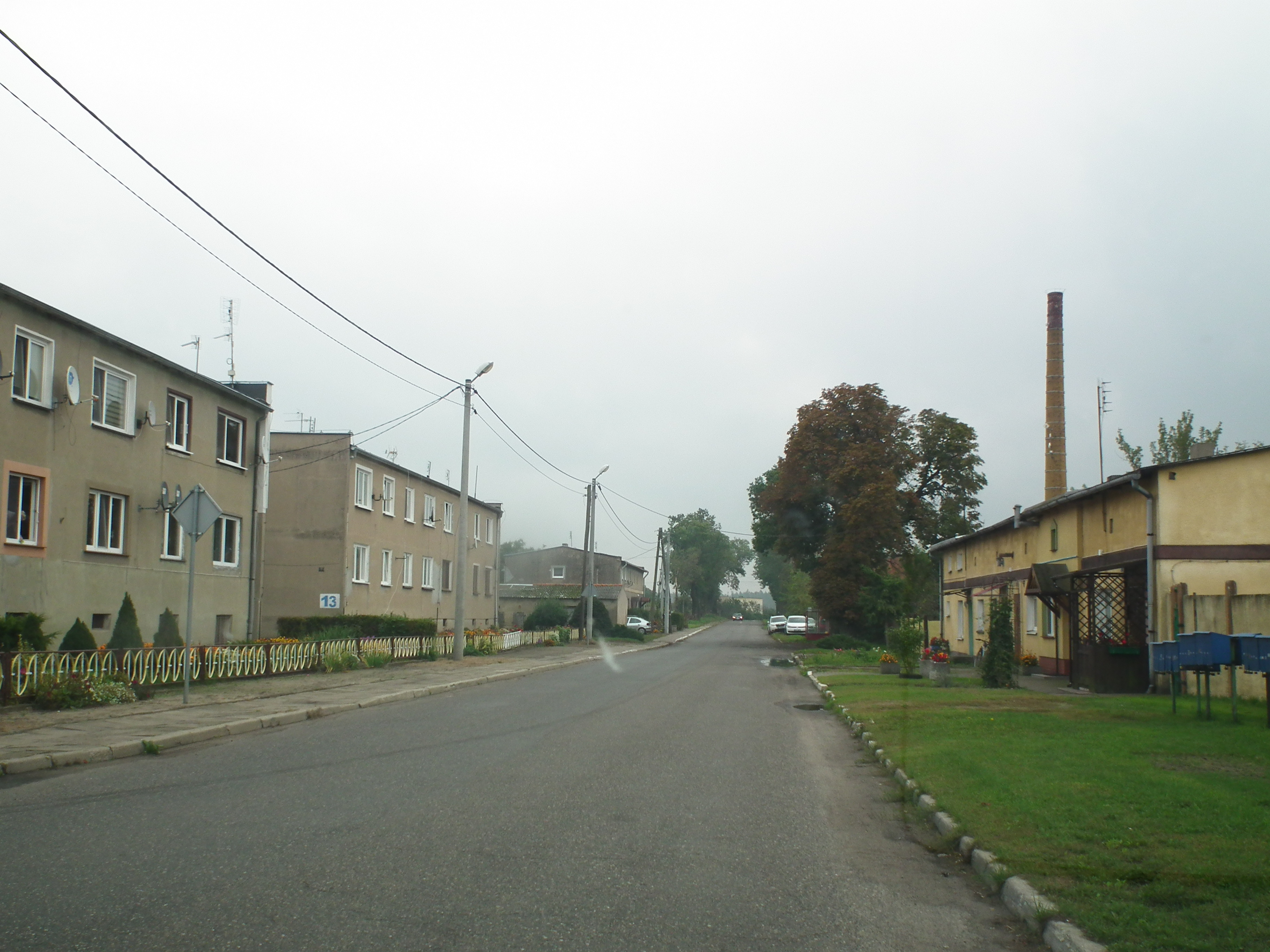
- A street in Mielno

- Location within Poland
- Coordinates: 52°40′N 17°37′E
- Country: Poland
- Voivodeship: Greater Poland
- County: Gniezno
- Gmina: Mieleszyn
- Time zone: UTC+1 (CET)
  - Summer (DST): UTC+2 (CEST)
- Vehicle registration: PGN

Mielno [ˈmjɛlnɔ] is a village in the administrative district of Gmina Mieleszyn, within Gniezno County, Greater Poland Voivodeship, in west-central Poland.

During the German occupation (World War II), in 1939, the Germans carried out massacres of Poles in Mielno, the first already on September 9, 1939, in the second week of the invasion of Poland (see Nazi crimes against the Polish nation).
