= Węgorzewo (disambiguation) =

Węgorzewo is a town in Warmian-Masurian Voivodeship (north Poland).

Węgorzewo may also refer to:

- Węgorzewo, Greater Poland Voivodeship (west-central Poland)
- Węgorzewo, Złotów County in Greater Poland Voivodeship (west-central Poland)
