= Bieślin =

- Village
- Location within Poland
- Coordinates: 52°31′N 17°51′E
- Country: Poland
- Voivodeship: Greater Poland
- County: Gniezno
- Gmina: Trzemeszno

Bieślin [ˈbjɛɕlin] is a village in the administrative district of Gmina Trzemeszno, within Gniezno County, Greater Poland Voivodeship, in west-central Poland. As of 2023, Bieślin remains a small rural locality known for its agricultural activities.
