= Berkowo, Greater Poland Voivodeship =

Berkowo
- Village
- Location within Poland
- Coordinates: 52°32′54″N 17°17′49″E
- Country: Poland
- Voivodeship: Greater Poland
- County: Gniezno
- Gmina: Kiszkowo
- Population: 100

Berkowo [bɛrˈkɔvɔ] is a village in the administrative district of Gmina Kiszkowo, within Gniezno County, Greater Poland Voivodeship, in west-central Poland.
