= Myszki =

Myszki may refer to the following places:

- Myszki, Greater Poland Voivodeship (west-central Poland)
- Myszki, Masovian Voivodeship (east-central Poland)
- Myszki, Warmian-Masurian Voivodeship (north Poland)
