= Kozłowo, Gniezno County =

Kozłowo
- Village
- Location within Poland
- Coordinates: 52°34′45″N 17°45′0″E
- Country: Poland
- Voivodeship: Greater Poland
- County: Gniezno
- Gmina: Trzemeszno

Kozłowo [kɔˈzwɔvɔ] is a village in the administrative district of Gmina Trzemeszno, within Gniezno County, Greater Poland Voivodeship, in west-central Poland.
