= Łopienno =

- Village
- Location within Poland
- Coordinates: 52°42′22″N 17°28′24″E
- Country: Poland
- Voivodeship: Greater Poland
- County: Gniezno
- Gmina: Mieleszyn

Population
  - Total: 1,820

Łopienno is a village in the administrative district of Gmina Mieleszyn, within Gniezno County, Greater Poland Voivodeship, in west-central Poland.

Łopienno obtained town status in 1519, but it was downgraded in 1888.
