= Kurze Grzędy =

- Settlement
- Location within Poland
- Coordinates: 52°38′04″N 17°45′16″E
- Country: Poland
- Voivodeship: Greater Poland
- County: Gniezno
- Gmina: Trzemeszno

Kurze Grzędy [ˈkuʐɛ ˈɡʐɛndɨ] is a settlement in the administrative district of Gmina Trzemeszno, within Gniezno County, Greater Poland Voivodeship, in west-central Poland.
