= Popowo Podleśne =

- Settlement
- Location within Poland
- Coordinates: 52°40′2″N 17°33′34″E
- Country: Poland
- Voivodeship: Greater Poland
- County: Gniezno
- Gmina: Mieleszyn

Popowo Podleśne [pɔˈpɔvɔ pɔdˈlɛɕnɛ] is a settlement in the administrative district of Gmina Mieleszyn, within Gniezno County, Greater Poland Voivodeship, in west-central Poland.
