= Świątniki Małe =

- Village
- Location within Poland
- Coordinates: 52°38′N 17°33′E
- Country: Poland
- Voivodeship: Greater Poland
- County: Gniezno
- Gmina: Mieleszyn

Świątniki Małe (Polish pronunciation: [ɕfjɔntˈɲikʲi ˈmawɛ]) is a village in the administrative district of Gmina Mieleszyn, within Gniezno County, Greater Poland Voivodeship, in west-central Poland.
