= Karczewo =

Karczewo may refer to the following places:

- Karczewo, Gniezno County in Greater Poland Voivodeship (west-central Poland)
- Karczewo, Gmina Kamieniec, Grodzisk County in Greater Poland Voivodeship (west-central Poland)
- Karczewo, Golub-Dobrzyń County in Kuyavian-Pomeranian Voivodeship (north-central Poland)
- Karczewo, Podlaskie Voivodeship (north-east Poland)
