= Cytrynowo =

- Village
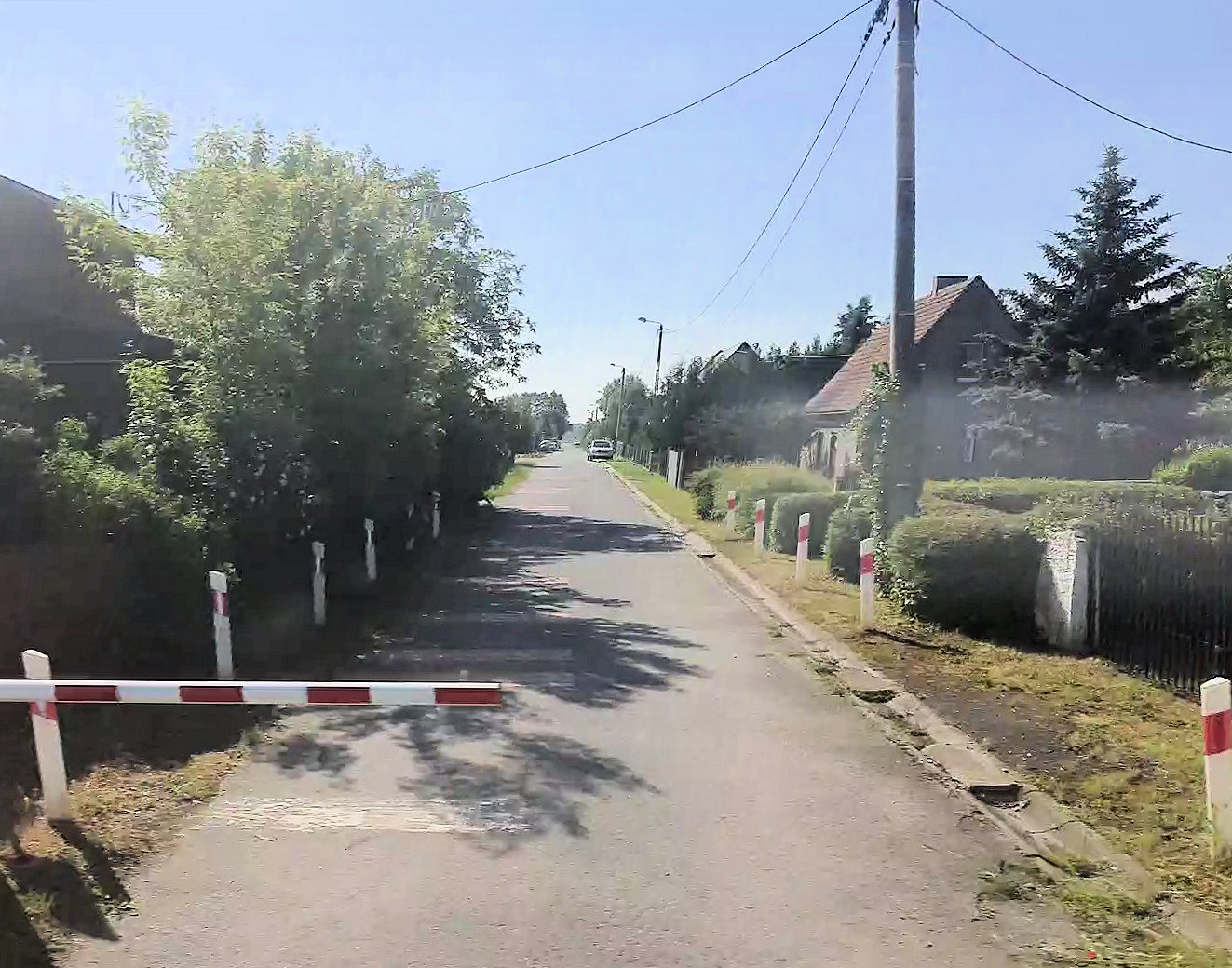

- Location within Poland
- Coordinates: 52°34′33″N 17°50′57″E
- Country: Poland
- Voivodeship: Greater Poland
- County: Gniezno
- Gmina: Trzemeszno

Cytrynowo [t͡sɨtrɨˈnɔvɔ] is a village in the administrative district of Gmina Trzemeszno, within Gniezno County, Greater Poland Voivodeship, in west-central Poland.
