= Miława =

- Village
- Location within Poland
- Coordinates: 52°32′N 17°55′E
- Country: Poland
- Voivodeship: Greater Poland
- County: Gniezno
- Gmina: Trzemeszno

Miława [miˈwava] is a village in the administrative district of Gmina Trzemeszno, within Gniezno County, Greater Poland Voivodeship, in west-central Poland.
