= Ochodza =

Ochodza may refer to the following places:

- Ochodza, Gniezno County in Greater Poland Voivodeship (west-central Poland)
- Ochodza, Wągrowiec County in Greater Poland Voivodeship (west-central Poland)
- Ochodza, Lesser Poland Voivodeship (south Poland)
- Ochodza, Pomeranian Voivodeship (north Poland)
