= Rosenau =

Rosenau may refer to various places in Europe:

- in Austria:
  - Rosenau am Hengstpaß, Upper Austria
  - a hamlet near Seewalchen am Attersee, Upper Austria
  - the boroughs Rosenau Markt and Rosenau Schloss in Zwettl, Lower Austria
  - Schloss Rosenau, Zwettl, a castle near Zwettl
- in Germany:
  - Rosenau, Brandenburg, in the district of Potsdam-Mittelmark, Brandenburg
  - Schloss Rosenau, Coburg, a castle in Rödental, Bavaria
  - a borough of Grafenau, Bavaria
  - a borough of Engelskirchen, North Rhine-Westphalia
  - a borough of Langenpreising, Bavaria
  - Rosenau (Königsberg), a former quarter of Königsberg, Prussia
- in France:
  - Rosenau, Haut-Rhin, a commune in the region of Grand Est

Rosenau is the German name of:

- Râşnov, Romania
- Rožnov pod Radhoštěm, Czech Republic
- Rožňava, Slovakia
- Zilupe, Latvia
- Jastrzębowo, Poland

Rosenau is a surname. Notable people with the surname include:

- James N. Rosenau (1924–2011), American political scientist and international affairs scholar
- Milton J. Rosenau (1869–1946), American public health official and professor
- William Rosenau (1865-1943), Leader of Reform Judaism
