= Brudzewko =

- Village
- Location within Poland
- Coordinates: 52°36′N 17°18′E
- Country: Poland
- Voivodeship: Greater Poland
- County: Gniezno
- Gmina: Kiszkowo

Brudzewko [bruˈd͡zɛfkɔ] is a village in the administrative district of Gmina Kiszkowo, within Gniezno County, Greater Poland Voivodeship, in west-central Poland.
