= Łagiewniki Kościelne =

- Village
- Location within Poland
- Coordinates: 52°37′N 17°20′E
- Country: Poland
- Voivodeship: Greater Poland
- County: Gniezno
- Gmina: Kiszkowo

Łagiewniki Kościelne [waɡʲɛvˈniki kɔɕˈt͡ɕɛlnɛ] is a village in the administrative district of Gmina Kiszkowo, within Gniezno County, Greater Poland Voivodeship, in west-central Poland.

The village has a church which lies on the Wooden Churches Trail around Puszcza Zielonka.
