= Lubiń, Gniezno County =

Lubiń
- Village
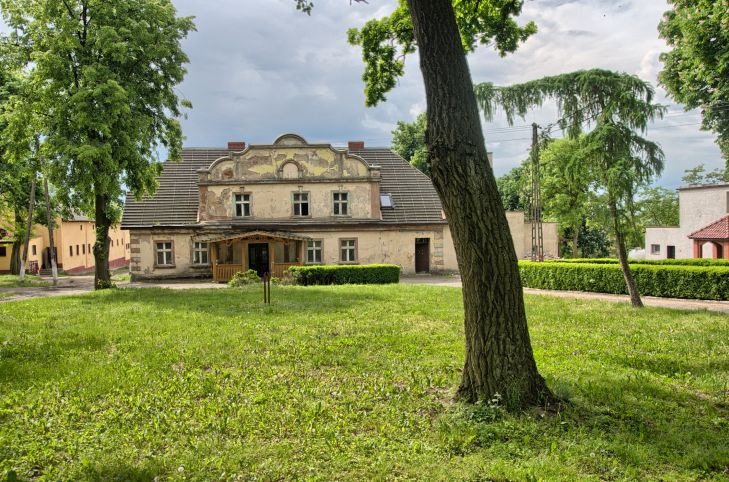
- Manor house in Lubiń

- Location within Poland
- Coordinates: 52°35′N 17°52′E
- Country: Poland
- Voivodeship: Greater Poland
- County: Gniezno
- Gmina: Trzemeszno

Population (approx.)
  - Total: 280

Lubiń [ˈlubiɲ] is a village in the administrative district of Gmina Trzemeszno, within Gniezno County, Greater Poland Voivodeship, in west-central Poland.

The village has an approximate population of 280.
