= Brzozowiec, Greater Poland Voivodeship =

Brzozowiec
- Village
- Location within Poland
- Coordinates: 52°33′13″N 17°47′46″E
- Country: Poland
- Voivodeship: Greater Poland
- County: Gniezno
- Gmina: Trzemeszno

Brzozowiec [bʐɔˈzɔvjɛt͡s] is a village in the administrative district of Gmina Trzemeszno, within Gniezno County, Greater Poland Voivodeship, in west-central Poland.
