= Kamieniec, Gmina Trzemeszno =

Kamieniec
- Village
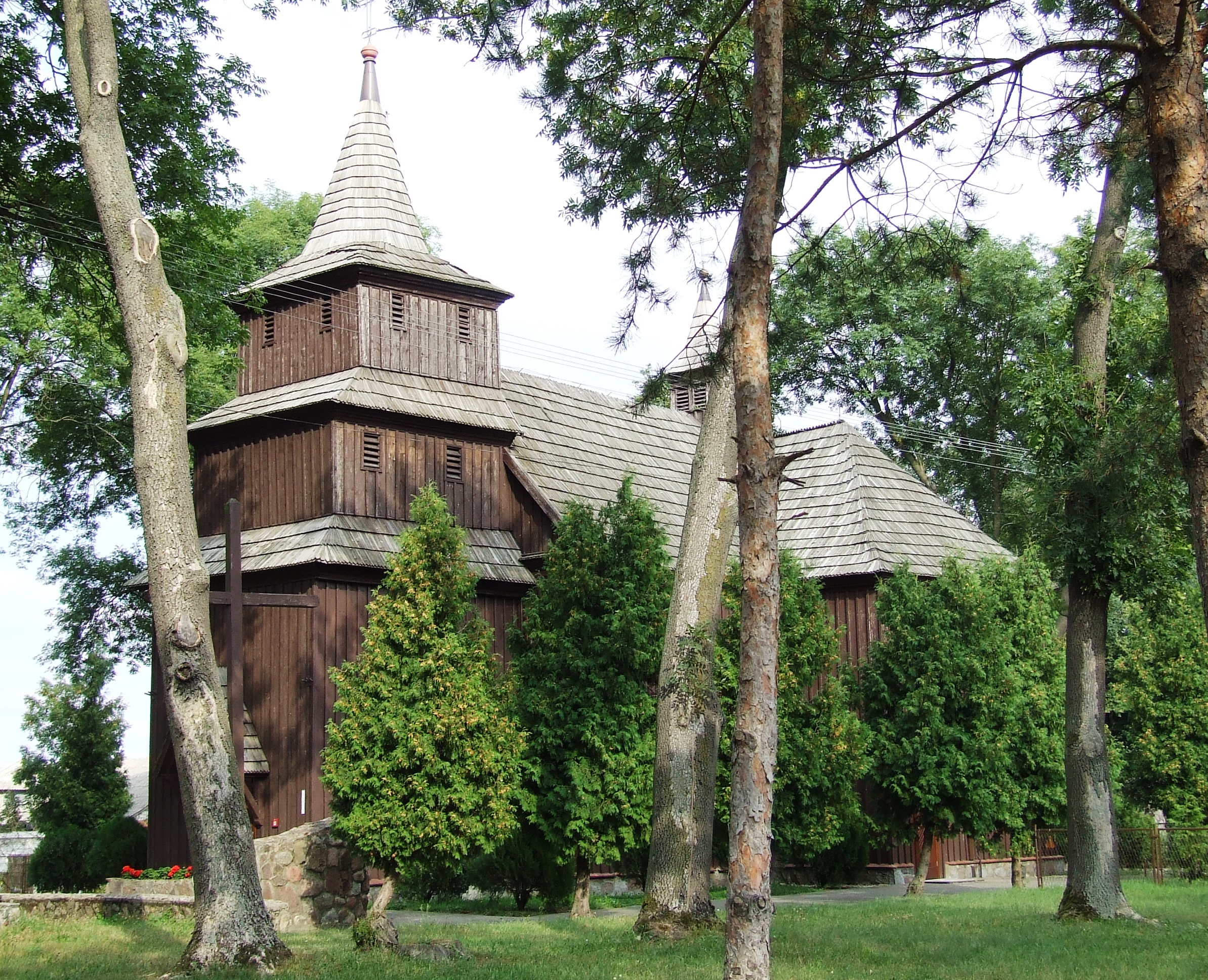
- Saint James the Greater church in Kamieniec

- Location within Poland
- Coordinates: 52°32′42″N 17°57′46″E
- Country: Poland
- Voivodeship: Greater Poland
- County: Gniezno
- Gmina: Trzemeszno

Kamieniec [kaˈmjɛɲɛt͡s] is a village in the administrative district of Gmina Trzemeszno, within Gniezno County, Greater Poland Voivodeship, in west-central Poland.
