= Darmoszewo =

- Village
- Location within Poland
- Coordinates: 52°35′17″N 17°14′02″E
- Country: Poland
- Voivodeship: Greater Poland
- County: Gniezno
- Gmina: Kiszkowo

Darmoszewo [darmɔˈʂɛvɔ] is a village in the administrative district of Gmina Kiszkowo, within Gniezno County, Greater Poland Voivodeship, in west-central Poland.
