= Wymysłowo, Gniezno County =

Wymysłowo
- Village
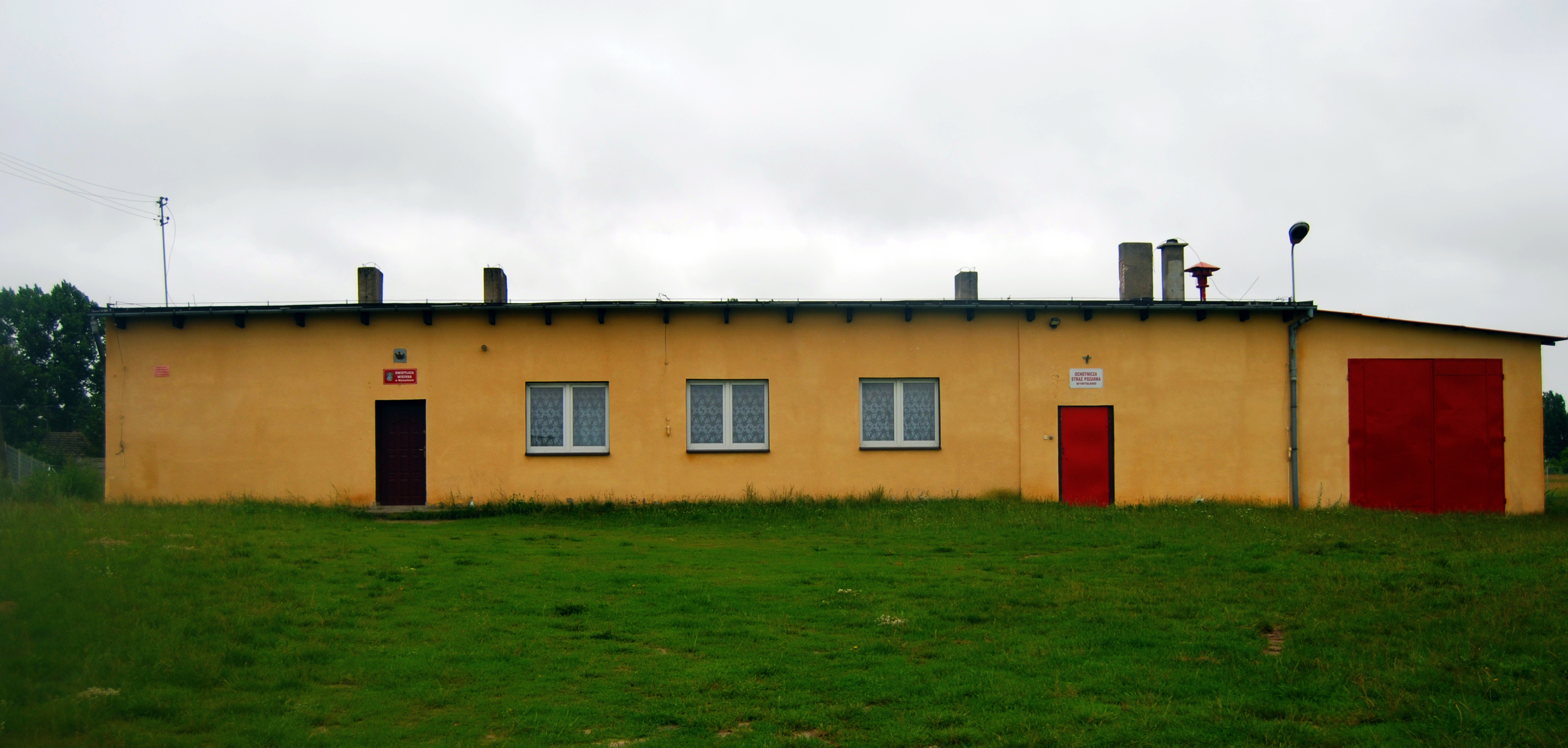

- Location within Poland
- Coordinates: 52°32′25″N 17°45′34″E
- Country: Poland
- Voivodeship: Greater Poland
- County: Gniezno
- Gmina: Trzemeszno

Wymysłowo [vɨmɨˈswɔvɔ] is a village in the administrative district of Gmina Trzemeszno, within Gniezno County, Greater Poland Voivodeship, in west-central Poland.
