= Głębokie, Gniezno County =

Głębokie
- Village
- Location within Poland
- Coordinates: 52°34′N 17°20′E
- Country: Poland
- Voivodeship: Greater Poland
- County: Gniezno
- Gmina: Kiszkowo

Głębokie ([ɡwɛmˈbɔkʲɛ]; German: Glembokie, 1939–45 Ährenfelde) is a village in the administrative district of Gmina Kiszkowo, within Gniezno County, Greater Poland Voivodeship, in west-central Poland.
