= Gołąbki, Greater Poland Voivodeship =

Gołąbki
- Village
- Location within Poland
- Coordinates: 52°38′28″N 17°45′2″E
- Country: Poland
- Voivodeship: Greater Poland
- County: Gniezno
- Gmina: Trzemeszno

Gołąbki [ɡɔˈwɔmpki] is a village in the administrative district of Gmina Trzemeszno, within Gniezno County, Greater Poland Voivodeship, in west-central Poland.
