= Powiadacze =

- Village
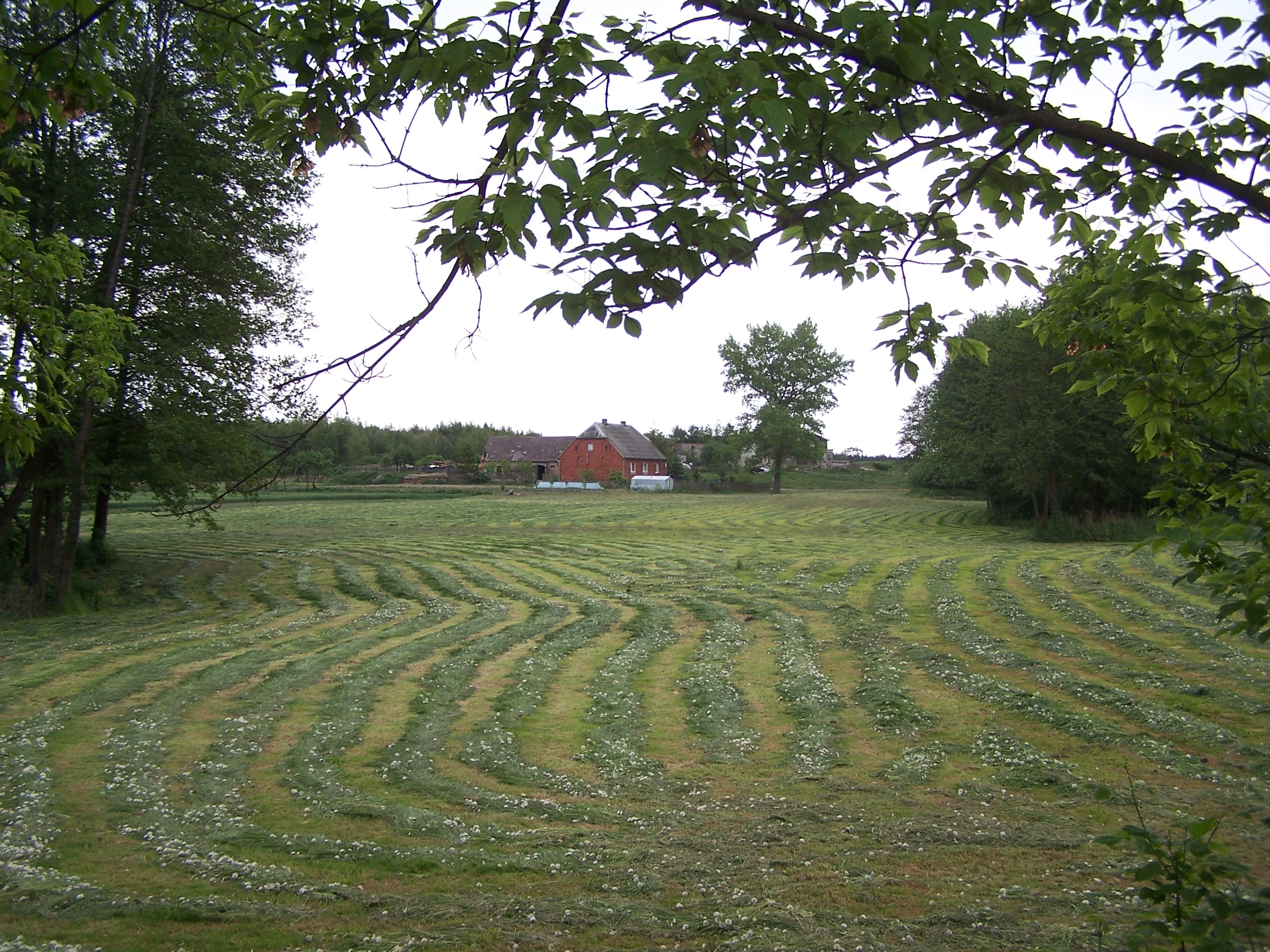
- View of Powiadacze village

- Location within Poland
- Coordinates: 52°38′12″N 17°48′55″E
- Country: Poland
- Voivodeship: Greater Poland
- County: Gniezno
- Gmina: Trzemeszno
- Time zone: UTC+1 (CET)
  - Summer (DST): UTC+2 (CEST)

Powiadacze [pɔvjaˈdat͡ʂɛ] is a village in the administrative district of Gmina Trzemeszno, within Gniezno County, Greater Poland Voivodeship, in west-central Poland.
