= Popowo Tomkowe =

- Village
- Location within Poland
- Coordinates: 52°41′N 17°33′E
- Country: Poland
- Voivodeship: Greater Poland
- County: Gniezno
- Gmina: Mieleszyn

Popowo Tomkowe [pɔˈpɔvɔ tɔmˈkɔvɛ] is a village in the administrative district of Gmina Mieleszyn, within Gniezno County, Greater Poland Voivodeship, in west-central Poland.
