= Szydłowo Drugie =

- Settlement
- Location within Poland
- Coordinates: 52°34′19″N 17°55′6″E
- Country: Poland
- Voivodeship: Greater Poland
- County: Gniezno
- Gmina: Trzemeszno

Szydłowo Drugie [ʂɨˈdwɔvɔ ˈdruɡʲɛ] is a settlement in the administrative district of Gmina Trzemeszno, within Gniezno County, Greater Poland Voivodeship, in west-central Poland.
