= Niewolno =

- Village
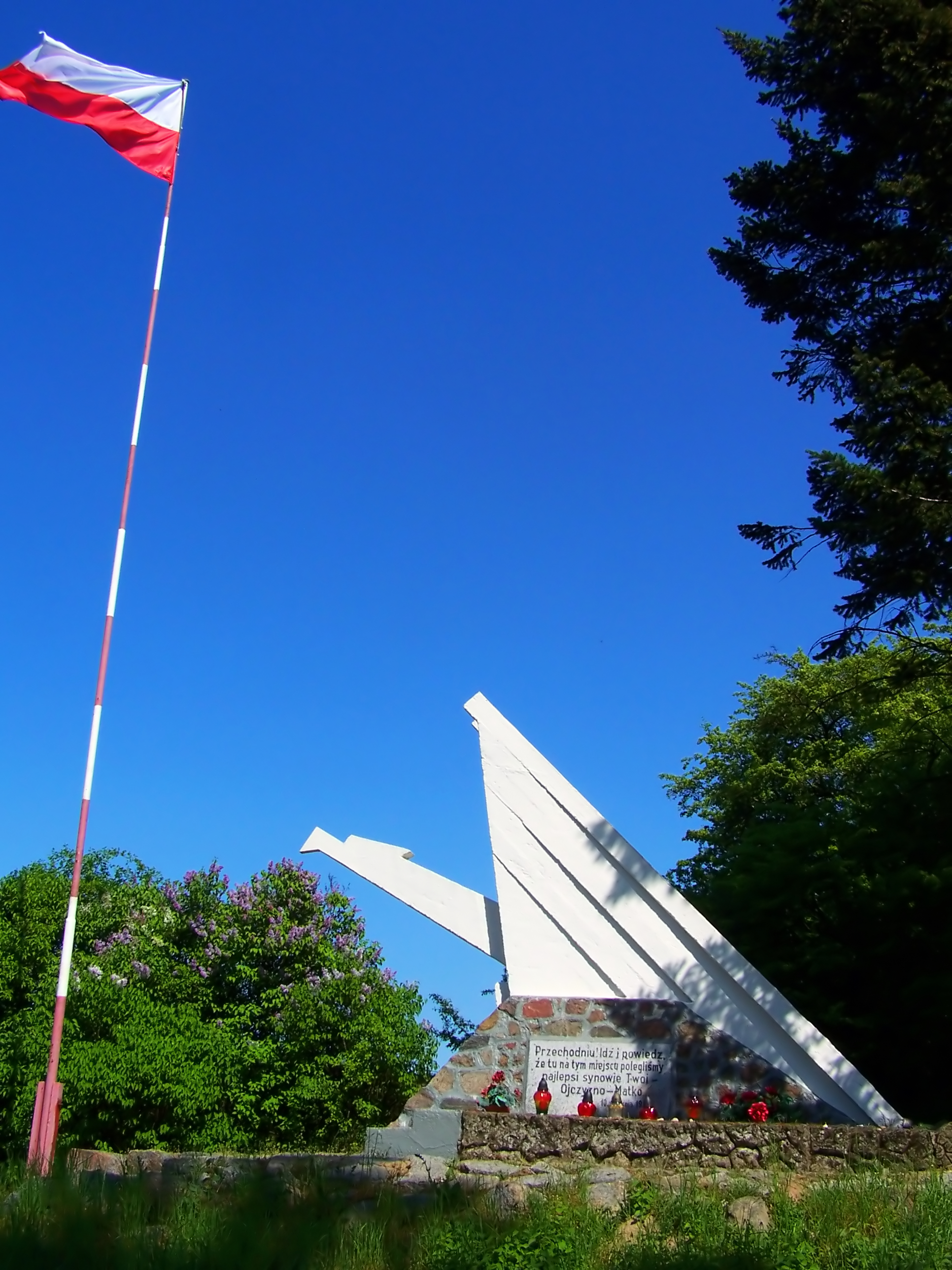
- A monument to citizens of Niewolno murdered during the German occupation of Poland

- Location within Poland
- Coordinates: 52°35′N 17°49′E
- Country: Poland
- Voivodeship: Greater Poland
- County: Gniezno
- Gmina: Trzemeszno
- Time zone: UTC+1 (CET)
  - Summer (DST): UTC+2 (CEST)
- Vehicle registration: PGN

Niewolno [ɲɛˈvɔlnɔ] is a village in the administrative district of Gmina Trzemeszno, within Gniezno County, Greater Poland Voivodeship, in central Poland.

== History ==
As part of the region of Greater Poland, i.e. the cradle of the Polish state, the area formed part of Poland since its establishment in the 10th century. Niewolno was a private church village of the monastery in Trzemeszno, administratively located in the Gniezno County in the Kalisz Voivodeship in the Greater Poland Province of the Kingdom of Poland.

During the German invasion of Poland at the start of World War II, it was the site of a Polish defense, and on September 11, 1939, German troops carried out a massacre of 18 captured Polish defenders of the village (see Nazi crimes against the Polish nation). During the subsequent German occupation, in 1939 and 1941, the occupiers carried out expulsions of Poles, whose houses and farms were handed over to new German colonists as part of the Lebensraum policy. Expelled Poles were either enslaved as forced labour of the colonists or placed in a transit camp in nearby Szczeglin, robbed of money and valuable possessions and deported in freight trains to the General Government in the more eastern part of German-occupied Poland.
