= Ignalin =

Ignalin may refer to the following places:

- Ignalin, Greater Poland Voivodeship (west-central Poland)
- Ignalin, Kuyavian-Pomeranian Voivodeship (north-central Poland)
- Ignalin, Warmian-Masurian Voivodeship (north Poland)
