= Popowo-Ignacewo =

- Village
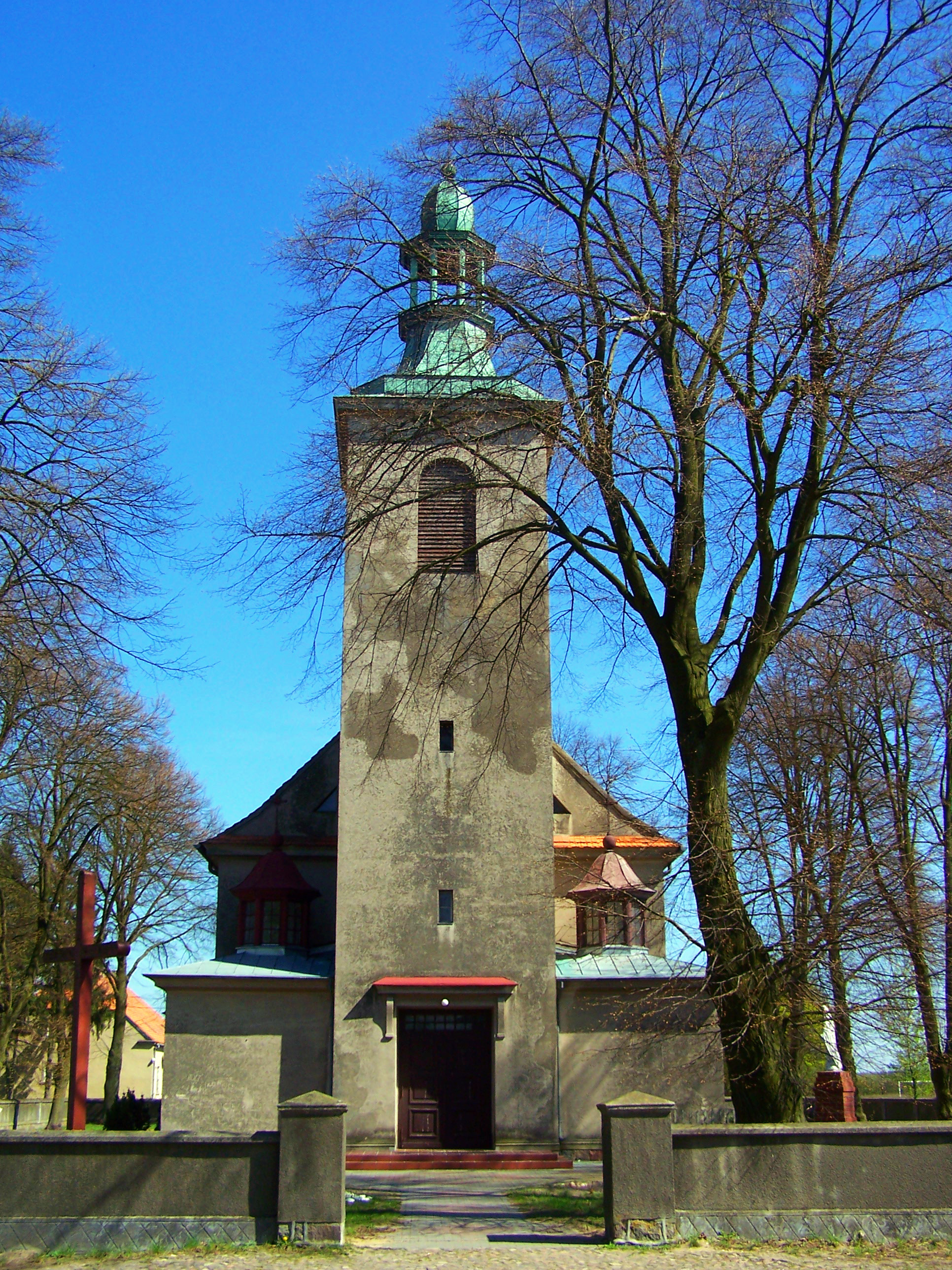

- Location within Poland
- Coordinates: 52°39′36″N 17°32′56″E
- Country: Poland
- Voivodeship: Greater Poland
- County: Gniezno
- Gmina: Mieleszyn
- Population: 197

Popowo-Ignacewo [pɔˈpɔvɔ iɡnaˈt͡sɛvɔ] is a village in the administrative district of Gmina Mieleszyn, within Gniezno County, Greater Poland Voivodeship, in west-central Poland.
