= Łubowice, Greater Poland Voivodeship =

Łubowice
- Village
- Location within Poland
- Coordinates: 52°36′29″N 17°15′09″E
- Country: Poland
- Voivodeship: Greater Poland
- County: Gniezno
- Gmina: Kiszkowo

Łubowice [wubɔˈvit͡sɛ] is a village in the administrative district of Gmina Kiszkowo, within Gniezno County, Greater Poland Voivodeship, in west-central Poland.
