= Sławno, Gniezno County =

Sławno
- Village
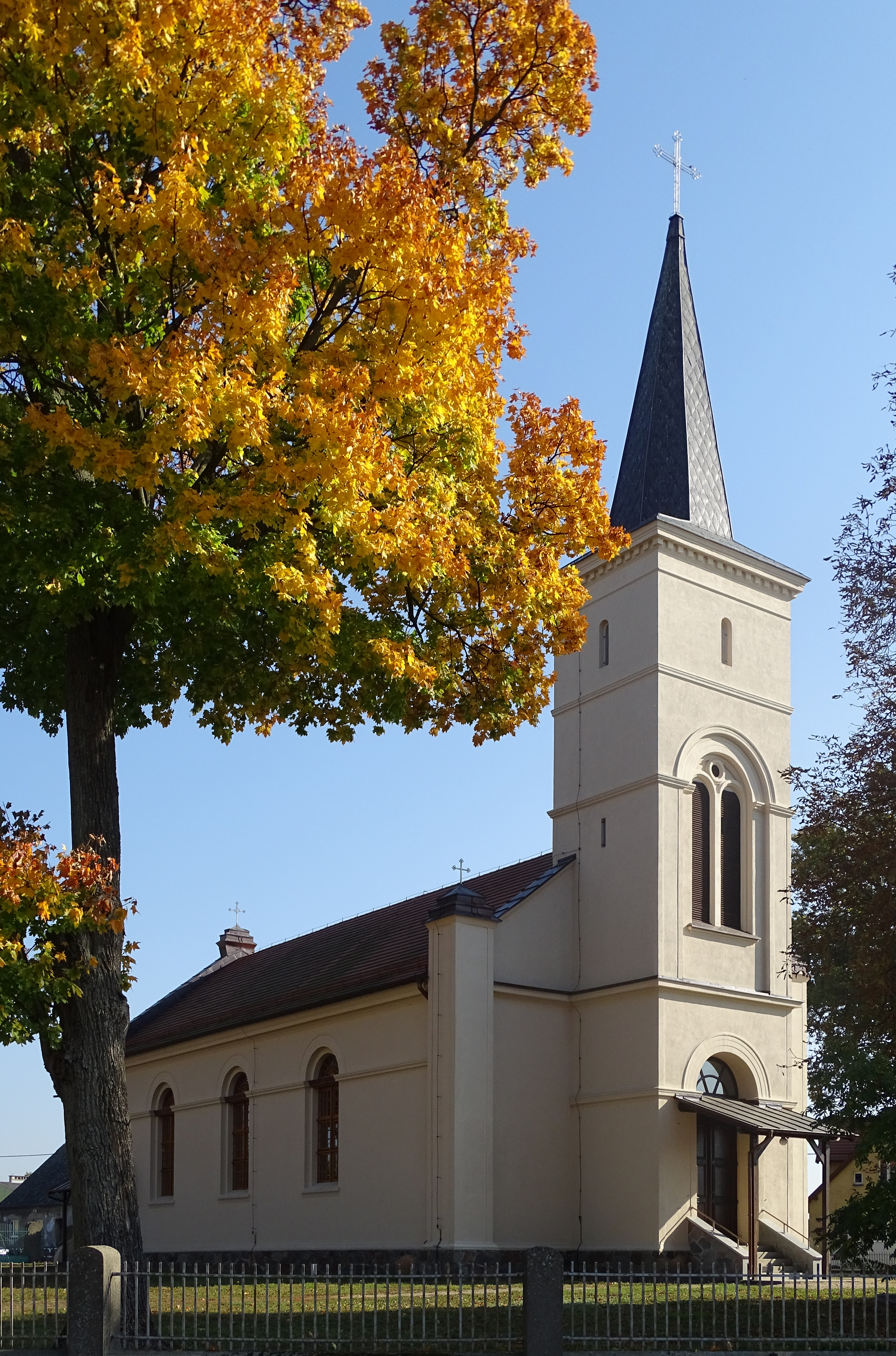
- Parish church of Saint Nicholas from 1844

- Location within Poland
- Coordinates: 52°35′N 17°21′E
- Country: Poland
- Voivodeship: Greater Poland
- County: Gniezno
- Gmina: Kiszkowo
- Population: 435

Sławno [ˈswavnɔ] is a village in the administrative district of Gmina Kiszkowo, within Gniezno County, Greater Poland Voivodeship, in west-central Poland.

The village has a church which lies on the Wooden Churches Trail around Puszcza Zielonka.
