= Kamionek Wielki =

Kamionek Wielki may refer to the following places in Warmian-Masurian Voivodeship, Poland:

- Kamionek Wielki, Elbląg County
- Kamionek Wielki, Węgorzewo County

== See also ==
- Kamionek (disambiguation)
