= Dębłowo =

- Village
- Location within Poland
- Coordinates: 52°37′48″N 17°34′45″E
- Country: Poland
- Voivodeship: Greater Poland
- County: Gniezno
- Gmina: Mieleszyn

Dębłowo [dɛmˈbwɔvɔ] is a village in the administrative district of Gmina Mieleszyn, within Gniezno County, Greater Poland Voivodeship, in west-central Poland.

Polish politician Wojciech Trąmpczyński was born here.
