= Charzewo =

- Village
- Location within Poland
- Coordinates: 52°33′31″N 17°17′46″E
- Country: Poland
- Voivodeship: Greater Poland
- County: Gniezno
- Gmina: Kiszkowo
- Population: 500

Charzewo [xaˈʐɛvɔ] is a village in the administrative district of Gmina Kiszkowo, within Gniezno County, Greater Poland Voivodeship, in west-central Poland.
