= Zieleń =

Zieleń may refer to the following places:

- Zieleń, Greater Poland Voivodeship (west-central Poland)
- Zieleń, Kuyavian-Pomeranian Voivodeship (north-central Poland)
- Zieleń, Łódź Voivodeship (central Poland)
- Zieleń, Warmian-Masurian Voivodeship (north Poland)
