= Płaczkowo =

Płaczkowo may refer to the following places:

- Płaczkowo, Gniezno County in Greater Poland Voivodeship (west-central Poland)
- Płaczkowo, Gostyń County in Greater Poland Voivodeship (west-central Poland)
- Płaczkowo, Rawicz County in Greater Poland Voivodeship (west-central Poland)
