= Folusz, Greater Poland Voivodeship =

Folusz
- Settlement
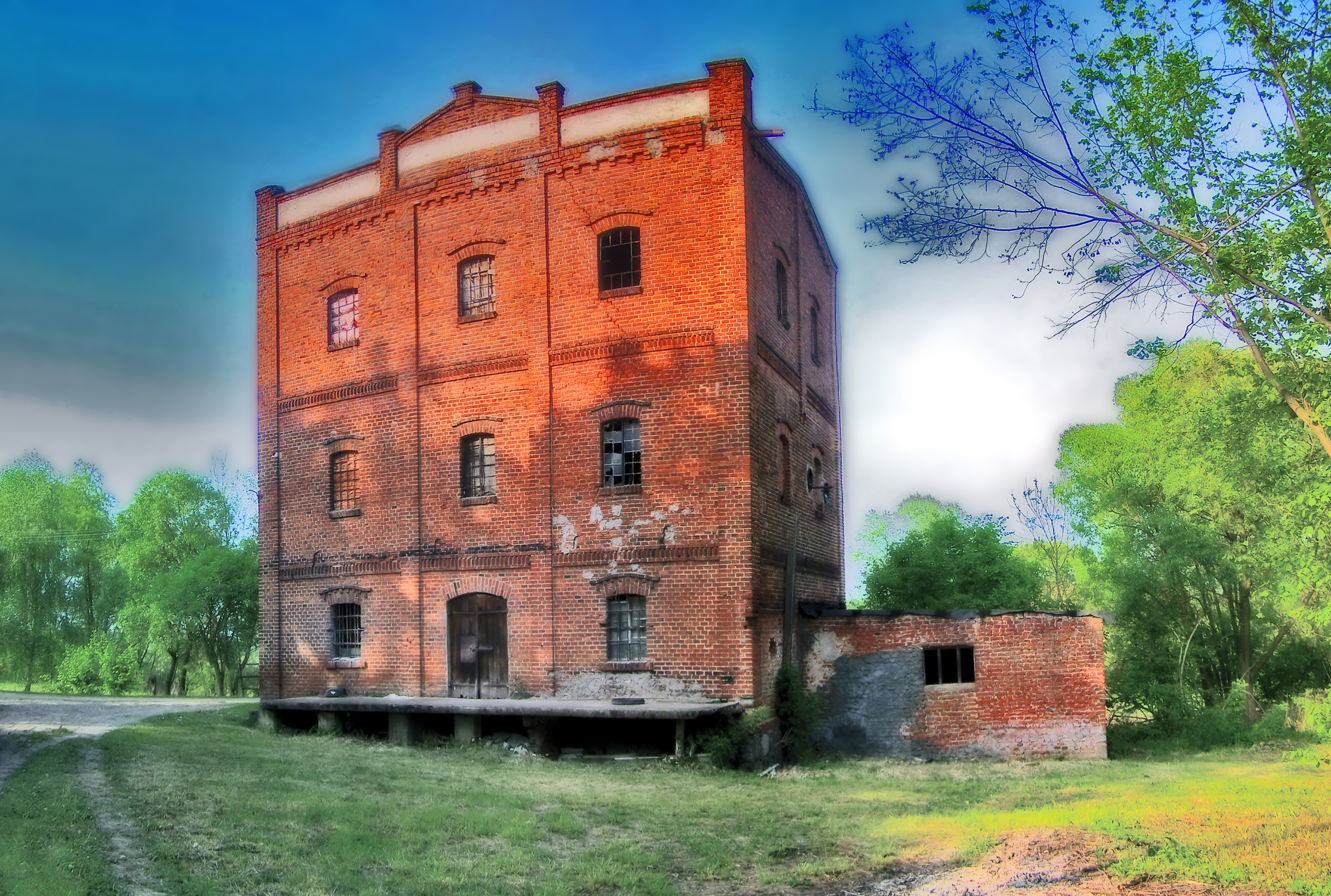
- Mill in Folusz

- Location within Poland
- Coordinates: 52°36′00″N 17°49′30″E
- Country: Poland
- Voivodeship: Greater Poland
- County: Gniezno
- Gmina: Trzemeszno

Folusz [ˈfɔluʂ] is a settlement in the administrative district of Gmina Trzemeszno, within Gniezno County, Greater Poland Voivodeship, in west-central Poland.
