= Rybno, Gniezno County =

Village in Greater Poland Voivodeship, Poland

Rybno
- Village
- Location within Poland
- Coordinates: 52°36′39″N 17°17′15″E
- Country: Poland
- Voivodeship: Greater Poland
- County: Gniezno
- Gmina: Kiszkowo
- Population: 860

Rybno [ˈrɨbnɔ] is a village in the administrative district of Gmina Kiszkowo, within Gniezno County, Greater Poland Voivodeship, in west-central Poland.
