= Gmina Kiszkowo =

Administrative district in Poland

Gmina Kiszkowo Kiszkowo Commune
- Gmina
- Interactive map of Gmina Kiszkowo
- Coordinates (Kiszkowo): 52°35′27″N 17°15′23″E
- Country: Poland
- Voivodeship: Greater Poland
- County: Gniezno
- Seat: Kiszkowo

Area
  - Total: 114.58 km^{2} (44.24 sq mi)

Population (2006)
  - Total: 5,235
  - Density: 45.69/km^{2} (118.3/sq mi)
- Website: http://www.kiszkowo.pl

Gmina Kiszkowo is a rural gmina (administrative district) in Gniezno County, Greater Poland Voivodeship, in west-central Poland. Its seat is the village of Kiszkowo, which lies approximately 25 kilometres (16 mi) west of Gniezno and 32 km (20 mi) north-east of the regional capital Poznań.

The gmina covers an area of 114.58 square kilometres (44.2 sq mi), and as of 2006 its total population is 5,235. It includes the village of Dąbrówka Kościelna, whose church has for centuries been a destination for Roman Catholic pilgrims.

The gmina contains part of the protected area called Puszcza Zielonka Landscape Park.

== Villages ==
Gmina Kiszkowo contains the villages and settlements of Berkowo, Brudzewko, Charzewo, Dąbrówka Kościelna, Darmoszewo, Głębokie, Gniewkowo, Imiołki, Kamionek, Karczewko, Karczewo, Kiszkowo, Łagiewniki Kościelne, Łubowice, Łubowiczki, Myszki, Olekszyn, Rybieniec, Rybno, Skrzetuszewo, Sławno, Sroczyn, Turostówko, Turostowo, Ujazd, Węgorzewo and Wola Łagiewnicka.

== Neighbouring gminas ==
Gmina Kiszkowo is bordered by the gminas of Kłecko, Łubowo, Murowana Goślina, Pobiedziska and Skoki.
