= Standesamt Tremessen =

Civil registration district

Standesamt Tremessen was a civil registration district (Standesamt) located in Kreis Mogilno, province of Posen of the German Empire (1871-1918) and administered the communities of:

Community	Polish name	Type	1895 Pop	Prot	Cath	Jew	Civil Ofc	Police Ofc	Court Ofc	Cath. Ch	Prot. Ch	Notes	More
Tremessen	Trzemeszno	Town

Population data may be inaccurate (see German census of 1895).
