= Kiszkowo, Greater Poland Voivodeship =

Kiszkowo
- Village
- Location within Poland
- Coordinates: 52°35′27″N 17°15′23″E
- Country: Poland
- Voivodeship: Greater Poland
- County: Gniezno
- Gmina: Kiszkowo
- Population (approx.): 1,000
- Climate: Dfb
- Website: www.kiszkowo.pl

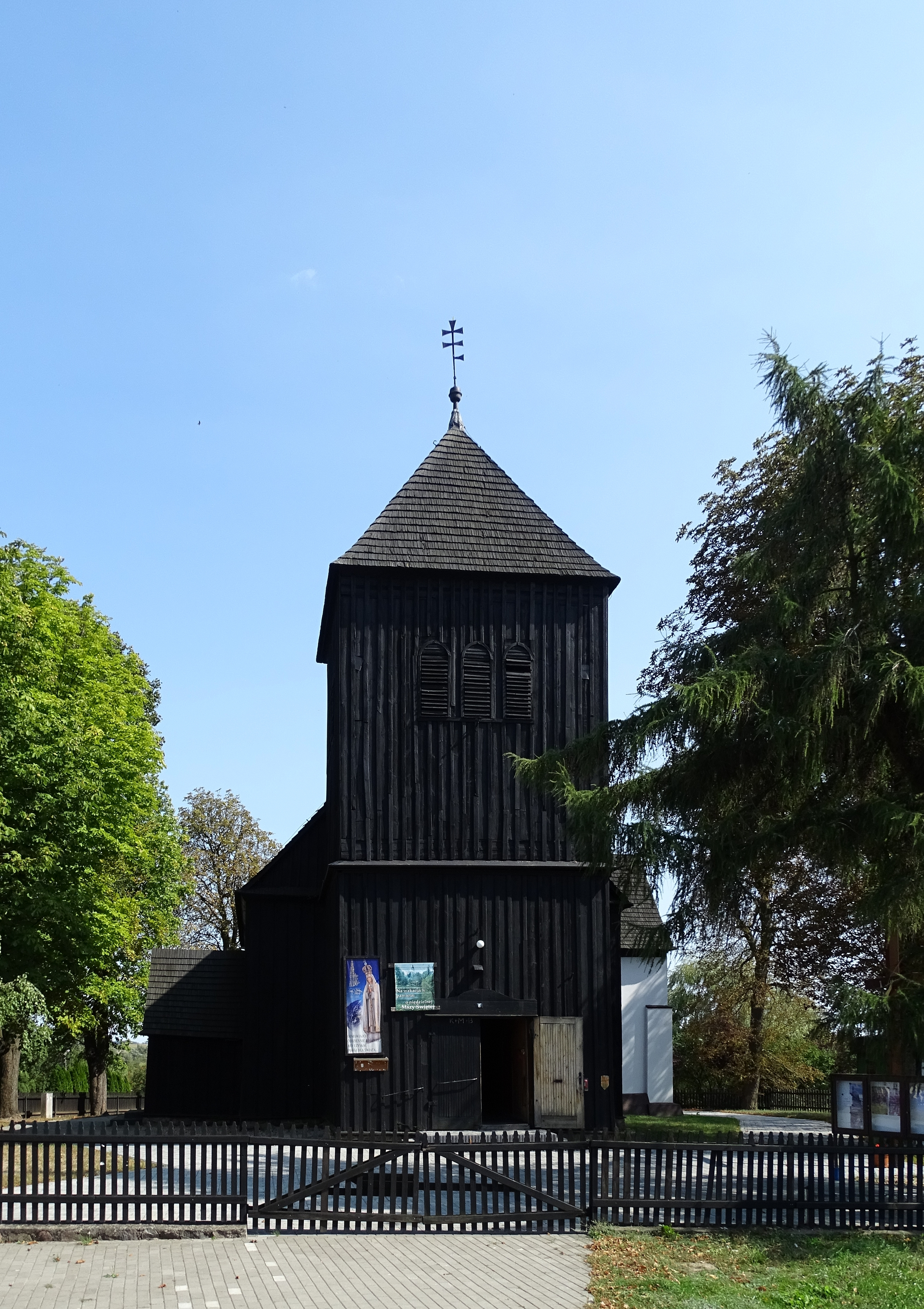
Kiszkowo, Greater Poland. Wooden church of Saint John the Baptist from 1733 with a brick burial chapel from 1695.

Kiszkowo [kiʂˈkɔvɔ] (German: Welnau, 1875–1945) is a village in Gniezno County, Greater Poland Voivodeship, in west-central Poland. It is the seat of the gmina (administrative district) called Gmina Kiszkowo.

The village has an approximate population of 1,000. It has a church which lies on the Wooden Churches Trail around Puszcza Zielonka.
