= Kamionek (disambiguation) =

Kamionek is a district of Warsaw.

Kamionek may also refer to the following places in Poland:

- Kamionek, Greater Poland Voivodeship (west-central Poland)
- Kamionek, Kuyavian-Pomeranian Voivodeship (north-central Poland)
- Kamionek, Opole Voivodeship (south-west Poland)
- Kamionek, Warmian-Masurian Voivodeship (north Poland)
