= Kamionek, Greater Poland Voivodeship =

Kamionek
- Village
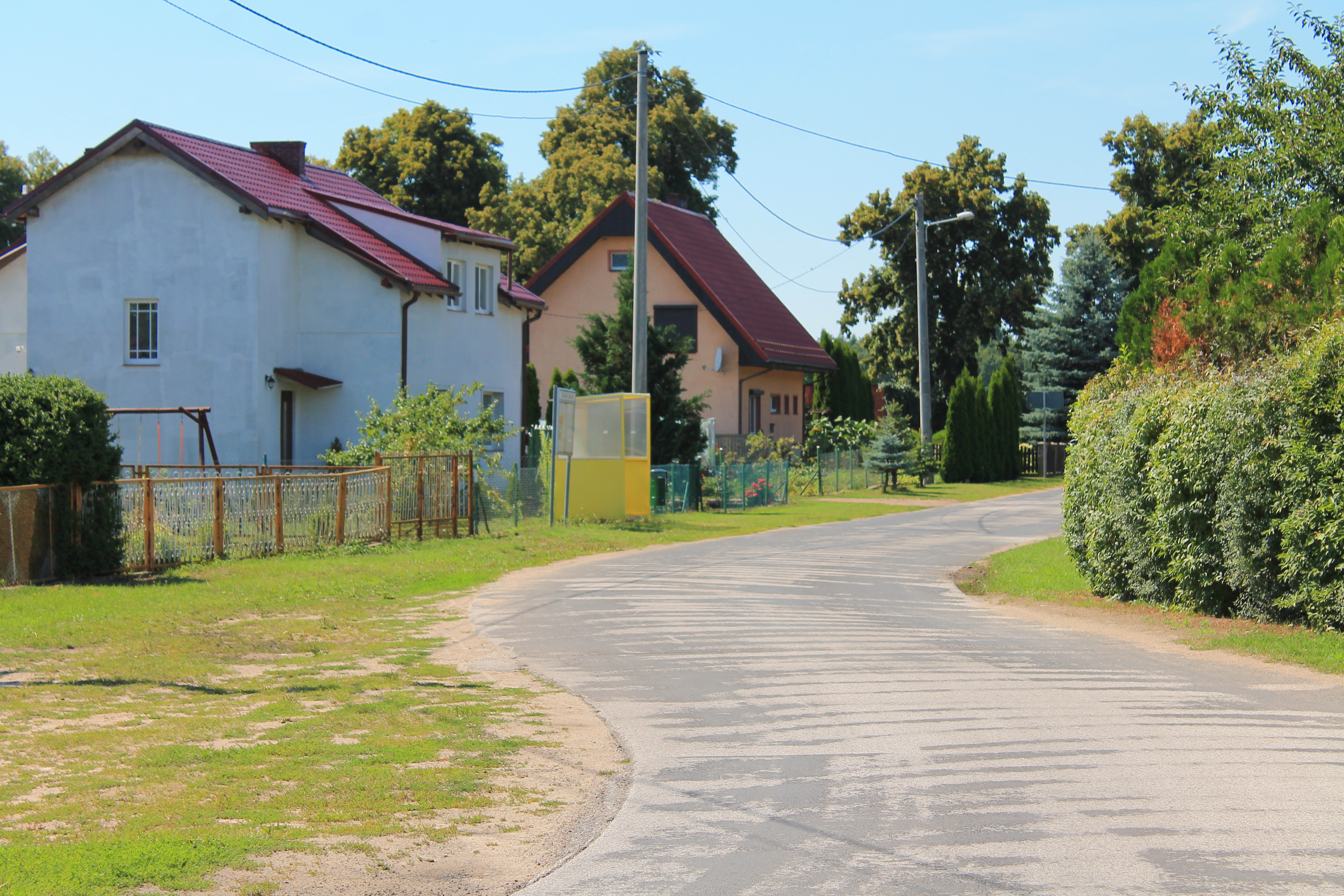

- Location within Poland
- Coordinates: 52°35′05″N 17°23′26″E
- Country: Poland
- Voivodeship: Greater Poland
- County: Gniezno
- Gmina: Kiszkowo

Kamionek [kaˈmjɔnɛk] is a village in the administrative district of Gmina Kiszkowo, within Gniezno County, Greater Poland Voivodeship, in west-central Poland.
