= Mieleszyn, Greater Poland Voivodeship =

Mieleszyn
- Village
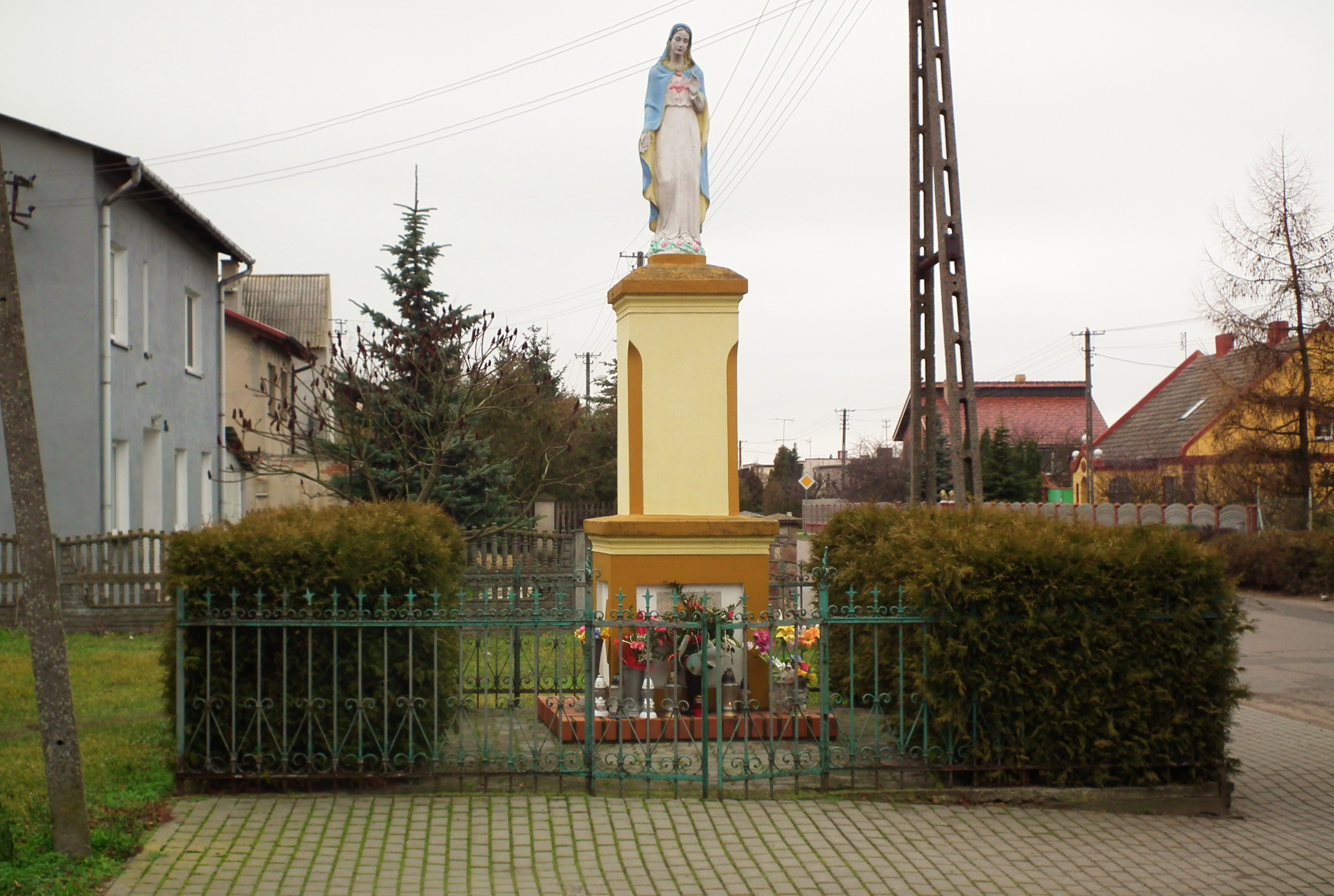
- Wayside shrine in Mieleszyn

- Location within Poland
- Coordinates: 52°40′5″N 17°30′2″E
- Country: Poland
- Voivodeship: Greater Poland
- County: Gniezno
- Gmina: Mieleszyn
- Population: 763
- Time zone: UTC+1 (CET)
  - Summer (DST): UTC+2 (CEST)
- Climate: Dfb

Mieleszyn [mjɛˈlɛʂɨn] is a village in Gniezno County, Greater Poland Voivodeship, in west-central Poland. It is the seat of the gmina (administrative district) called Gmina Mieleszyn.

During the German occupation (World War II), Mieleszyn was one of the sites of executions of Poles, carried out by the Germans in 1939 as part of the Intelligenzaktion.
