= Skrzetuszewo =

- Village
- Location within Poland
- Coordinates: 52°32′N 17°21′E
- Country: Poland
- Voivodeship: Greater Poland
- County: Gniezno
- Gmina: Kiszkowo
- Population: 270

Skrzetuszewo [skʂɛtuˈʂɛvɔ] (German: Ramsau) is a village in the administrative district of Gmina Kiszkowo, within Gniezno County, Greater Poland Voivodeship, in west-central Poland.
