= Dąbrowa, Gniezno County =

Dąbrowa
- Settlement
- Location within Poland
- Coordinates: 52°36′14″N 17°46′32″E
- Country: Poland
- Voivodeship: Greater Poland
- County: Gniezno
- Gmina: Trzemeszno

Dąbrowa [dɔmˈbrɔva] is a settlement in the administrative district of Gmina Trzemeszno, within Gniezno County, Greater Poland Voivodeship, in west-central Poland.
