= Zieleń, Greater Poland Voivodeship =

Zieleń
- Village
- Location within Poland
- Coordinates: 52°33′N 17°51′E
- Country: Poland
- Voivodeship: Greater Poland
- County: Gniezno
- Gmina: Trzemeszno

Zieleń [ˈʑɛlɛɲ] is a village in the administrative district of Gmina Trzemeszno, within Gniezno County, Greater Poland Voivodeship, in west-central Poland.
