= Gmina Mieleszyn =

Gmina Mieleszyn Mieleszyn Commune
- Gmina
- Coat of arms
- Interactive map of Gmina Mieleszyn
- Coordinates (Mieleszyn): 52°40′5″N 17°30′2″E
- Country: Poland
- Voivodeship: Greater Poland
- County: Gniezno
- Seat: Mieleszyn

Area
  - Total: 99.24 km^{2} (38.32 sq mi)

Population (2006)
  - Total: 3,989
  - Density: 40.20/km^{2} (104.1/sq mi)
- Website: http://www.mieleszyn.pl

Gmina Mieleszyn is a rural gmina (administrative district) in Gniezno County, Greater Poland Voivodeship, in west-central Poland. Its seat is the village of Mieleszyn, which lies approximately 17 kilometres (11 mi) north-west of Gniezno and 50 km (31 mi) north-east of the regional capital Poznań.

The gmina covers an area of 99.24 square kilometres (38.3 sq mi), and as of 2006 its total population is 3,989.

== Villages ==
Gmina Mieleszyn contains the villages and settlements of Borzątew, Dębłowo, Dobiejewo, Dziadkówko, Dziadkowo, Karniszewo, Kowalewko, Kowalewo, Łopienno, Mieleszyn, Mielno, Nowaszyce, Popowo Podleśne, Popowo Tomkowe, Popowo-Ignacewo, Przysieka, Sokolniki, Świątniki Małe and Świątniki Wielkie.

== Neighbouring gminas ==
Gmina Mieleszyn is bordered by the gminas of Gniezno, Janowiec Wielkopolski, Kłecko, Mieścisko and Rogowo.
