= Węgorzewo, Greater Poland Voivodeship =

Węgorzewo
- Village
- Location within Poland
- Coordinates: 52°35′N 17°17′E
- Country: Poland
- Voivodeship: Greater Poland
- County: Gniezno
- Gmina: Kiszkowo

Węgorzewo [vɛnɡɔˈʐɛvɔ] (German: Wengershof) is a village in the administrative district of Gmina Kiszkowo, within Gniezno County, Greater Poland Voivodeship, in west-central Poland.
