= Płaczkowo, Gniezno County =

Płaczkowo
- Village
- Location within Poland
- Coordinates: 52°34′06″N 17°56′13″E
- Country: Poland
- Voivodeship: Greater Poland
- County: Gniezno
- Gmina: Trzemeszno

Płaczkowo [pwat͡ʂˈkɔvɔ] is a village in the administrative district of Gmina Trzemeszno, within Gniezno County, Greater Poland Voivodeship, in west-central Poland.
