= Ignalin, Greater Poland Voivodeship =

Ignalin
- Settlement
- Location within Poland
- Coordinates: 52°37′28″N 17°50′28″E
- Country: Poland
- Voivodeship: Greater Poland
- County: Gniezno
- Gmina: Trzemeszno

Ignalin [iɡˈnalin] is a settlement in the administrative district of Gmina Trzemeszno, within Gniezno County, Greater Poland Voivodeship, in west-central Poland.
