= Gmina Trzemeszno =

Gmina Trzemeszno Trzemeszno Commune
- Gmina
- Coat of arms
- Interactive map of Gmina Trzemeszno
- Coordinates (Trzemeszno): 52°34′N 17°49′E
- Country: Poland
- Voivodeship: Greater Poland
- County: Gniezno
- Seat: Trzemeszno

Area
  - Total: 174.81 km^{2} (67.49 sq mi)

Population (2006)
  - Total: 14,019
  - Density: 80.196/km^{2} (207.71/sq mi)
  - Urban: 7,789
  - Rural: 6,230
- Website: http://www.trzemeszno.pl

Gmina Trzemeszno is an urban-rural gmina (administrative district) in Gniezno County, Greater Poland Voivodeship, in west-central Poland. Its seat is the town of Trzemeszno, which lies approximately 16 kilometres (10 mi) east of Gniezno and 64 km (40 mi) east of the regional capital Poznań.

The gmina covers an area of 174.81 square kilometres (67.5 sq mi), and as of 2006 its total population is 14,019 (out of which the population of Trzemeszno amounts to 7,789, and the population of the rural part of the gmina is 6,230).

== Villages ==
Apart from the town of Trzemeszno, Gmina Trzemeszno contains the villages and settlements of Bieślin, Brzozowiec, Bystrzyca, Cytrynowo, Dąbrowa, Duszno, Dysiek, Folusz, Gołąbki, Grabowo, Huta Trzemeszeńska, Ignalin, Jastrzębowo, Jerzykowo, Kamieniec, Kierzkowo, Kozłówko, Kozłowo, Kruchowo, Kurze Grzędy, Ławki, Lubiń, Miaty, Mijanowo, Miława, Niewolno, Ochodza, Ostrowite, Pasieka, Płaczkowo, Popielewo, Powiadacze, Rudki, Smolary, Święte, Szydłowo, Szydłowo Drugie, Trzemżal, Wydartowo, Wymysłowo and Zieleń.

== Neighbouring gminas ==
Gmina Trzemeszno is bordered by the gminas of Gniezno, Mogilno, Orchowo, Rogowo and Witkowo.
