= Przysieka, Gniezno County =

Przysieka
- Village
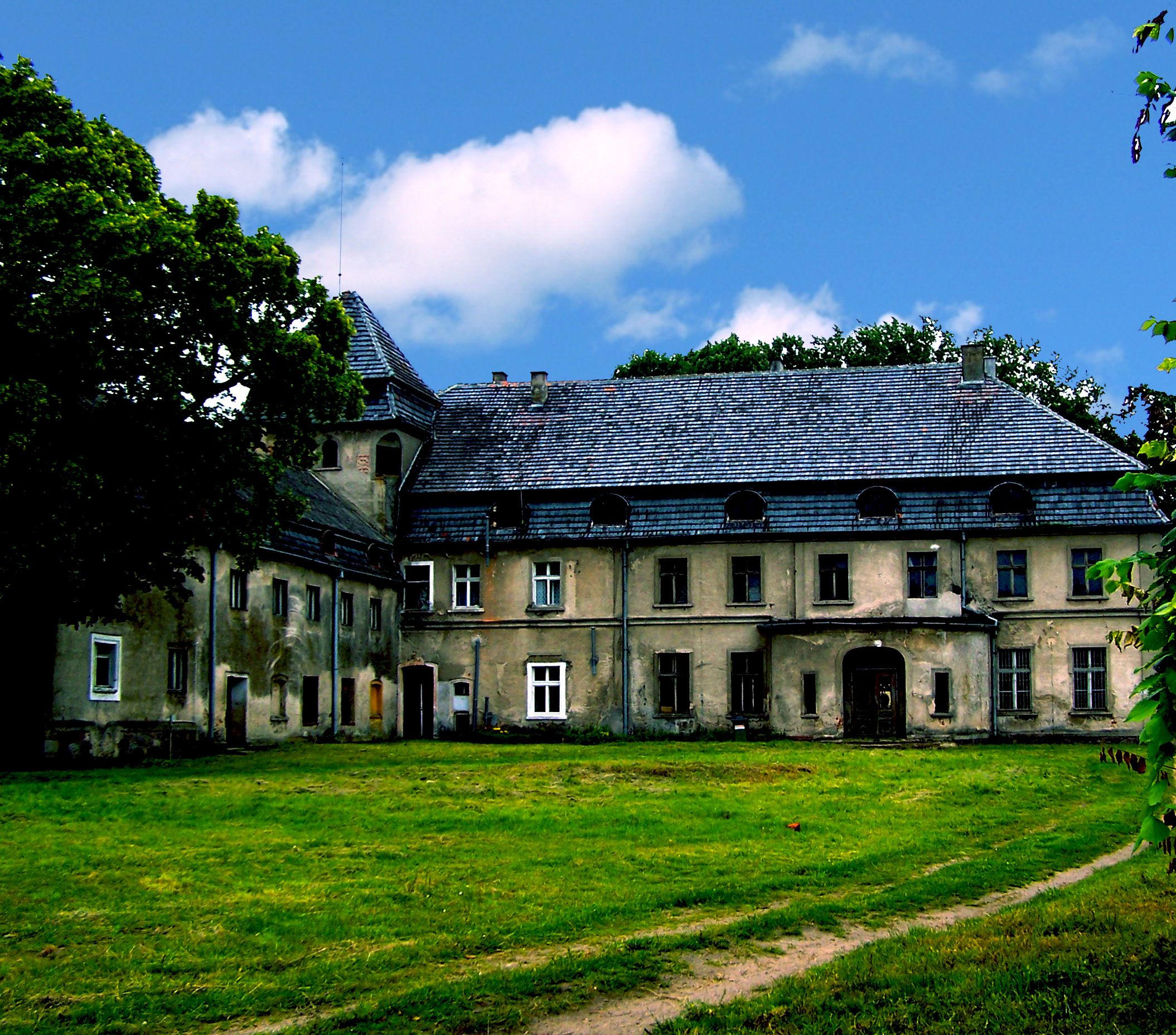
- Building in Przysieka

- Location within Poland
- Coordinates: 52°39′32″N 17°31′39″E
- Country: Poland
- Voivodeship: Greater Poland
- County: Gniezno
- Gmina: Mieleszyn

Przysieka [pʂɨˈɕɛka] is a village in the administrative district of Gmina Mieleszyn, within Gniezno County, Greater Poland Voivodeship, in west-central Poland.
