= Julian Nowak =

Polish microbiologist and politician (1865–1946)

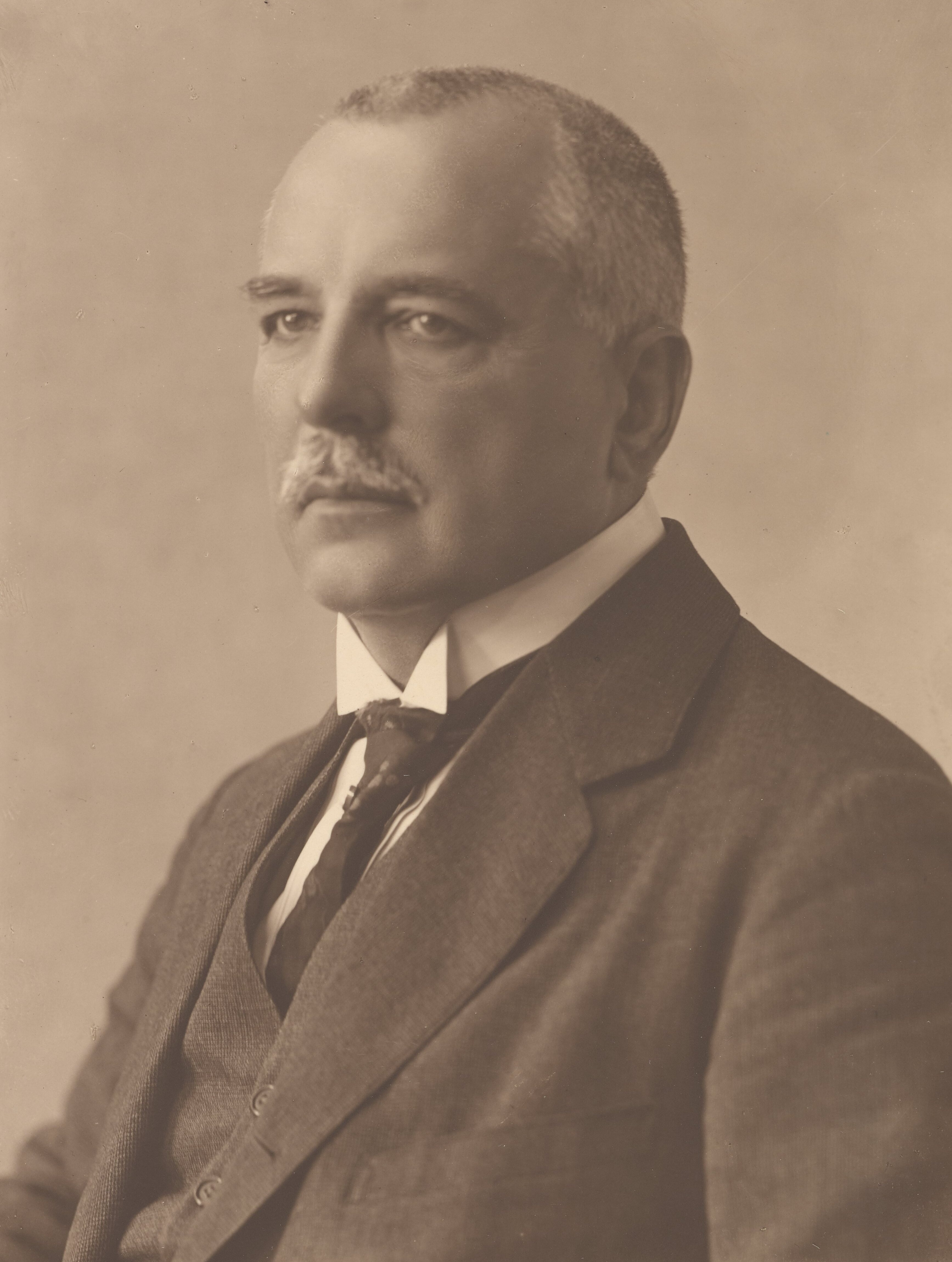
- Nowak c. 1920s-1939

Prime Minister of Poland
- In office 31 July 1922 – 14 December 1922
- President: Gabriel Narutowicz (December 1922)
- Chief of State: Józef Piłsudski (July - December 1922)
- Preceded by: Artur Śliwiński
- Succeeded by: Władysław Sikorski

Personal details
- Born: Julian Ignacy Nowak; 10 March 1865 Okocim, Austrian Empire
- Died: 7 November 1946 (aged 81) Kraków, Poland
- Party: Stronnictwo Prawicy Narodowej
- Occupation: Politician, physician

Julian Ignacy Nowak (Polish pronunciation: [ˈjuljan ˈnɔvak]; 10 March 1865 – 7 November 1946) was a Polish microbiologist and politician who served as 9th Prime Minister of Poland in 1922.

Nowak studied medicine at the Jagiellonian University in 1886–1893 and was a professor there since 1899. In 1921–1922 he was a rector of the university. Being a conservative politician, he served as the Prime Minister briefly in 1922. In the same year, he also served briefly as the Minister of Religious Affairs. In 1922–1927 he was a Senator in the Polish Senate.

He was awarded the Commander's Cross of the Order of Polonia Restituta.

Julian Ignacy Nowak was buried in Rakowicki Cemetery. He was the father of Olympic fencer Wanda Dubieńska.

Government offices
Preceded by Artur Śliwiński	Prime Minister of Poland; 1922	Succeeded by Władysław Sikorski
