= Jastrzębowo =

- Village
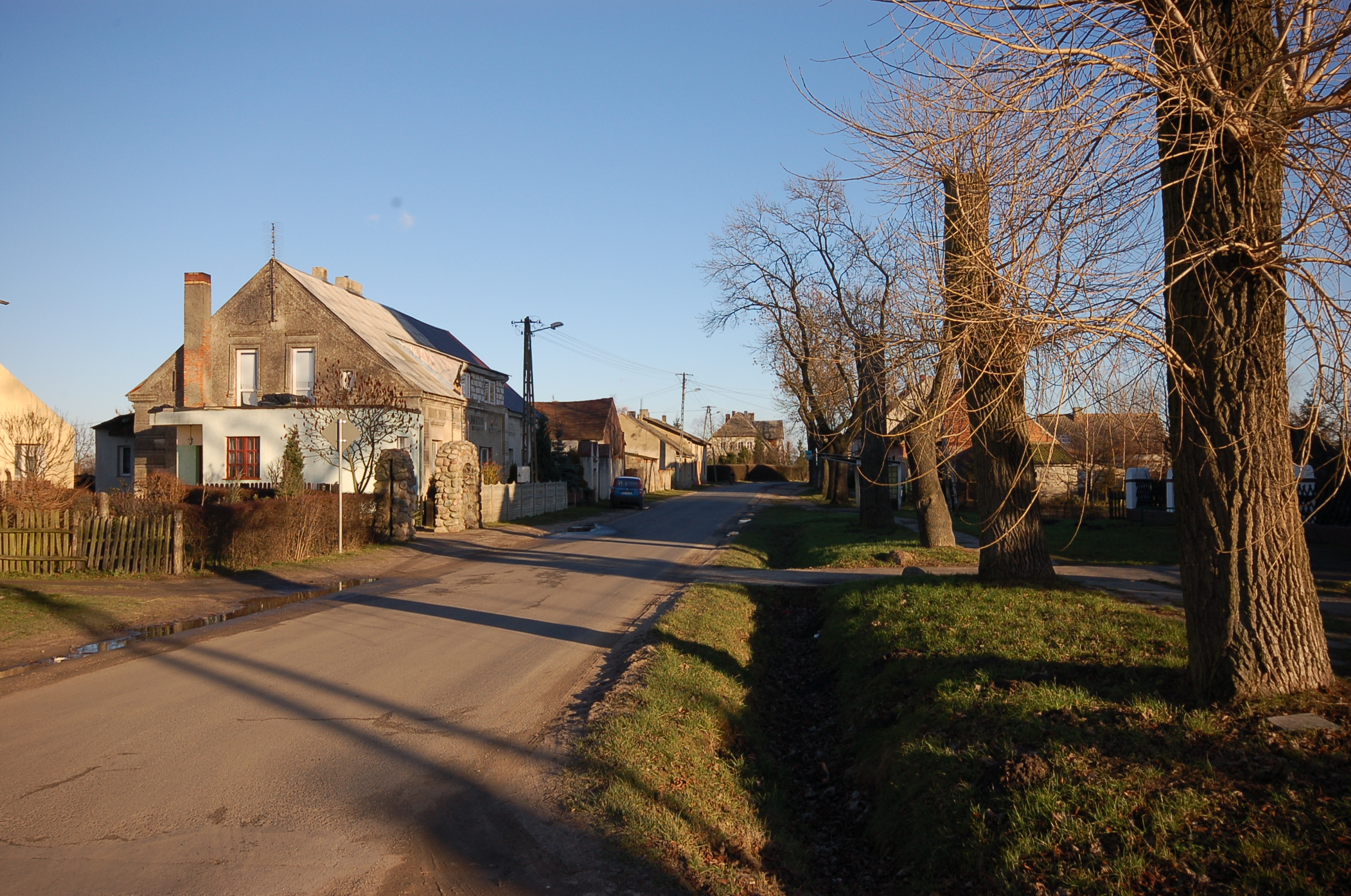
- Jastrzębowo

- Location within Poland
- Coordinates: 52°37′N 17°46′E
- Country: Poland
- Voivodeship: Greater Poland
- County: Gniezno
- Gmina: Trzemeszno

Jastrzębowo [jastʂɛmˈbɔvɔ] is a village in the administrative district of Gmina Trzemeszno, within Gniezno County, Greater Poland Voivodeship, in west-central Poland.
