= Artur Śliwiński =

8th Prime Minister of Poland

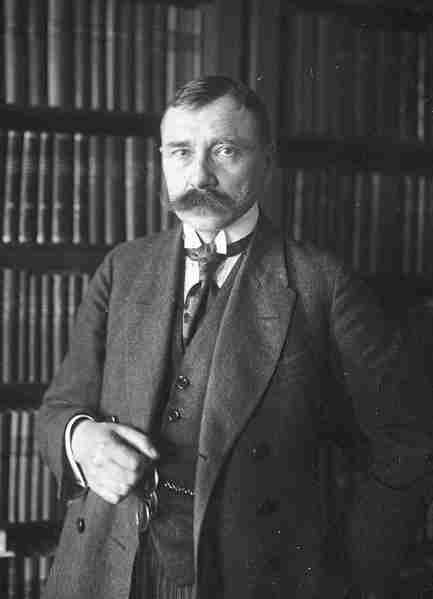
- Śliwiński c. 1920s

Prime Minister of Poland
- In office 28 June 1922 – 7 July 1922
- Chief of State: Józef Piłsudski
- Preceded by: Antoni Ponikowski
- Succeeded by: Julian Nowak

Personal details
- Born: 17 August 1877 Ruszki, Warsaw Governorate, Congress Poland
- Died: 16 January 1953 (aged 75) Warsaw, Poland
- Resting place: Powązki Cemetery
- Party: Polish Socialist Party
- Occupation: Politician, historian

Artur Śliwiński (Polish: [ˈartur ɕliˈviɲskʲi]; 17 August 1877 – 16 January 1953) was the 8th Prime Minister of Poland from 28 June – 7 July 1922. In 1915 he had presided over the National Central Committee, which sought Polish independence from partitioning powers.

Government offices
Preceded by Antoni Ponikowski	Prime Minister of Poland; 1922	Succeeded by Julian Nowak
