= Gniezno County =

Gniezno County Powiat gnieźnieński
- County
- Flag Coat of arms

- Location within the voivodeship
- Coordinates (Gniezno): 52°32′N 17°36′E
- Country: Poland
- Voivodeship: Greater Poland
- Seat: Gniezno
- Gminas: Total 10 (incl. 1 urban): Gniezno; Gmina Czerniejewo; Gmina Gniezno; Gmina Kiszkowo; Gmina Kłecko; Gmina Łubowo; Gmina Mieleszyn; Gmina Niechanowo; Gmina Trzemeszno; Gmina Witkowo

Area
  - Total: 1,254.34 km^{2} (484.30 sq mi)

Population (2006)
  - Total: 140,333
  - Density: 111.878/km^{2} (289.763/sq mi)
  - Urban: 90,957
  - Rural: 49,376
- Car plates: PGN
- Website: www.powiat-gniezno.pl

Gniezno County (Polish: powiat gnieźnieński) is a unit of territorial administration and local government (powiat) in Greater Poland Voivodeship, west-central Poland. It came into being on January 1, 1999, as a result of the Polish local government reforms passed in 1998. Its administrative seat and largest city is Gniezno, which lies 49 kilometres (30 mi) east of the regional capital Poznań. The county contains four other towns: Witkowo, 16 km (10 mi) south-east of Gniezno, Trzemeszno, 16 km (10 mi) east of Gniezno, Kłecko, 16 km (10 mi) north-west of Gniezno, and Czerniejewo, 14 km (9 mi) south-west of Gniezno.

The county covers an area of 1,254.34 square kilometres (484.3 sq mi). As of 2006 its total population is 140,333, out of which the population of Gniezno is 70,080, that of Witkowo is 7,855, that of Trzemeszno is 7,789, that of Kłecko is 2,677, that of Czerniejewo is 2,556, and the rural population is 49,376.

== Neighbouring counties ==
Gniezno County is bordered by Żnin County to the north, Mogilno County to the east, Słupca County to the south-east, Września County to the south, Poznań County to the west, and Wągrowiec County to the north-west.

== Administrative divisions ==
The county is subdivided into 10 gminas (one urban, four urban-rural and five rural). These are listed in the following table, in descending order of population.

Gmina	Type	Area (km^{2})	Population (2006)	Seat
Gniezno	urban	49.0	70,080	
Gmina Trzemeszno	urban-rural	174.8	14,019	Trzemeszno
Gmina Witkowo	urban-rural	184.4	13,446	Witkowo
Gmina Gniezno	rural	178.0	8,343	Gniezno *
Gmina Kłecko	urban-rural	131.7	7,569	Kłecko
Gmina Czerniejewo	urban-rural	112.0	6,913	Czerniejewo
Gmina Niechanowo	rural	105.3	5,395	Niechanowo
Gmina Łubowo	rural	113.4	5,344	Łubowo
Gmina Kiszkowo	rural	114.6	5,235	Kiszkowo
Gmina Mieleszyn	rural	99.2	3,989	Mieleszyn
* seat not part of the gmina
