= Trojanka (river) =

Trojanka (Goślinka)
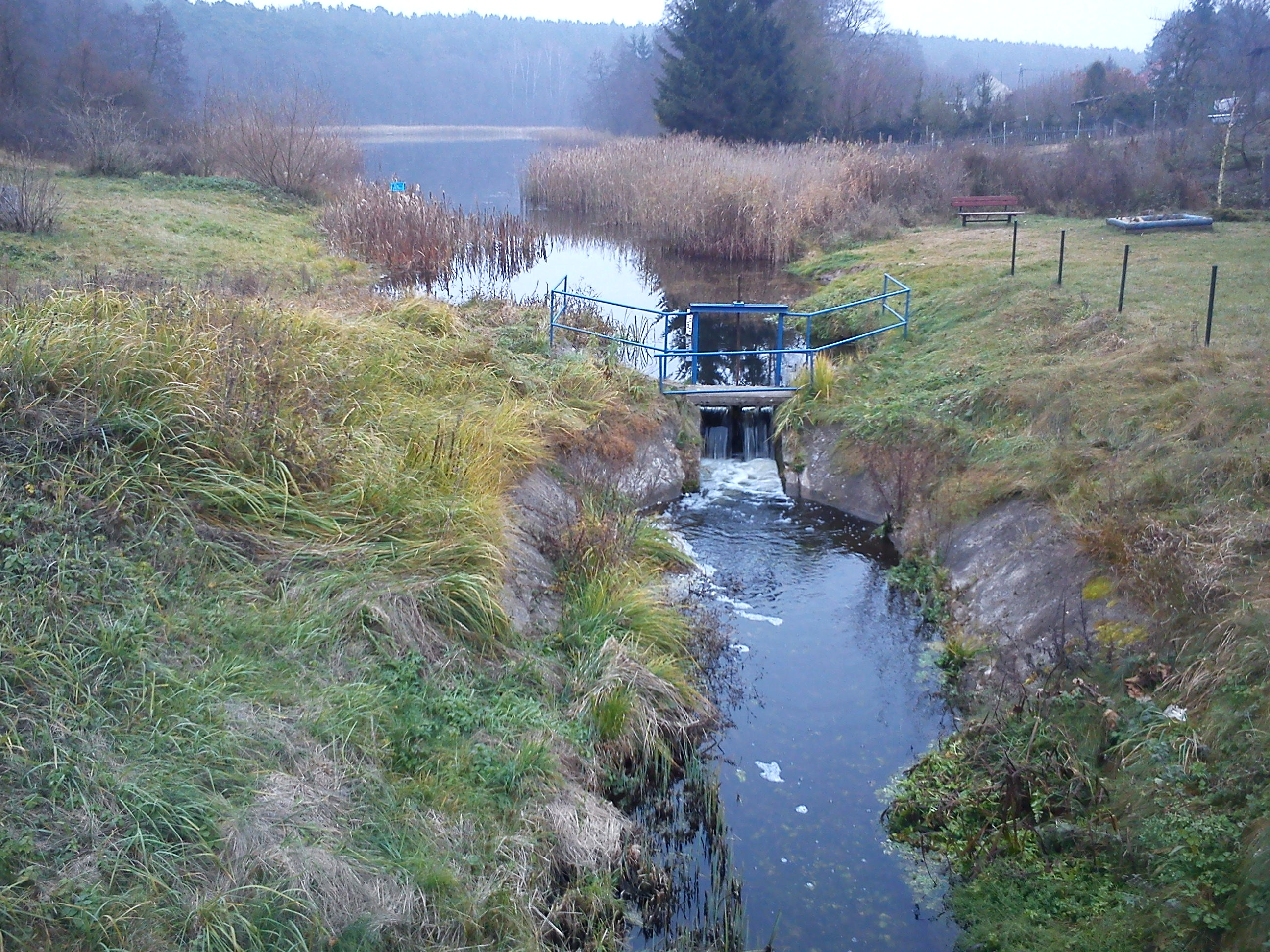

Physical characteristics
- Source
  - location: Puszcza Zielonka (Greater Poland)
  - elevation: 106 m (348 ft)
- Mouth
  - location: Mściszewo (confluence with the Warta)
  - coordinates: 52.5910°N 16.9508°E
  - elevation: 52 m (171 ft)
- Length: 20 km (12 mi)

Basin features
- Progression: Warta→ Oder→ Baltic Sea

The Trojanka [trɔˈjaŋka], also called Goślinka [ɡɔɕˈliŋka], is a stream, a right tributary of the Warta river, lying within the district of Gmina Murowana Goślina in Greater Poland Voivodeship, western Poland. It has a total length of approximately 20 kilometres (12 mi). It broadens into lakes at several places, and is joined by a number of smaller streams along its length.

The Trojanka rises in the middle of the Puszcza Zielonka forest, south of the village of Zielonka and close to the settlement of Huta Pusta. It initially flows northwards through Zielonka, where it broadens out into a lake, and to Głęboczek, where it again forms a small lake. It then flows north-westwards into a larger lake, Jezioro Leśne ("Forest Lake"), south-east of Łopuchówko. From there it flows west, forming another small lake at Głębocko, followed by the larger Jezioro Worowskie ("Worowo Lake" named after the settlement of Worowo to the north).

The stream then continues north-westwards, flowing out of the Puszcza Zielonka Landscape Park, and turns sharply southwards at the settlement of Brody south of Wojnowo. It flows through Trojanowo and Przebędowo (where it again forms a small lake), before running along the western side of the town of Murowana Goślina. At a point south-west of the older part of the town (but north of the newer Zielone Wzgórza estate) it again turns north-west, flowing into another lake at Raduszyn, and from there to the village of Mściszewo. It joins the river Warta a short distance to the north-west of Mściszewo. There was formerly a village called Goślinka (or Mała Goślina—"Little Goślina") close to this point, but this is now part of Mściszewo.
