= Rakownia =

- Village
- Location within Poland
- Coordinates: 52°34′N 17°2′E
- Country: Poland
- Voivodeship: Greater Poland
- County: Poznań
- Gmina: Murowana Goślina

Rakownia [raˈkɔvɲa] is a village in the administrative district of Gmina Murowana Goślina, within Poznań County, Greater Poland Voivodeship, in west-central Poland. It is situated on the road from Murowana Goślina to Kamińsko, at the edge of the Puszcza Zielonka forest and landscape park.
