= Głęboczek, Greater Poland Voivodeship =

Głęboczek
- Village
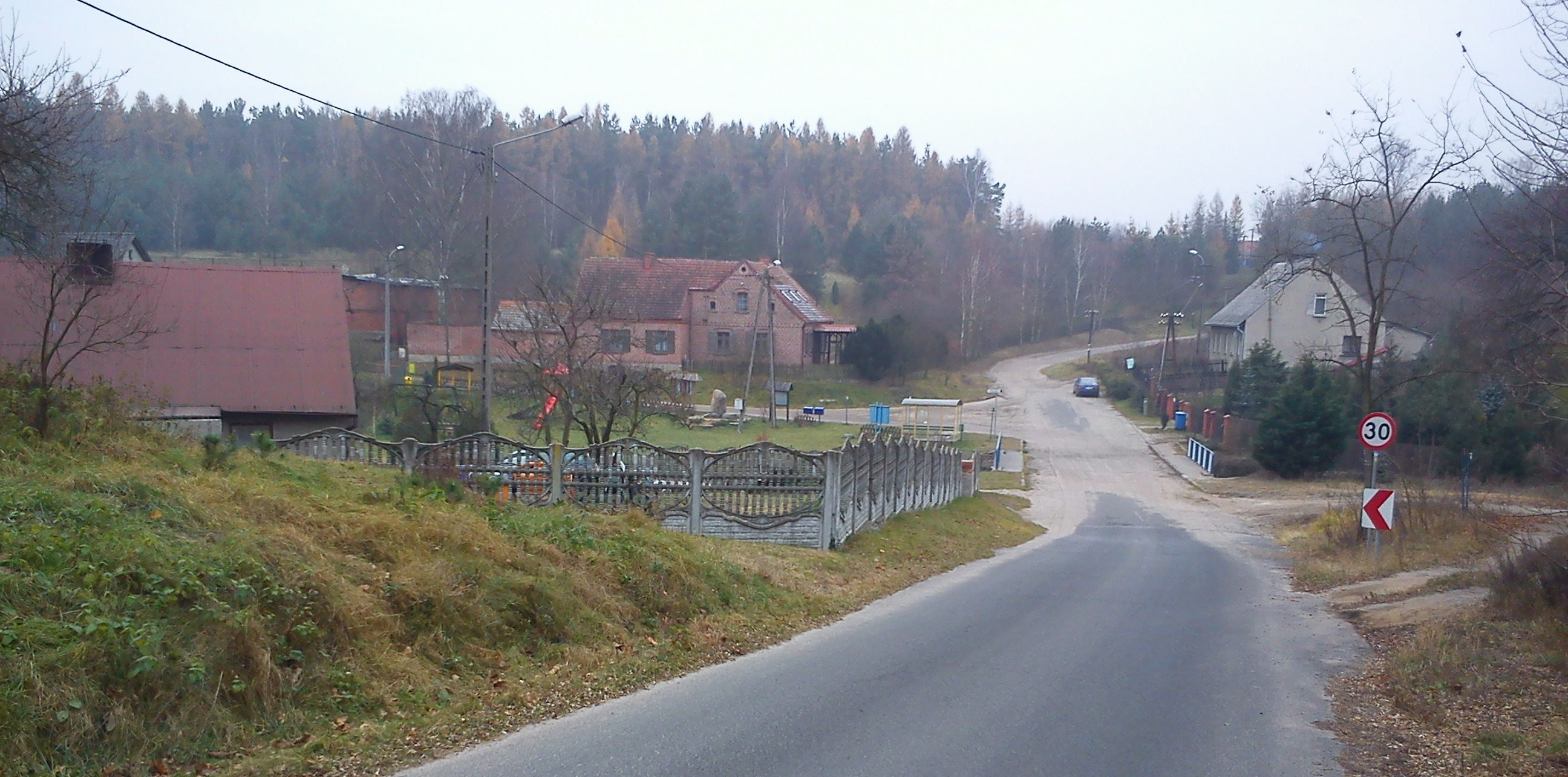
- Głęboczek

- Location within Poland
- Coordinates: 52°34′N 17°6′E
- Country: Poland
- Voivodeship: Greater Poland
- County: Poznań
- Gmina: Murowana Goślina
- Population (approx.): 90

Głęboczek [ɡwɛmˈbɔt͡ʂɛk] is a village and sołectwo in Gmina Murowana Goślina, Poznań County, Greater Poland Voivodeship, in western Poland. It is situated beside a small lake on the Trojanka stream, within the Puszcza Zielonka forest and landscape park.

In 1458 Głęboczek gained the status of a town, but by 1580 it was again called a village.

Just to the south-east of the village, close to the Trojanka (on a former island), is the site of a former fortified settlement, at which archeological work has been carried out. Early medieval ceramic artefacts have been found there.

At the northern end of the village is a pine tree, growing on a slope with its roots exposed, officially designated a natural monument. The remains of a former cemetery can be found close by.

Głęboczek formerly had a primary school (now houses, at the south-western end of the village). There are no public transport links apart from a school bus, which transports children to the schools in Łopuchowo and Murowana Goślina. The nearest bus and train services are in Murowana Goślina (7 km, with frequent bus connections with Poznań) and Łopuchowo (5 km). Głęboczek belongs to the Roman Catholic parish of Dąbrówka Kościelna.

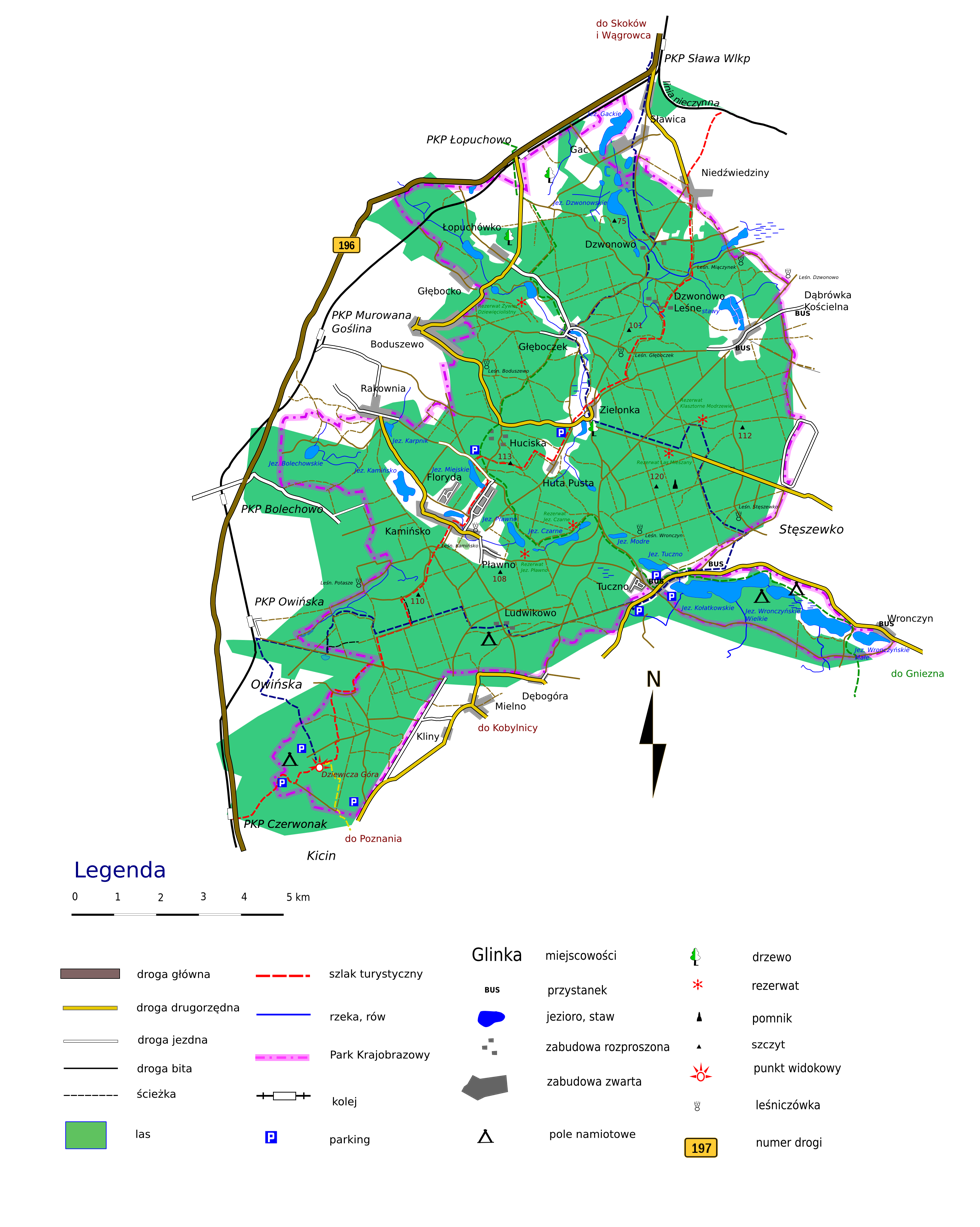
Głęboczek within the Puszcza Zielonka Landscape Park
