= Goślina =

Goślina may refer to the following places in Poland:

- Długa Goślina
- Murowana Goślina
