= Pławno, Greater Poland Voivodeship =

Pławno
- Village
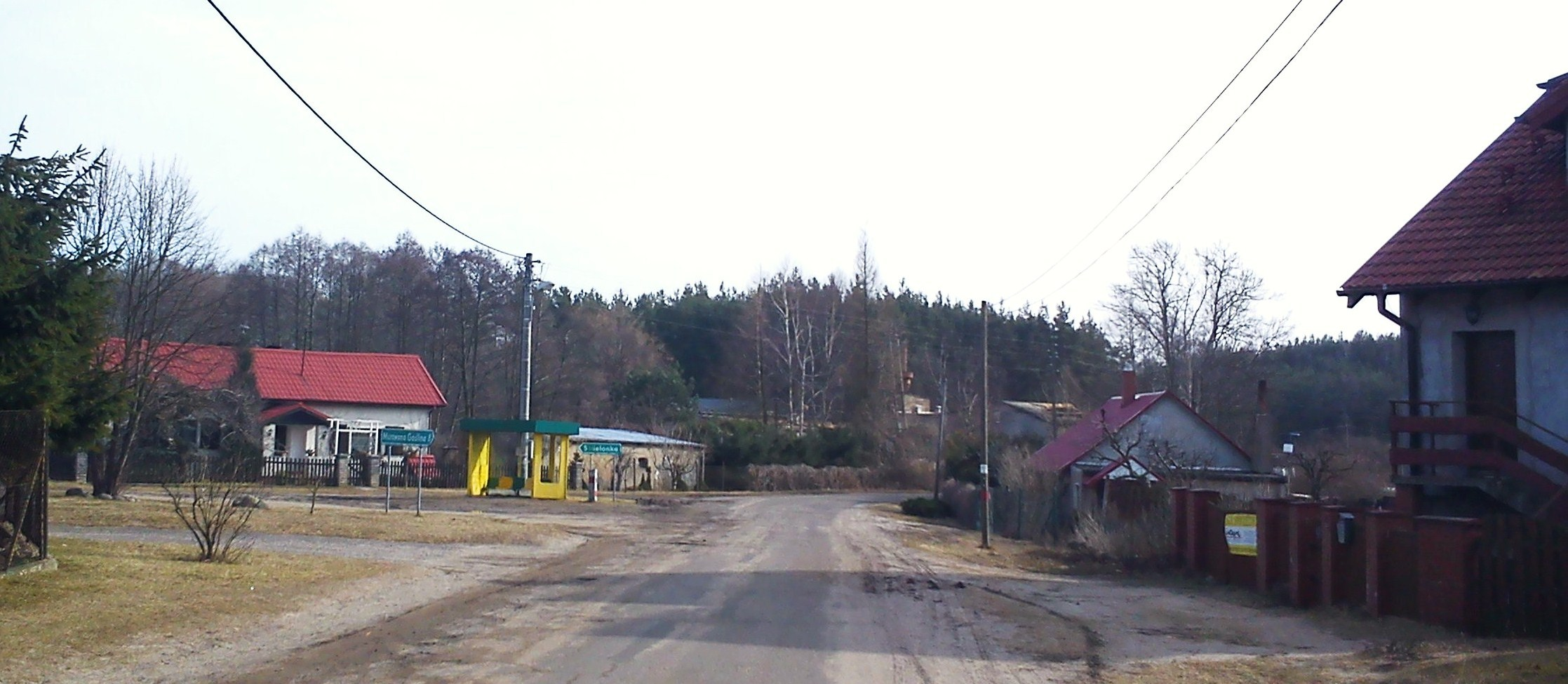
- Pławno

- Location within Poland
- Coordinates: 52°31′41″N 17°4′20″E
- Country: Poland
- Voivodeship: Greater Poland
- County: Poznań
- Gmina: Murowana Goślina
- Population: 75

Pławno [ˈpwavnɔ] is a village in the administrative district of Gmina Murowana Goślina, within Poznań County, Greater Poland Voivodeship, in west-central Poland.

Pławno is situated within the Puszcza Zielonka forest and landscape park. It lies to the east of the village of Kamińsko and belongs to Kamińsko sołectwo. Further to the east are a series of lakes and two nature reserves. It has an approximate population of 75.
