= Wojnówko =

Wojnówko may refer to:

- Wojnówko, Poznań County
- Wojnówko, Złotów County

== See also ==
- Wojnowo (disambiguation)
