= Zielonka, Poznań County =

Zielonka
- Village
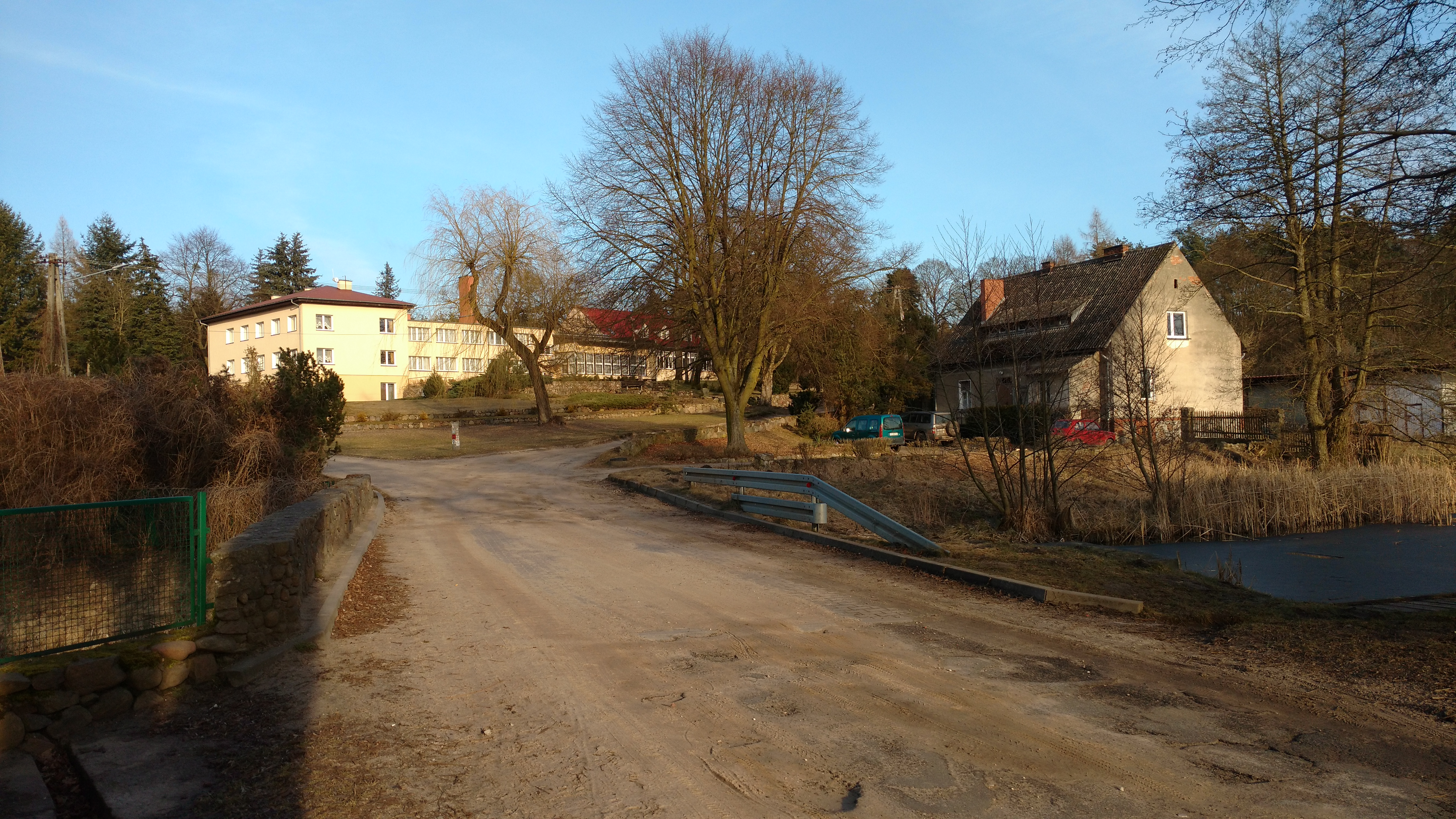
- Zielonka

- Location within Poland
- Coordinates: 52°33′N 17°7′E
- Country: Poland
- Voivodeship: Greater Poland
- County: Poznań
- Gmina: Murowana Goślina
- Population: 60

Zielonka [ʑɛˈlɔnka] is a village in the administrative district of Gmina Murowana Goślina, within Poznań County, Greater Poland Voivodeship, in west-central Poland. The village has an approximate population of 60.

Zielonka was first mentioned in written records in 1397. It is situated in the middle of the Puszcza Zielonka forest and landscape park. It has a small lake, from which the Trojanka stream flows northward towards Głęboczek.

The University of Life Sciences in Poznań has a research centre in the village. There is also an Arboretum covering 83 ha and featuring about 800 kinds of trees and shrubs. At the main entrance to the Arboretum stand two horse chestnut trees 420 and 330 cm in circumference, and an oak measuring 310 cm.

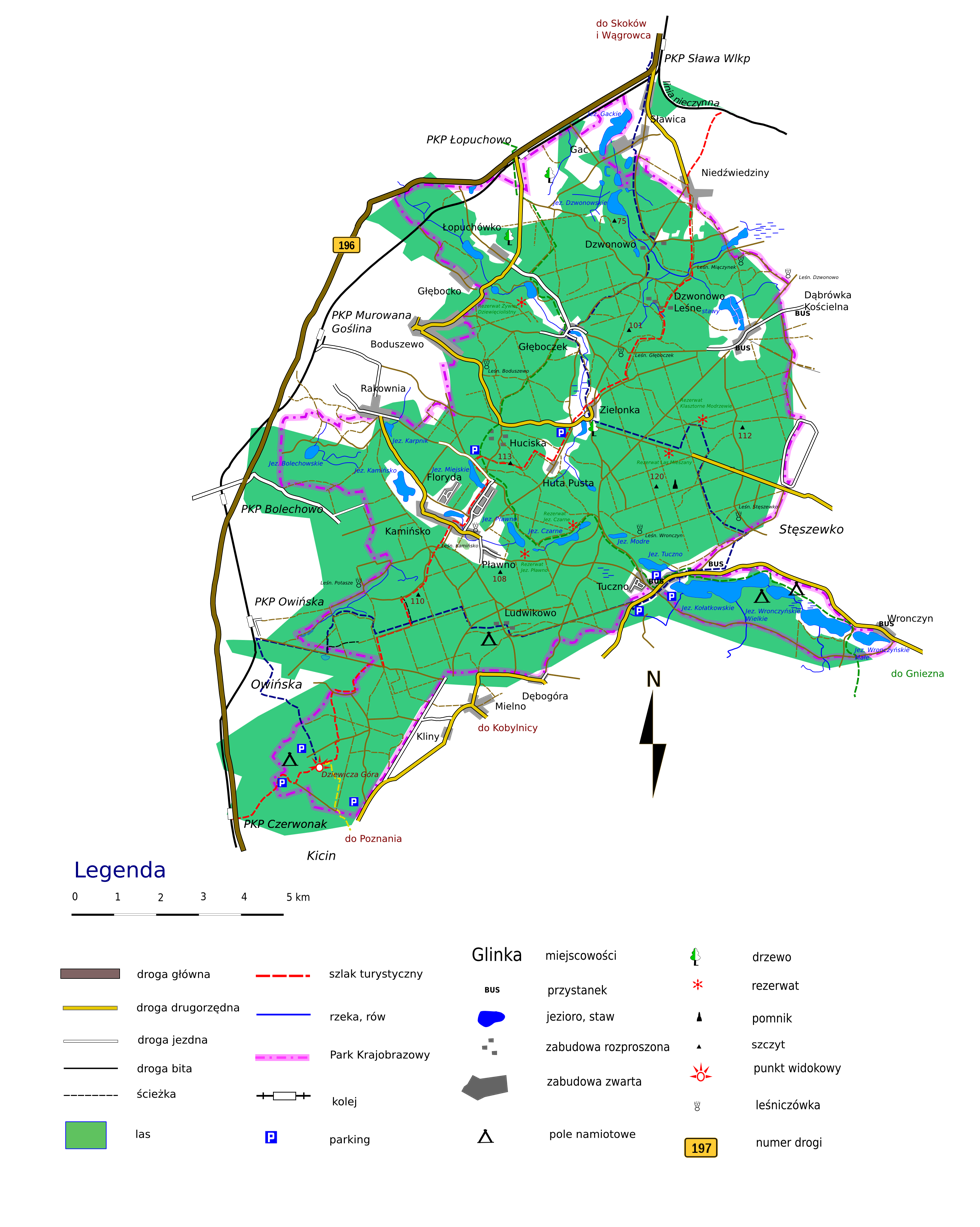
Zielonka within the Puszcza Zielonka Landscape Park
