= Głębocko, Greater Poland Voivodeship =

Głębocko
- Village
- Location within Poland
- Coordinates: 52°35′N 17°4′E
- Country: Poland
- Voivodeship: Greater Poland
- County: Poznań
- Gmina: Murowana Goślina
- Population: 80

Głębocko [ɡwɛmˈbɔt͡skɔ] is a village in the administrative district of Gmina Murowana Goślina, within Poznań County, Greater Poland Voivodeship, in west-central Poland.

The village has an approximate population of 80. It is situated near the western edge of the forests of the Puszcza Zielonka Landscape Park, close to a series of lakes on the Trojanka stream.
