= Białęgi =

Białęgi refers to the following places in Poland:

- Białęgi, Greater Poland Voivodeship
- Białęgi, West Pomeranian Voivodeship
