= Murowana Goślina =

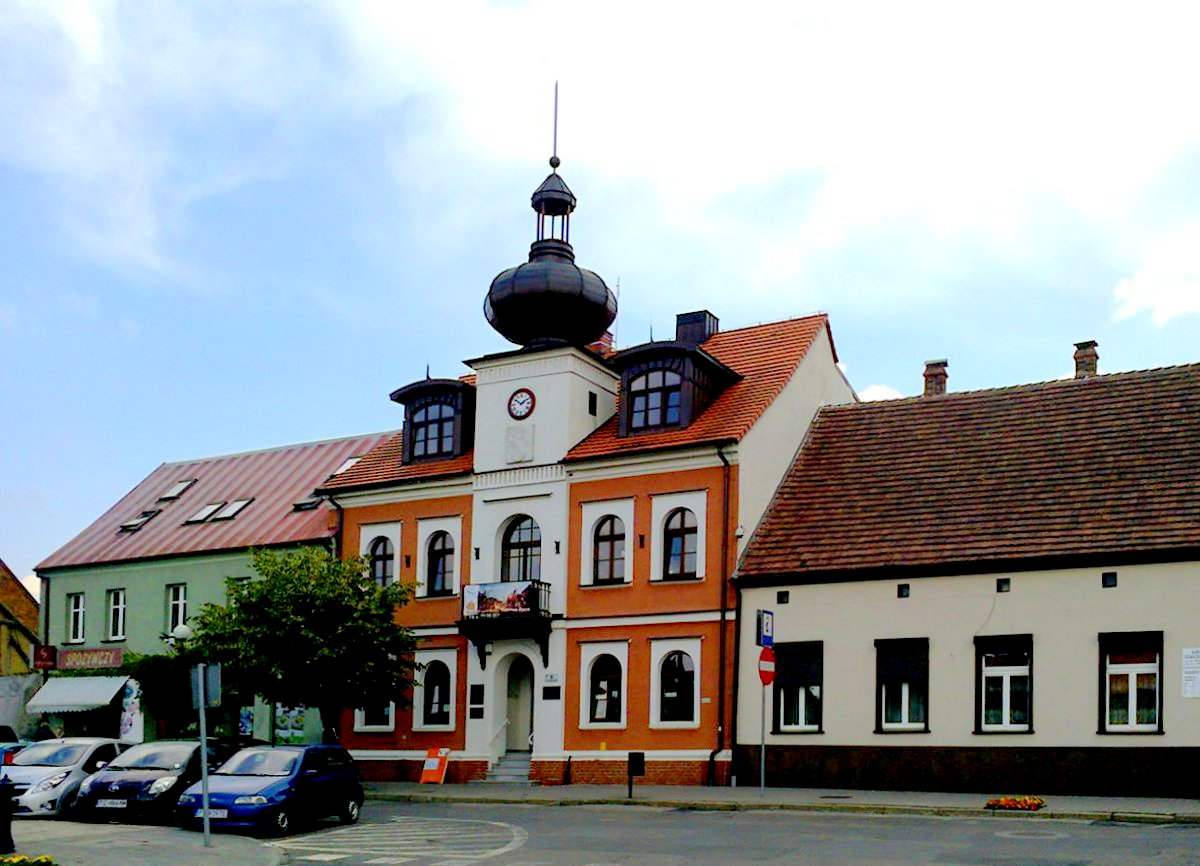
- Old town hall

- Flag Coat of arms

- Location within Poland
- Coordinates: 52°34′N 17°1′E
- Country: Poland
- Voivodeship: Greater Poland
- County: Poznań
- Gmina: Murowana Goślina
- First settled: 14th century

Government
  - Mayor: Justyna Radomska
- Area: 8.16 km^{2} (3.15 sq mi)
- Elevation: 75 m (246 ft)
- Population (2024): 10,287
  - Density: 1,260/km^{2} (3,270/sq mi)
- Time zone: UTC+1 (Central European Time)
  - Summer (DST): UTC+2 (Central European Summer Time)
- Postal code: 62-095
- Vehicle registration: POZ, PZ
- Climate: Cfb
- Website: http://www.murowana-goslina.pl

Murowana Goślina ([murɔˈvana ɡɔˈɕlʲina]) is a town in Poznań County in western Poland, with 10,287 inhabitants (2024). The Trojanka stream flows through northern and western parts of the town, reaching the river Warta a few kilometres to the west.

The town is divided into two main parts – the older part of the town to the north, centred on the market square and St. James' church, and the modern estate of Zielone Wzgórza to the south, consisting mainly of blocks of flats and houses built since 1983.

Murowana Goślina is also the seat of the municipality called Gmina Murowana Goślina, which has a total population of 16,864 (2019) and covers an area of 172 square kilometres (66 sq mi). The area around Murowana Goślina contains many lakes and forest areas, particularly within the protected area called Puszcza Zielonka Landscape Park. The region is popular with holiday-makers and day-trippers.

It is a member of Cittaslow.

== Name ==
In mediaeval times the settlement was called Górka (meaning "hill") – this name appears in chronicles from the reigns of Mieszko I and Bolesław the Brave in the late 10th and early 11th centuries. The later name Goślina was derived from the personal name Gostl (related to Polish gość, "guest"), which referred to a warrior from outside the region who was given the local estates as a reward for service to the state. When a church was built in the late 11th century, the place was referred to as Goślina Templi.

Around 1200, outside the wooden palisade around the wooden church, the ruling family erected a granite tower as a residence. It was this that gave rise to the name Murowana Goślina (murowana meaning "brick-built"), first attested in 1355. In the 13th century a large area on the right bank of the Warta around the Trojanka (then called Wełnianka) belonged to the Gostl family, and Murowana Goślina developed along a new trading route leading northwards from Poznań to Nakło.

In local colloquial speech the name of the town is normally shortened to just the prefix "Murowana". There is also a town called Długa Goślina ("Long Goślina") about 8 kilometres (5 miles) to the north.

== Geography ==
Murowana Goślina lies about 20 kilometres (12 mi) north of the major city of Poznań, on the main road and railway line between Poznań and Wągrowiec. The Trojanka stream (formerly also called Goślinka, Wełnianka or Czarna Wełna) flows through northern and western parts of the town, flowing into the river Warta a few kilometres to the west.

The municipal buildings, library and many shops are situated on or close to the old marketplace in the town centre, which also contains St. James' church (built 1605). However a large part of the town's population lives on the modern Zielone Wzgórza estate (with blocks of flats and houses built from 1983 onwards), which is located to the south of the old part of the town.

Murowana Goślina is also the seat of a municipality (gmina), called Gmina Murowana Goślina, which has a total population of 15,713 (2007) and covers an area of 172 square kilometres (66 sq mi). The area around Murowana Goślina contains many lakes and forest areas, including the Puszcza Zielonka forest, incorporated into the protected area called Puszcza Zielonka Landscape Park. The region is popular with holiday-makers and day-trippers, and there are a large number of summer vacation properties in the area.

== History ==
=== Early history ===
In the region around Murowana Goślina, there have been archeological finds dating from the Paleolithic (c. 8000 BC) and the Neolithic. In a triangle between Murowana Goślina, Długa Goślina and the Warta, early mediaeval treasure from the 10th and early 11th centuries has been found. The area lay on the ancient route from the early Polish capital Gniezno to western Pomerania via a crossing of the Warta at Radzim (near today's Starczanowo).

It is not known when Murowana Goślina received town rights, although it must have occurred before 1389, in the reign of Władysław Jagiełło. In that year there is a reference to the wójt Andrzej of Górka, and in 1391 there is also mentioned a local resident called Staszek. The town took over the function of a castellany from Radzim.

=== 17th and 18th centuries ===
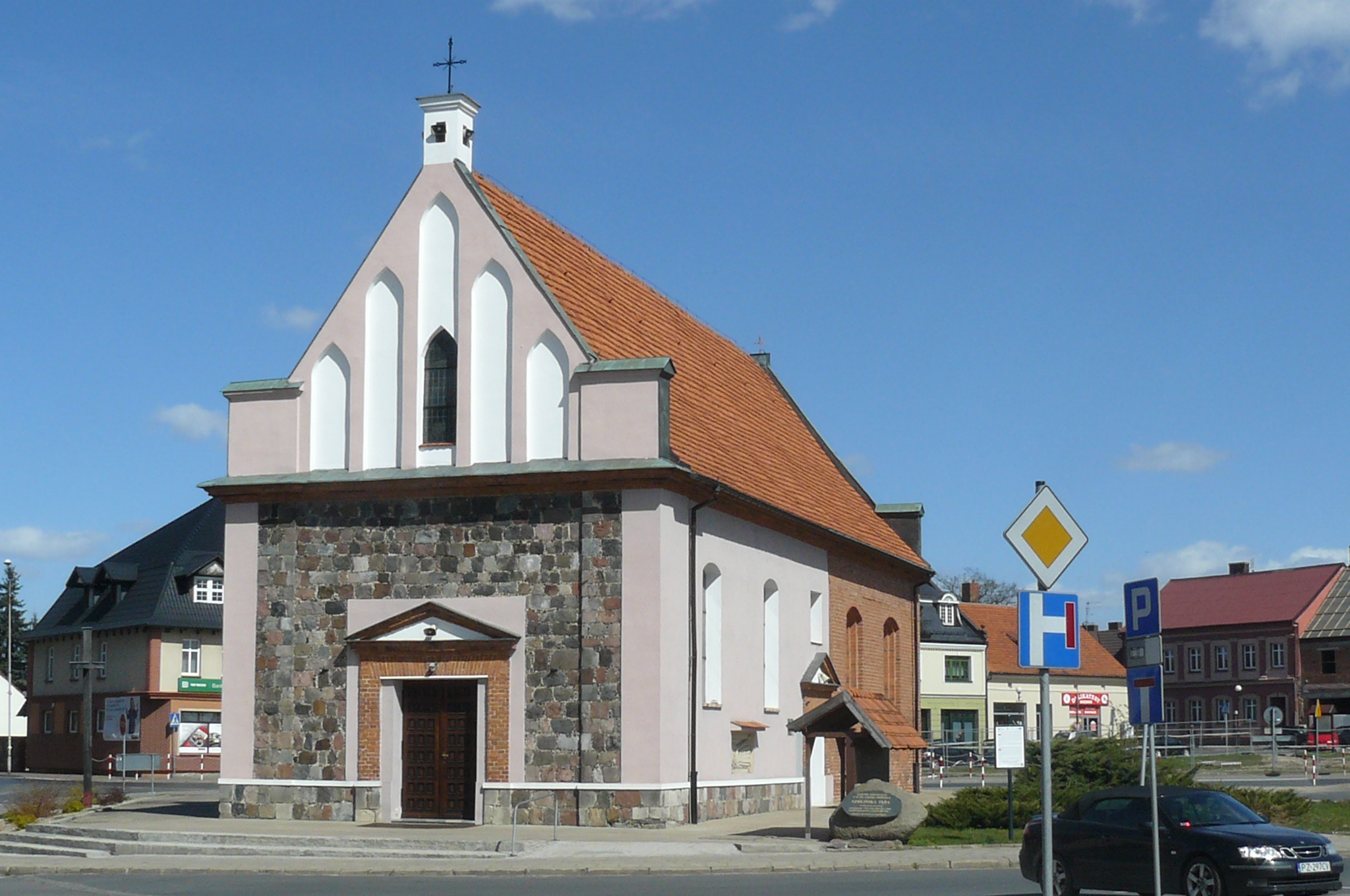
Saint James church

Murowana Goślina was a private town, and changed owners often. From 1593 it was owned by Jan Rozdrażewski, who granted privileges and a coat of arms – a blue shield with three rosettes on a silver diagonal stripe (an angel was added in the 18th century). In 1605 the old wooden church was replaced with a brick church with a single nave, built onto the two-storey rectangular tower. In 1651 the town was acquired by Jan Leszczyński, and his family held it until 1694. In 1724-1726 the priest, Filip Woliński, added a presbytery to the church in place of the earlier apse. The tower was by this time raised above the level of the church and contained bells. The town was struck by plague on many occasions, and was also devastated during the Swedish Wars.

In the 18th century, under the Gurowski family, the town prospered and many craftsmen were settled there. In 1736 Melchior Gurowski founded the village of Hamer (today's Raduszyn, just west of the town), where iron, paper and oil were made and grain ground. There were also Dutch settlements (olendry) around existing villages. In 1752 a new street, Zamkowa ("Castle Street"; now ul. Kochanowskiego) was laid out in the town and a school was opened. In 1763 a potters' guild received rights and privileges.

In 1782 Jews were allowed to live in the town. In 1785 king Stanisław August Poniatowski granted the town the right to hold fairs, and clothiers settled there. In 1793, with the Second Partition of Poland, the town came under Prussian rule. At that time it had a population of 903, with 99 houses. Most of the population was engaged in crafts and trade. The main street was paved, and on the Warta was a ferry belonging to the town owner. The town's name became Germanized as Murowana Goslin. Land and town was owned by the barons von Winterfeld.

=== 19th century ===
In 1784–1803 a Protestant church was built near the north-east corner of the market square, with a German school close to it. A Polish school would be built in the first half of the 19th century on Zamkowa (Kochanowskiego), opposite a medical centre. Catholic and Protestant cemeteries came to exist on hills on opposite sides of the road leading south to Poznań (the Catholic cemetery, on the western side, is still functional, but the Protestant cemetery on the eastern side is in a ruined state).

In 1807 Murowana Goślina became part of the powiat of Oborniki, within the Napoleonic Duchy of Warsaw. In 1815 the region returned to Prussia, as part of the Grand Duchy of Posen. A major fire of 1817 destroyed much of the town and led to many families moving elsewhere, although there were also new arrivals. Houses began to be built with adobe bricks, some of which can still be seen in the older buildings.

In 1830 reconstruction of the parish church began. The tower was taken down and the nave extended, and a sacristy was added. Later a small tower was added on the presbytery roof and a free-standing bell-tower was built. A wall with two gates was built around the church.

In 1841 the estate and town's lands were acquired by Hans Karol von Winterfeld. A mansion was built by the Winterfeld family in the town park (reconstructed in the second half of the century). The family existed there till 1945. In 1842 Murowana Goślina had 196 houses and 1554 residents. In the mid 19th century a fine town hall was built on the market square.

A synagogue had been built in the early 19th century, in the Jewish quarter of the town to the north of the market square, along ul. Rogozińska (formerly Bydgoska); the synagogue was on ul. Żydowska ("Jewish Street"), now ul. Szkolna ("School Street"). The building was renovated following a major fire in 1847. It was also used as a school for Jewish children. There was also a Jewish cemetery to the south-west of the town, on the road to Mściszewo (on the hill on which the Middle School now stands). Both the synagogue and cemetery were later destroyed during the Nazi occupation.

In the Greater Poland Uprising and Spring of Nations events of 1848, a rebel force consisting of peasants and townspeople blocked communications with northern Greater Poland.

The economy of the towndeveloped in the second half of the century, thanks to its location on a route northwards from Poznań. Various institutions were formed, including a people's bank (Bank Ludowy) in 1873, a volunteer fire brigade in 1888, craft guilds which formed the Industrialists' Society (Towarzystwa Przemysłowców) in 1904, and an agricultural organization (Kółko Rolnicze) in 1905. A public library was also founded. A larger Polish school building was erected on ul. Szkolna in 1897.

=== 20th century ===
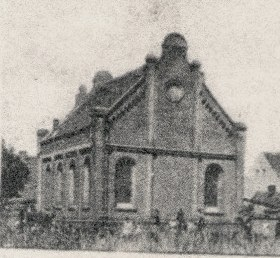
The synagogue, destroyed under Nazi German occupation

In 1901 the town had a population of 1,513, of whom 982 were classed as Polish, 427 as German and 104 as Jewish.

In 1905 the railway line to Poznań, passing through Murowana Goślina, was opened (by 1908 it extended northwards to Wągrowiec). A station was built, as well as a road bridge linking the town centre with settlements east of the railway, called Piła Wieś (the district of the town around ul. Wodna was called Piła Miasto, and the mansion – which before the First World War was used as a customs office – appeared on some postcards as Schloss Pila). The new railway was visited twice by German Emperor Wilhelm II.

In 1902–1903, gas pipes were laid in the town, and in 1935 electricity was introduced. The gasworks was close to the junction of ul. Poznańska and ul. Wojska Polskiego (formerly ul. Półwiejska). Near to this was the imperial post office building (still standing). In 1907 the soldiers of the German imperial army appeared in the town and on the market square while carrying out manoeuvres in the Poznań area.

The town's development was slowed by the First World War and the Greater Poland Uprising of 1918–1919, in which many inhabitants were involved. Rebuilding of the town in the post-war independent Poland was slow. Among organizations founded were the Concordia sports club in 1921, and a church choir in 1926. The vtown's population grew from 1,595 in 1921 to 2,482 in 1931 and 2,800 in 1933 (2,417 Poles, 337 Germans, 16 Jews). Many of the German population (including Jews) emigrated to Germany in the interwar years. Germans accounted for 14% of the population of the town in the 1930s, and the number of Jewish families had fallen from 18 to two by 1939.

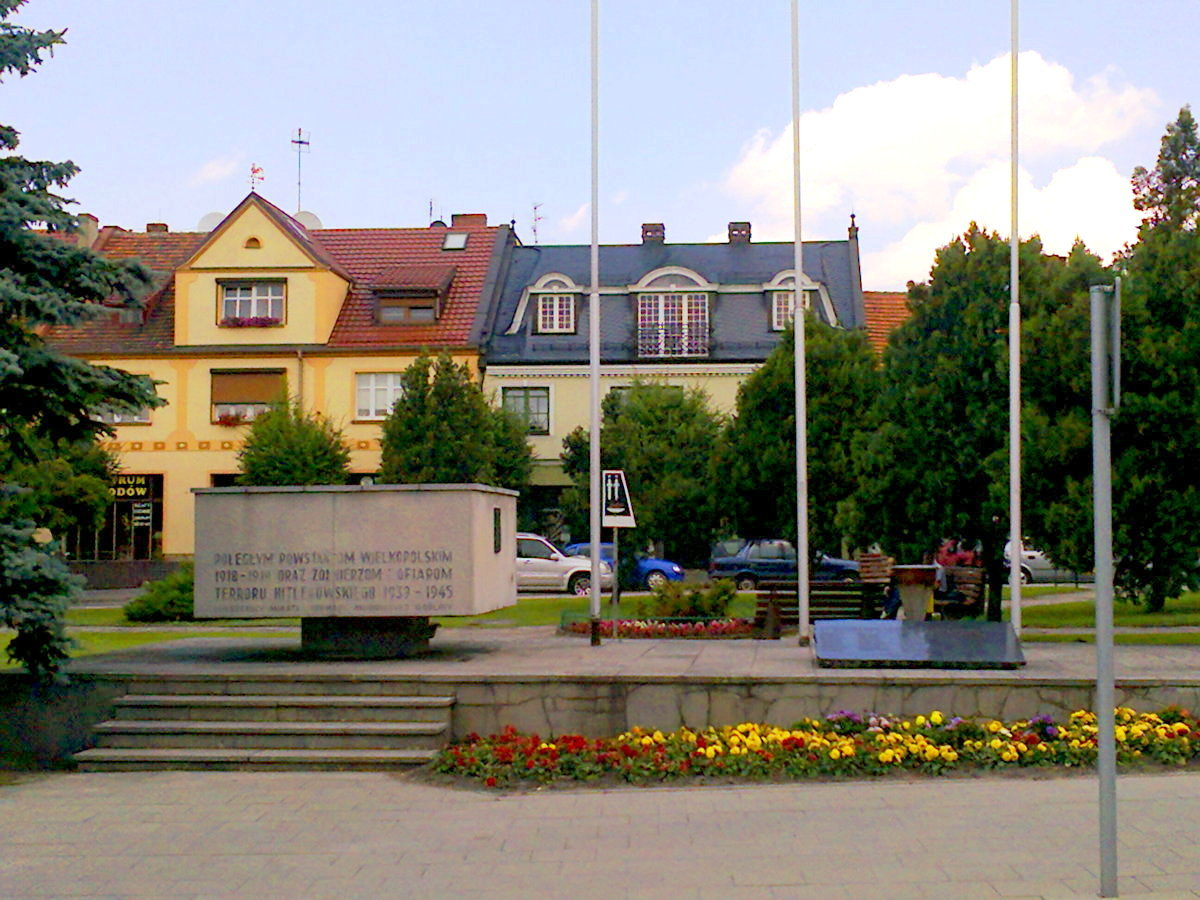
War memorial

In September 1939, following the German invasion of Poland, a resistance squadron of 40 armed volunteers forced a German patrol to retreat and fired on German engineers repairing a bridge over the Warta. In the first months of the war, 14 citizens of Murowana Goślina were executed, and 85 were taken to concentration camps, of whom 54 did not return. Also 45 soldiers were killed in fighting, four people died in the Katyń massacre, and many families were displaced.

=== Since the Second World War ===
The town was liberated on 21 January 1945, and on 23 January a civic militia (Milicja Obywatelska) was formed. The retreating Germans burnt down the railway station, the interwar post office at the junction of ul. Rogozińska and ul. Młyńska, and the occupiers' administrative building (Amtskomissariat) on the north side of the market square. Also destroyed by the occupiers during the war were the wall around the church, the church bell-tower, and the figures of the Madonna and Child, St. John Nepomucen and St. Laurence. For the next 44 years the town would be part of the communist Polish People's Republic. Its population in 1945 was 2,482 (compared with 2,700 in 1939); this increased to 4,399 by 1975, and this figure would more than double in subsequent years, particularly due to the building of the Zielone Wzgórza estate. In 2009 the town's official population was 10,336.

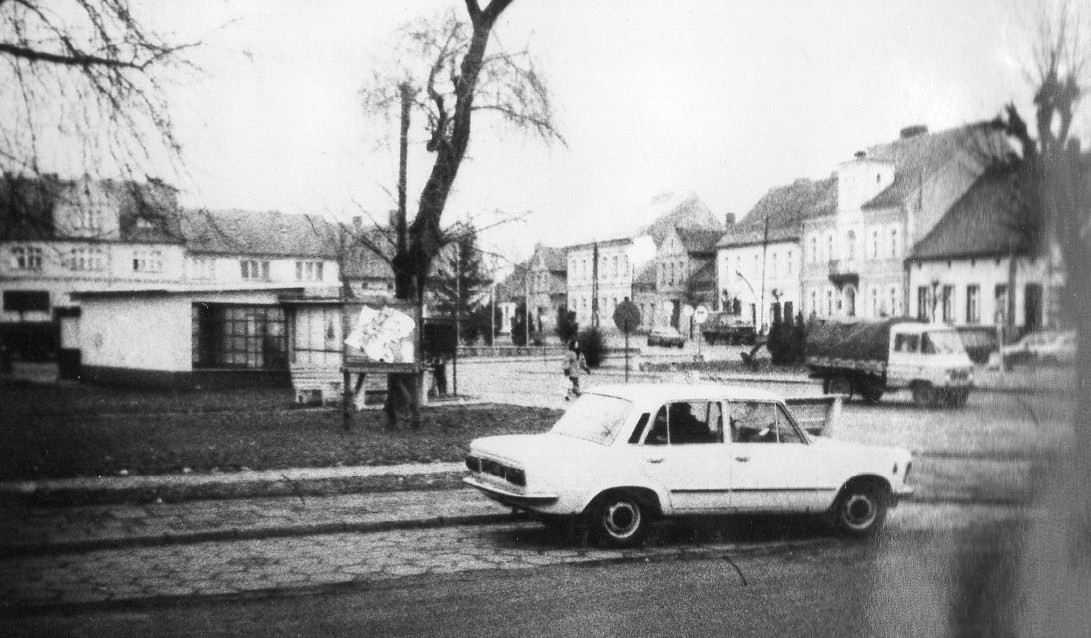
Rynek (Market Square) in 1991

The Zielone Wzgórza ("green gables") estate to the south of the old town was built under the auspices of a housing cooperative set up originally to provide homes for employees of the Cegielski factory (later "Pressta") in Bolechowo, a short distance to the south. It was planned to provide housing for 6000 people, mainly in blocks of flats. The first buildings were begun in 1983 and completed in 1986, and a primary school on the estate was completed in 1988. A church was built starting in 1990 and completed in 1993, becoming the parish church of Jesus Christ the Highest Archchaplain (Najwyższego Arcykapłana Jezusa Chrystusa). Also in 1990 a public library was opened on the estate. With the factory experiencing financial difficulties, the housing cooperative separated from the company in 1992, under the name Spółdzielnia Mieszkaniowa "Zielone Wzgórza". Around the year 2000, groups of houses began to be built in addition to blocks. From 2006 the older blocks have been renovated, with thermal insulation added.

In February 2006 the town council passed a resolution dividing the town into 12 districts (each called an osiedle), with elected executives having certain limited powers and budget.

== Monuments and attractions ==
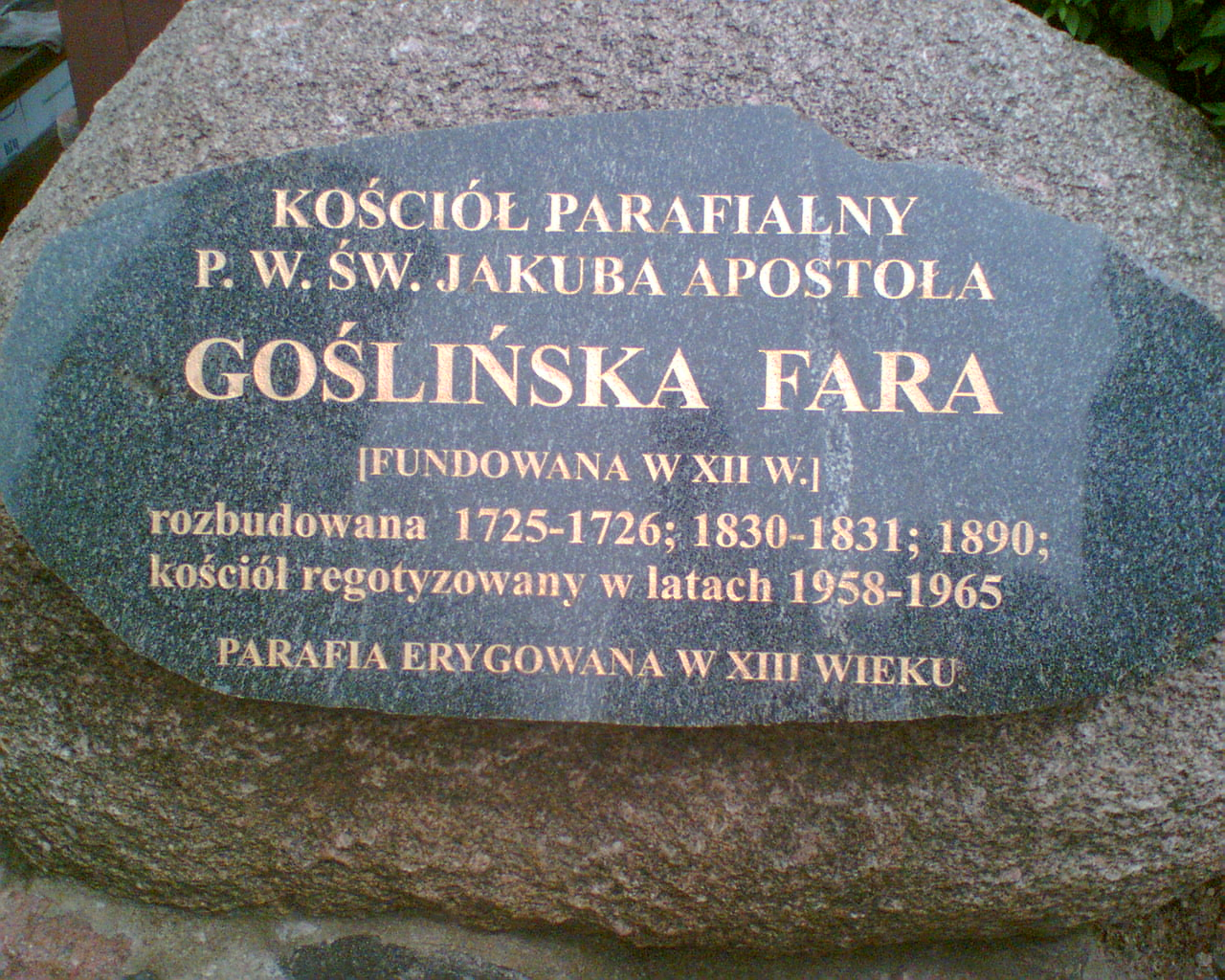
Plaque by St. James' Church

Historic buildings and other sites of interest in Murowana Goślina include:

- St. James' Church (see above).
- Church of the Holy Spirit, built in 1784–1803 in Classical style as a Protestant church, now used as an auxiliary church by the Roman Catholic parish.
- Winterfelds' Palace in the park south of the town and district offices (see above). The park contains a 700-year-old yew tree with five trunks.
- Regional Museum in the town library, located in the old town hall on the market square.
- Late 19th-century building at ul. Rogozińska 33, formerly an inn (Cohn's Gasthof).
- 19th-century building at ul. Poznańska 34, formerly the Hotel de Posen with adjoining concert hall.
- Pre-World War I half-timbered villa at ul. Poznańska 28.
- An old lime tree, classed as a natural monument, near the Concordia stadium on ul. Mściszewska.

The Wielkopolska section of the Way of St. James passes through Murowana Goślina towards Poznań, part of the pilgrimage route to the tomb of St. James in Santiago de Compostela, Spain.

== Education ==
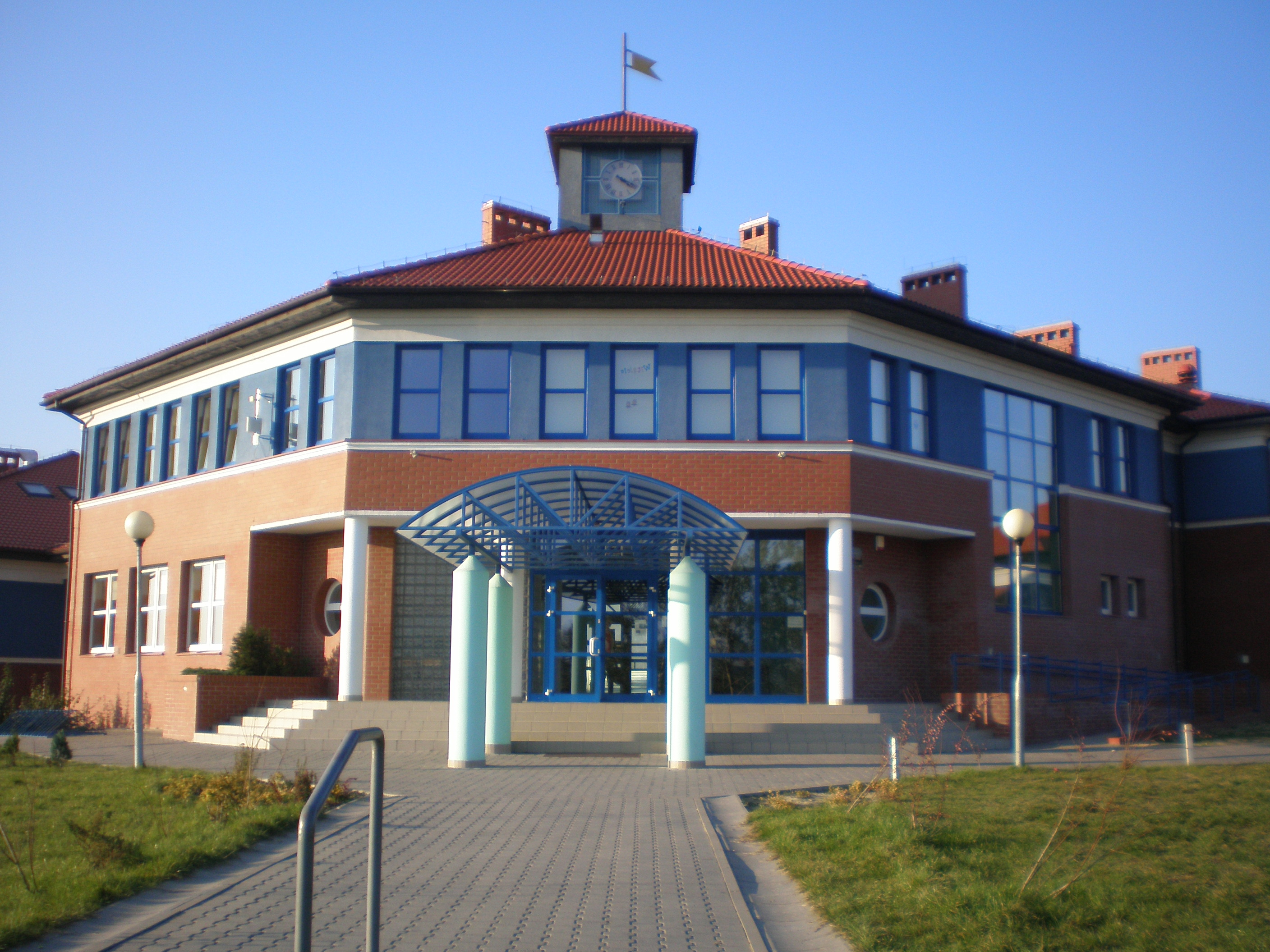
Gimnazjum no. 1

The town has two primary schools, the first on ul. Szkolna north of the old town centre, and the second on Zielone Wzgórza (opened 1992, patron Henryk Sienkiewicz). Since the educational reforms of 2001 it has also had two middle schools (gimnazjum), the first a newly built site south of the old centre (on the hill which formerly contained the Jewish cemetery), and the second housed in the same building as the primary school on Zielone Wzgórza (patron Jan Kochanowski). There is also a school providing higher-level education, housed in the older school building on ul. Szkolna.

== Transport ==
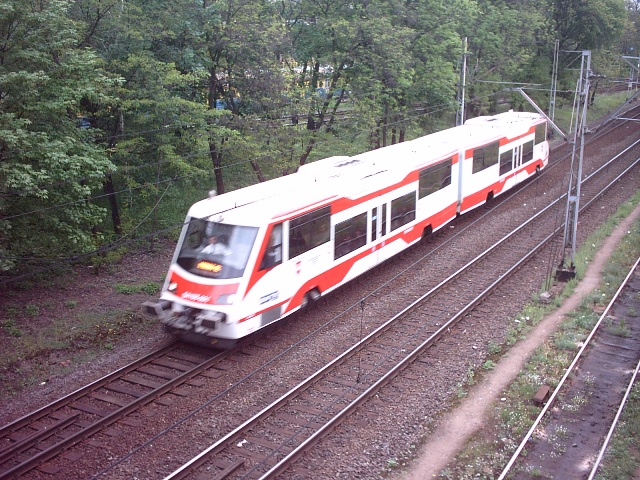
An SA108 railcar passing through Murowana Goślina

Regular bus lines run from Przebędowo on the northern edge of the town, through central Murowana Goślina and the Zielone Wzgórza estate to Poznań. PKS and KSK coaches also run through the town, and there are local buses running to some of the villages within the gmina. The rail connection with Wągrowiec and Poznań is served mainly by railcars.

== Notable residents ==
- Eugen Ernst (1864–1954), German politician
- Erna Denera (1881–1938), German operatic soprano
- Witold Czarnecki (born 1953), Polish politician

== Twin towns ==
Murowana Goślina is twinned with the town of Hemmingen in Lower Saxony, Germany, and also has a partnership arrangement with Ochotnica Dolna in southern Poland. As of July 2010 it is also twinned with Yvetot in Normandy, France.
