= Wojnowo, Greater Poland Voivodeship =

Wojnowo
- Village
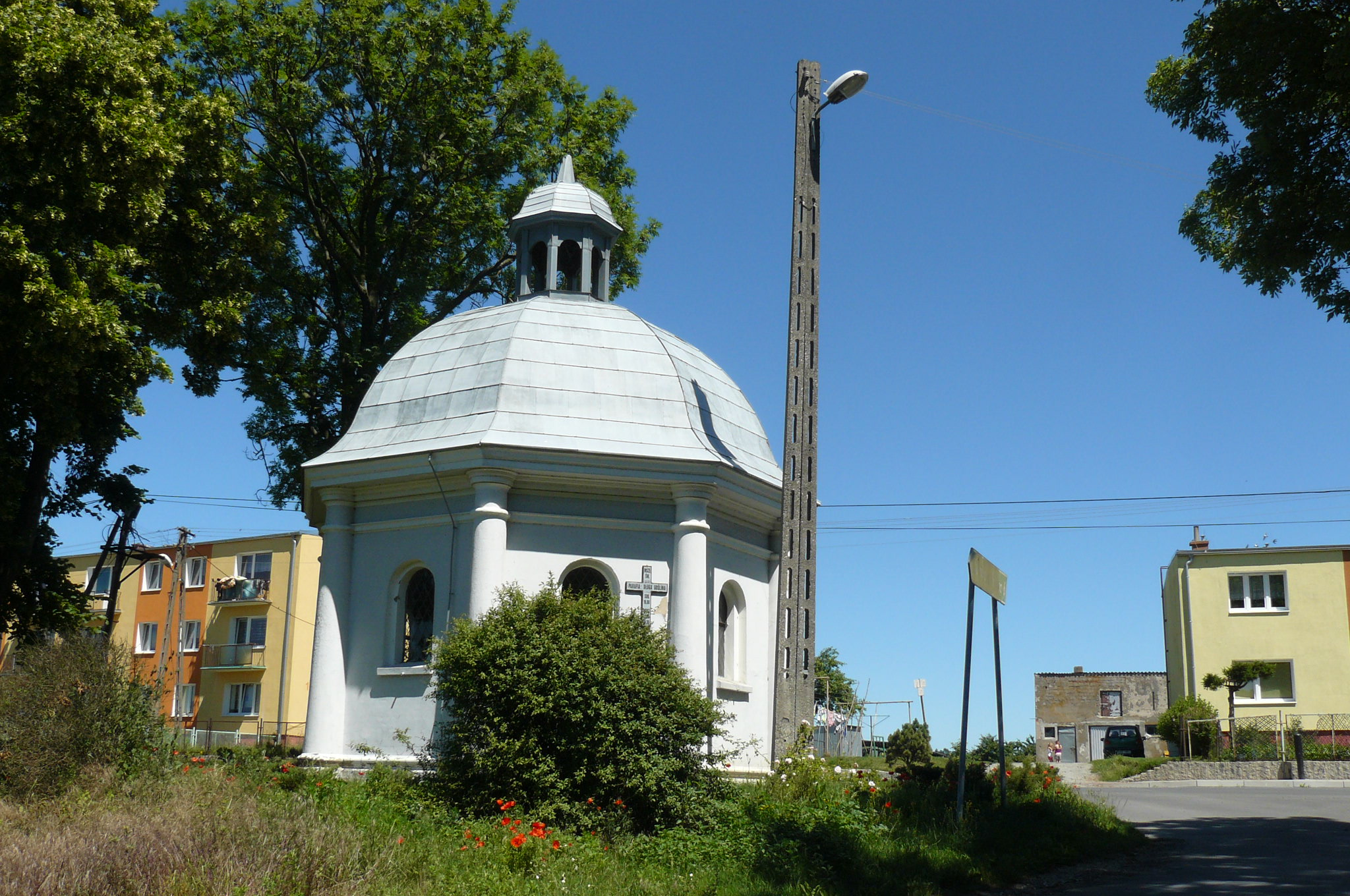

- Location within Poland
- Coordinates: 52°37′17″N 17°2′56″E
- Country: Poland
- Voivodeship: Greater Poland
- County: Poznań
- Gmina: Murowana Goślina
- Population: 387

Wojnowo [vɔi̯ˈnɔvɔ] is a village in the administrative district of Gmina Murowana Goślina, within Poznań County, Greater Poland Voivodeship, in west-central Poland. In 2004 it had a population of 387. It was first mentioned in written records in 1325.

Wojnowo is situated close to Lake Wojnowskie, between Długa Goślina and Łopuchowo. It has a palace, built in 1836 in neo-Renaissance style, set in 5 hectares of grounds (in private ownership). There is also a chapel, and a mile-long avenue of lime trees (along the road to Łopuchowo). A collective farm operated during the communist era, but many of its buildings are now in disrepair. There was also formerly a distillery in the village.

About 2 km to the north-east lies the village of Wojnówko, which consists largely of a complex of vacation properties on the banks of Lake Łomno.
