= Boduszewo =

- Village
- Location within Poland
- Coordinates: 52°35′N 17°3′E
- Country: Poland
- Voivodeship: Greater Poland
- County: Poznań
- Gmina: Murowana Goślina
- Population: 240

Boduszewo [bɔduˈʂɛvɔ] is a village in the administrative district of Gmina Murowana Goślina, within Poznań County, Greater Poland Voivodeship, in west-central Poland. It is close to the edge of the forests of the Puszcza Zielonka Landscape Park.

The village has a 19th-century palace that hosts an annual local fair (Targ Wiejski).
