= Uchorowo =

- Village
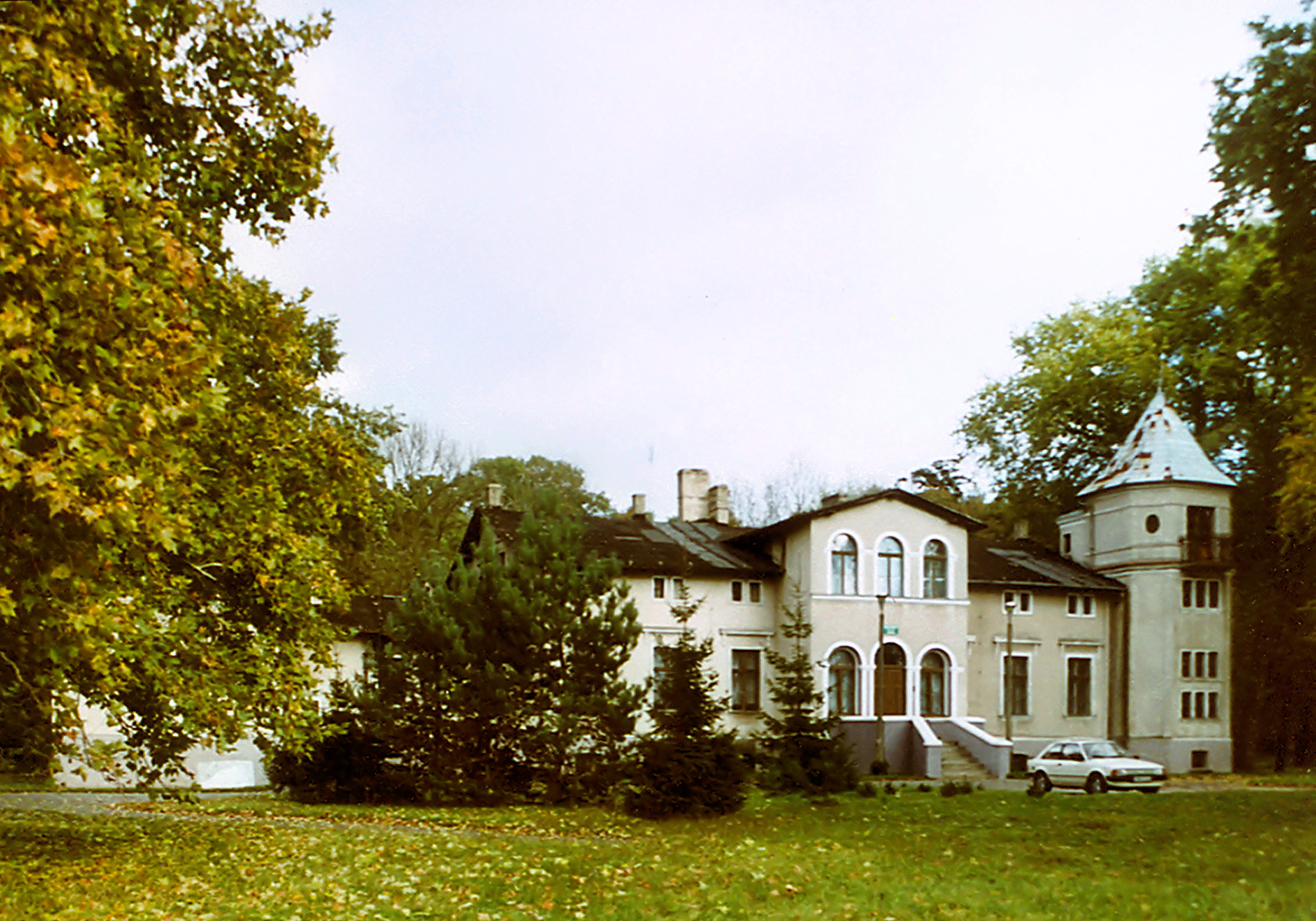
- Manor house in Uchorowo

- Location within Poland
- Coordinates: 52°39′N 16°57′E
- Country: Poland
- Voivodeship: Greater Poland
- County: Poznań
- Gmina: Murowana Goślina
- Population: 520

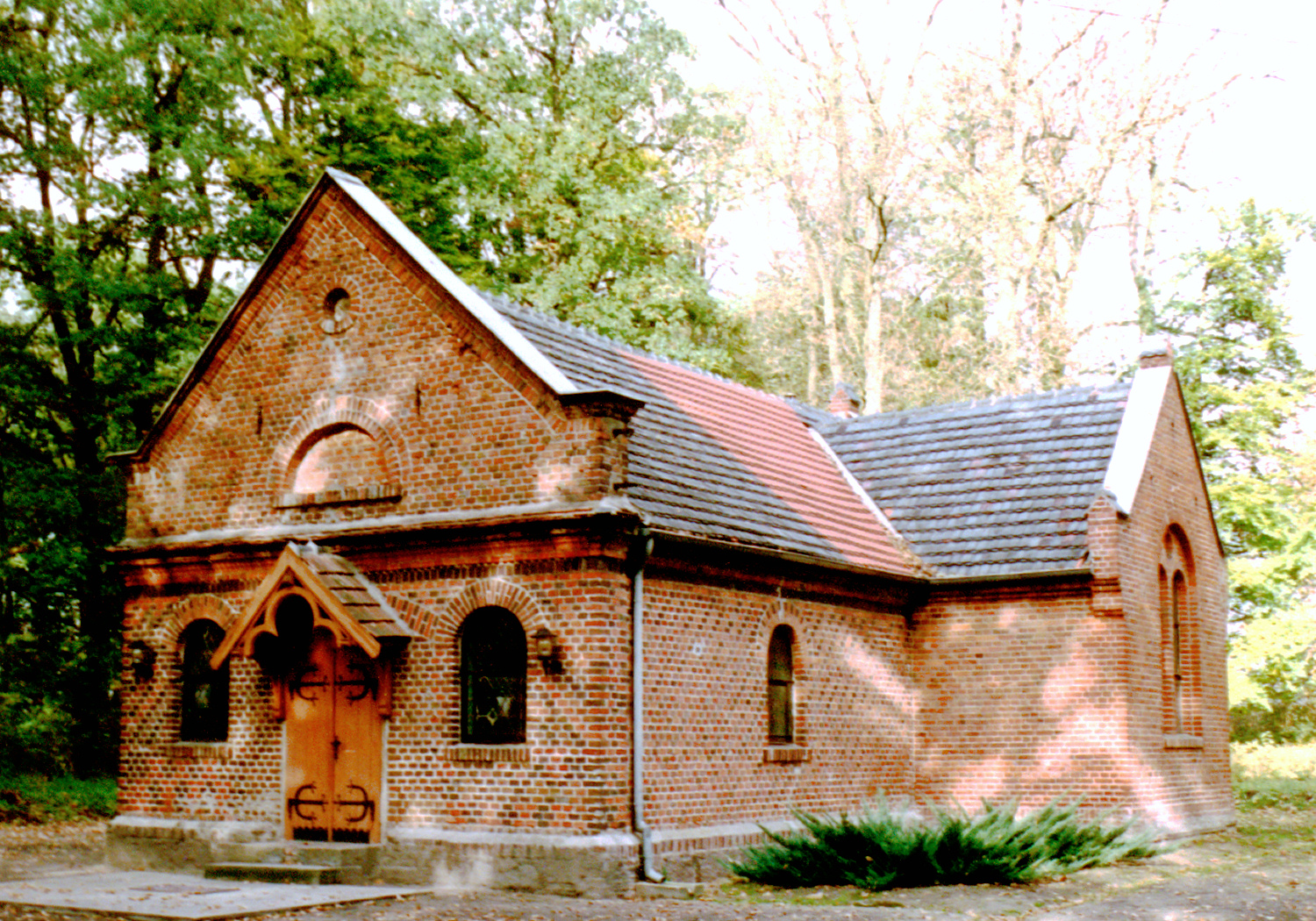
Chapel

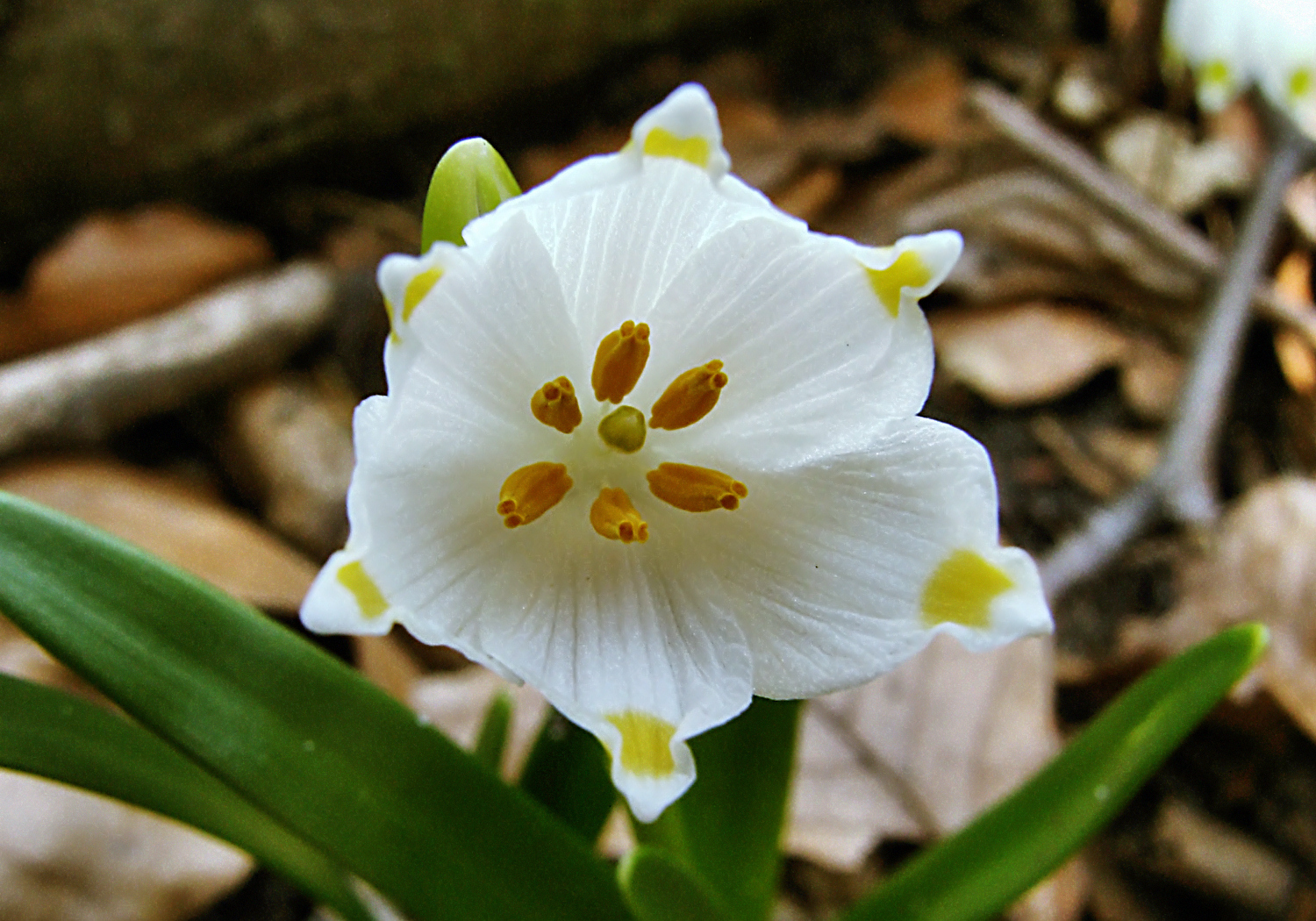
Spring snowflake (Leucojum vernum)

Uchorowo [uxɔˈrɔvɔ] is a village in the administrative district of Gmina Murowana Goślina, within Poznań County, Greater Poland Voivodeship, in west-central Poland.

Uchorowo was first mentioned in written records in 1388. It has a 19th-century manor house (last restored in 1987), and a neo-Gothic chapel dating from 1890. The village formerly had a parish church and a primary school.

About 3 km south-west of Uchorowo, past the hamlet of Szymankowo, is the Śnieżycowy Jar nature reserve, founded in 1975 and now covering 9 hectares. It is most notable for the large numbers of spring snowflakes (Leucojum vernum) which bloom in March. This is one of the few places where this flower is found in lowland Poland. It is thought to have been brought here by human intervention in the 19th century.
