= Witold Czarnecki =

Polish politician (born 1953)

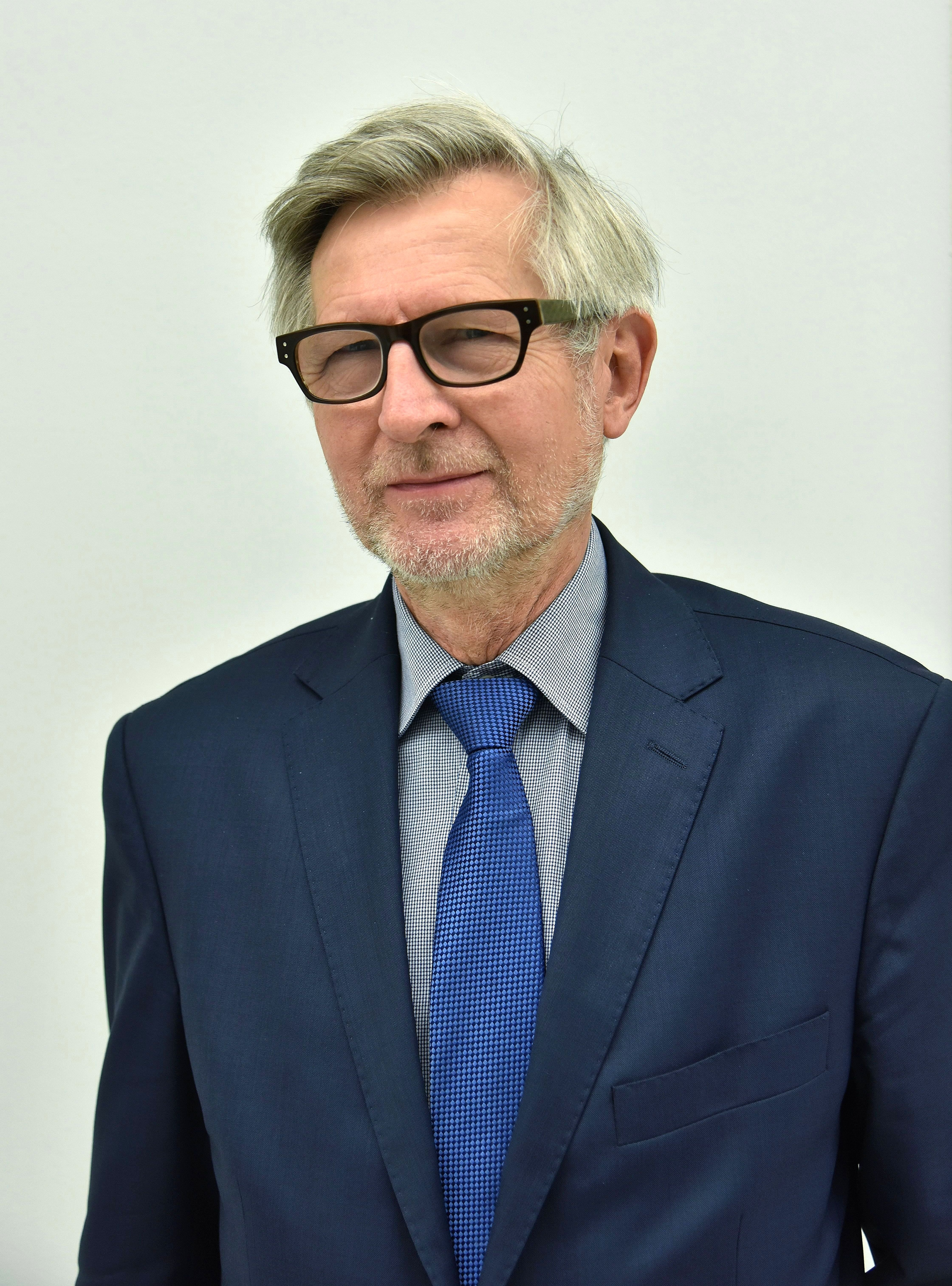

member of Sejm 2005-2007
- In office 25 September 2005 – ?

Personal details
- Born: 1953 (age 72–73)
- Party: Law and Justice

Witold Wojciech Czarnecki (born 12 April 1953 in Murowana Goślina) is a Polish politician. He was elected to the Sejm on 25 September 2005, getting 12,826 votes in 36 Kalisz district as a candidate from the Law and Justice list.

== See also ==
- Members of Polish Sejm 2005-2007
