= Nieszawa, Greater Poland Voivodeship =

Nieszawa
- Village
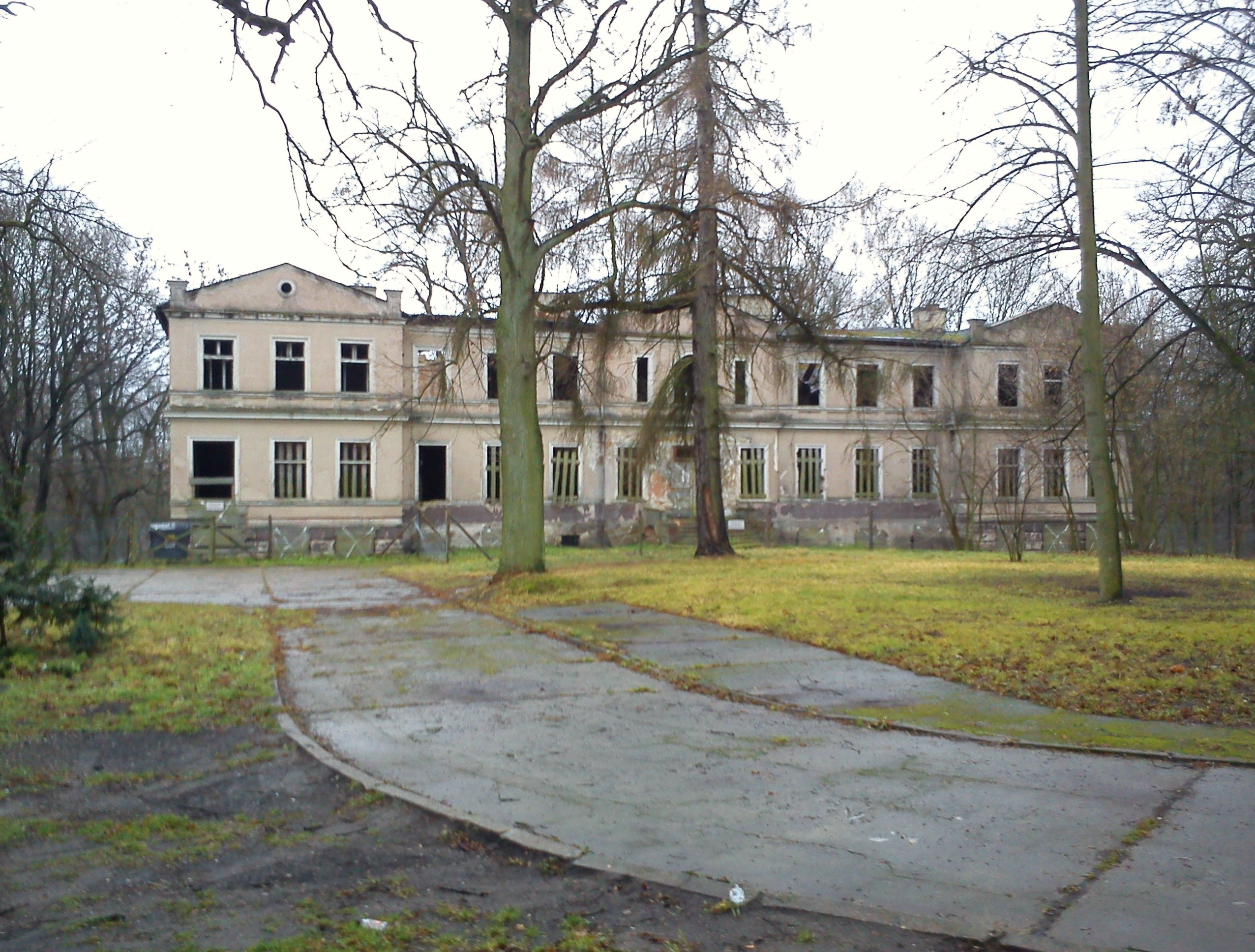

- Location within Poland
- Coordinates: 52°39′N 16°59′E
- Country: Poland
- Voivodeship: Greater Poland
- County: Poznań
- Gmina: Murowana Goślina

Nieszawa [ɲɛˈʂava] is a village in the administrative district of Gmina Murowana Goślina, within Poznań County, Greater Poland Voivodeship, in west-central Poland. It is first mentioned in written records in 1388. There is a manor house in the village, dating from the first half of the 19th century and partially rebuilt in the later part of that century.
