= Łoskoń Stary =

- Village
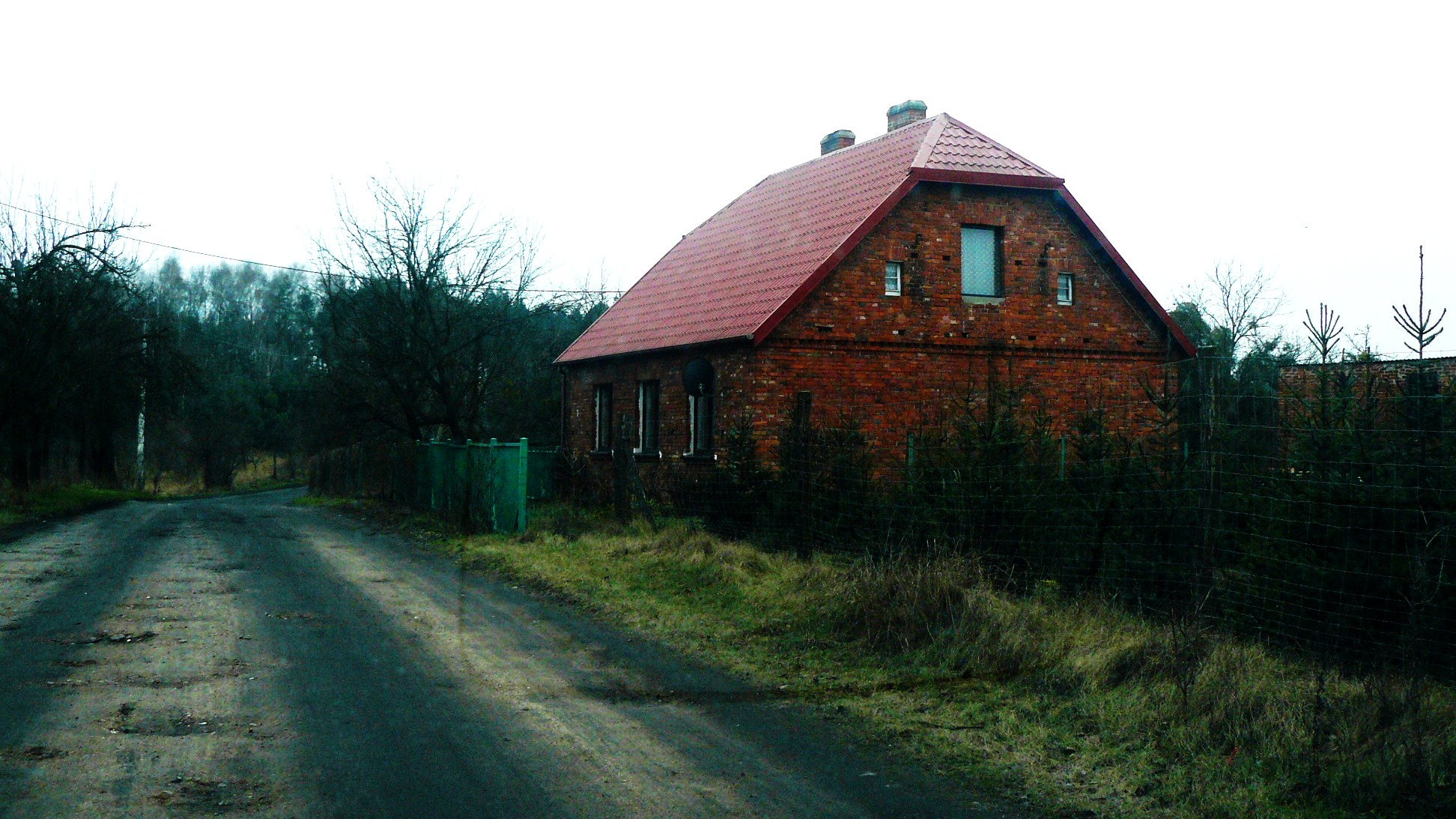

- Location within Poland
- Coordinates: 52°39′40″N 17°3′23″E
- Country: Poland
- Voivodeship: Greater Poland
- County: Poznań
- Gmina: Murowana Goślina

Łoskoń Stary [ˈwɔskɔɲ ˈstarɨ], known also as Stary Łoskoń ("Old Łoskoń"), is a village in the administrative district of Gmina Murowana Goślina, within Poznań County, Greater Poland Voivodeship, in west-central Poland. It is close to a small lake (Łoskoń Lake) and expanses of forest.
