= Mściszewo =

- Village
- Location within Poland
- Coordinates: 52°35′N 16°58′E
- Country: Poland
- Voivodeship: Greater Poland
- County: Poznań
- Gmina: Murowana Goślina
- Population: 292

Mściszewo [mɕt͡ɕiˈʂɛvɔ] is a village in the administrative district of Gmina Murowana Goślina, within Poznań County, Greater Poland Voivodeship, in west-central Poland.

Mściszewo is spread over quite an extensive area. It includes farms, a sand quarry, and both modern and older residential areas. The village has a volunteer fire brigade, and formerly had a school (1917–1976). Its first mention in written records dates from 1388. The village formerly belonged to the Cistercian convent at Owińska.

It is close to the Warta river, and includes the area of the former village of Goślinka or Mała Goślina ("Little Goślina"), a little south of the point where the Trojanka (or Goślinka) stream joins the Warta. South of this, along the road leading to Promnice, is the settlement of Złotoryjsko.
