= Złotoryjsko =

- Settlement
- Location within Poland
- Coordinates: 52°35′N 16°58′E
- Country: Poland
- Voivodeship: Greater Poland
- County: Poznań
- Gmina: Murowana Goślina
- Elevation: 60 m (200 ft)
- Population: 70

Złotoryjsko [zwɔtɔˈrɨi̯skɔ] is a settlement in the administrative district of Gmina Murowana Goślina, within Poznań County, Greater Poland Voivodeship, in west-central Poland. It is close to the Warta river, between Mściszewo and Promnice.
