= Wojnowo =

Wojnowo may refer to:

- Wojnowo, Golub-Dobrzyń County in Kuyavian-Pomeranian Voivodeship (north-central Poland)
- Wojnowo, Bydgoszcz County in Kuyavian-Pomeranian Voivodeship (north-central Poland)
- Wojnowo, Greater Poland Voivodeship (west-central Poland)
- Wojnowo, Lubusz Voivodeship (west Poland)
- Wojnowo, Warmian-Masurian Voivodeship (north Poland)
- Wojnowo, West Pomeranian Voivodeship (north-west Poland)
