= Łopuchówko =

- Village
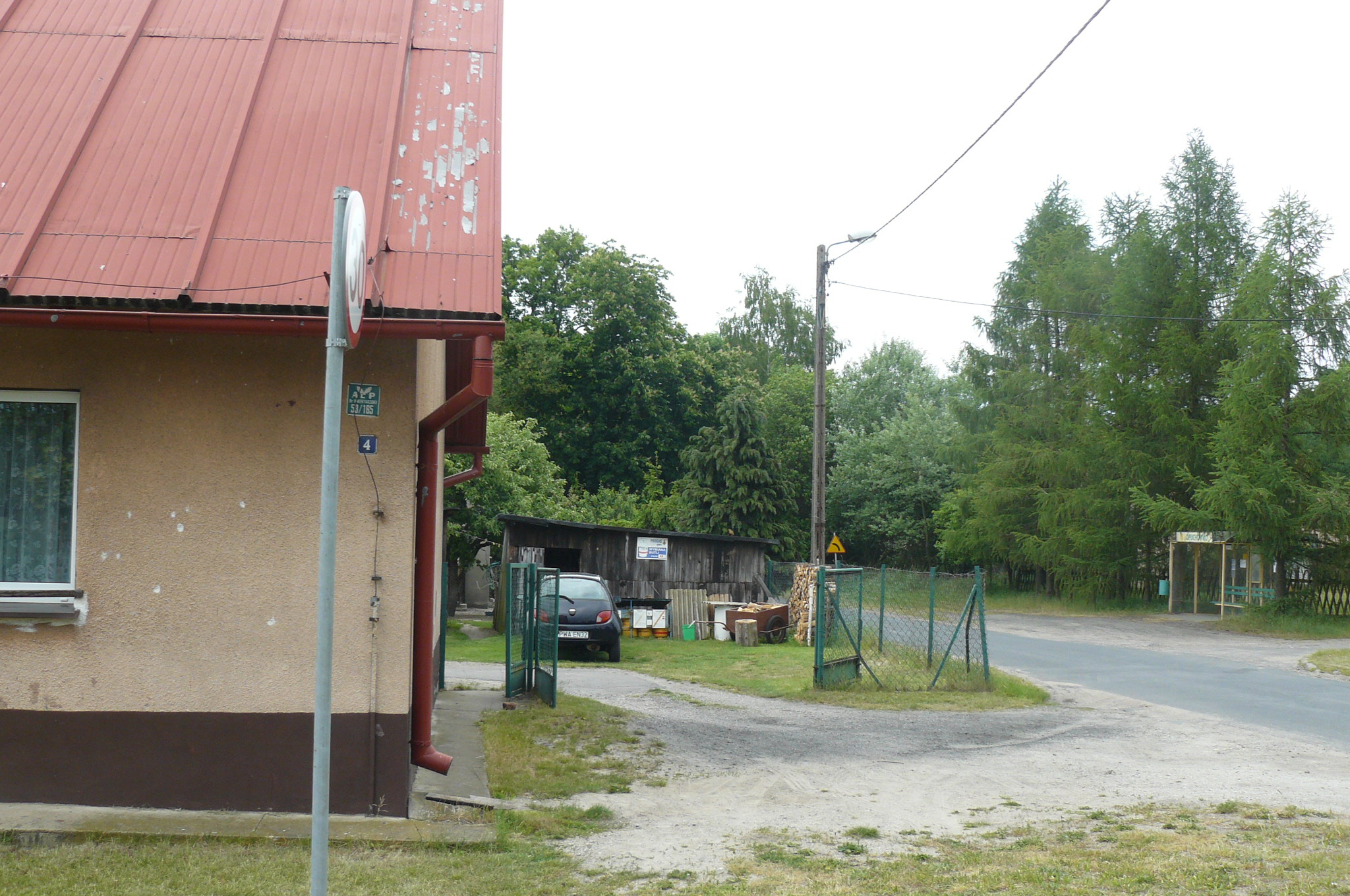

- Location within Poland
- Coordinates: 52°35′57″N 17°5′58″E
- Country: Poland
- Voivodeship: Greater Poland
- County: Poznań
- Gmina: Murowana Goślina

Łopuchówko [wɔpuˈxufkɔ] is a village in the administrative district of Gmina Murowana Goślina, within Poznań County, Greater Poland Voivodeship, in west-central Poland. Łopuchówko is situated within the Puszcza Zielonka forest and landscape park. Łopuchówko houses the headquarters of the district forestry board (Nadleśnictwo Łopuchówko) which is responsible for administration of the surrounding forest areas.
