= Trojanowo, Greater Poland Voivodeship =

Trojanowo
- Village
- Location within Poland
- Coordinates: 52°36′N 17°1′E
- Country: Poland
- Voivodeship: Greater Poland
- County: Poznań
- Gmina: Murowana Goślina

Trojanowo [trɔjaˈnɔvɔ] is a village in the administrative district of Gmina Murowana Goślina, within Poznań County, Greater Poland Voivodeship, in west-central Poland.
