= Gmina Murowana Goślina =

Gmina Murowana Goślina Murowana Goślina Commune
- Gmina
- Flag Coat of arms
- Interactive map of Gmina Murowana Goślina
- Coordinates (Murowana Goślina): 52°34′N 17°1′E
- Country: Poland
- Voivodeship: Greater Poland
- County: Poznań County
- Seat: Murowana Goślina

Area
  - Total: 162.84 km^{2} (62.87 sq mi)

Population (2006)
  - Total: 15,766
  - Density: 96.819/km^{2} (250.76/sq mi)
  - Urban: 10,140
  - Rural: 5,626
- Website: http://www.murowana-goslina.pl

Gmina Murowana Goślina is a village gmina (administrative district) in Poznań County, Greater Poland Voivodeship, in west-central Poland. Its seat is the town of Murowana Goślina, which lies approximately 20 kilometres (12 mi) north of the regional capital Poznań. The gmina consists of Murowana Goślina and the countryside and villages mainly to the north and east of that town. Much of the eastern part of the gmina is covered by the forests of the Puszcza Zielonka Landscape Park.

The gmina covers an area of 162.84 square kilometres (62.9 sq mi), and as of 2023 its total population is 15,766 (out of which the population of Murowana Goślina amounts to 10,140, and the population of the rural part of the gmina is 5,626).

== Villages ==
Apart from the town of Murowana Goślina, the gmina contains the villages and settlements of Białęgi, Białężyn, Boduszewo, Długa Goślina, Głębocko, Głęboczek, Kamińsko, Łopuchówko, Łopuchowo, Łoskoń Stary, Mściszewo, Nieszawa, Pławno, Przebędowo, Raduszyn, Rakownia, Starczanowo, Trojanowo, Uchorowo, Wojnówko, Wojnowo, Zielonka and Złotoryjsko.

== Neighbouring gminas ==
Gmina Murowana Goślina is bordered by Gmina Oborniki, Gmina Rogoźno and Gmina Skoki to the north, Gmina Kiszkowo to the east, Gmina Pobiedziska to the south-east, Gmina Czerwonak to the south, and Gmina Suchy Las to the west. In the last case the boundary runs along the river Warta and has no crossing points.
