= Dąbrówka Kościelna, Greater Poland Voivodeship =

Dąbrówka Kościelna
- Village
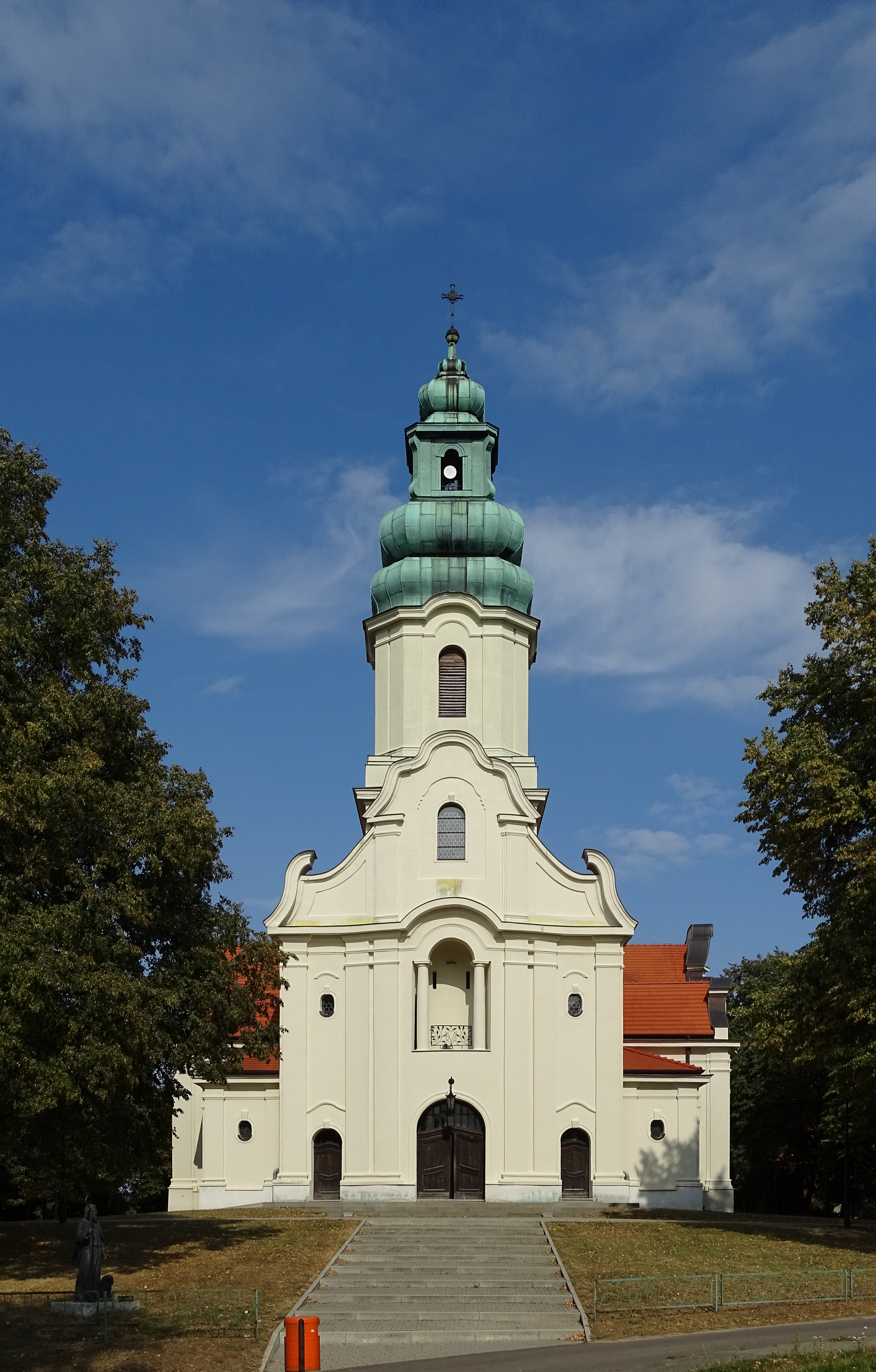
- Church of the Assumption of the Blessed Virgin Mary

- Location within Poland
- Coordinates: 52°34′N 17°10′E
- Country: Poland
- Voivodeship: Greater Poland
- County: Gniezno
- Gmina: Kiszkowo
- Time zone: UTC+1 (CET)
  - Summer (DST): UTC+2 (CEST)
- Vehicle registration: PGN

Dąbrówka Kościelna [dɔmˈbrufka kɔɕˈt͡ɕɛlna] (German: Eichkirch) is a village in the administrative district of Gmina Kiszkowo, within Gniezno County, Greater Poland Voivodeship, in west-central Poland. It is surrounded by forest areas, and lies in the eastern part of Puszcza Zielonka Landscape Park.

The village has a neo-baroque Roman Catholic church (the Church of the Assumption of the Blessed Virgin Mary), built in 1925 in place of the former wooden church. The church houses a picture of the Madonna and Child, to which miracles have long been attributed (the original picture was displayed on an oak tree, and was said to glow in the dark), making the village and its church a popular destination for pilgrims since the 17th century. This tradition continues today, particularly in the form of an annual fair and mass pilgrimage in September. This takes place on the weekend of the first Sunday after 8 September, which is celebrated as the birthday of the Virgin Mary.

The present picture is actually the fourth copy of the original, which was destroyed when the then church burnt down as a result of lightning strike in 1774. A copy survived and continued to be venerated until the subsequent fire in 1925. A further copy (by Poznań artist Zientkiewicz) was consecrated in 1927. This was removed from the church by the parish priest in 1939 in an attempt to save it from the invading German forces at the start of World War II, but it was lost during fighting near Kutno, when the house in which it was being stored was destroyed. A further copy (based on surviving prints) was made in 1949 (by Edmund Szyfter), but it was felt to be of poor artistic quality and was demoted to use in processions. The copy currently on display over the church altar was commissioned in 1955 from the Toruń artist Professor Leonard Torwirt.

On 15 June 1969 the picture was "crowned" by the addition of gold crowns on the heads of Mary and Jesus, in a ceremony presided over by the Primate of Poland and authorized by Pope Paul VI. The original crowns were stolen from the church, along with other valuable items, in 1989, but new crowns were added at a second coronation ceremony in 1994.

In 2014, then U.S. Secretary of Defense Chuck Hagel visited the Church of the Assumption, where his great grandparents, Tomasz Kakolewski and Katarzyna Budnikowska, were married in 1882.
