= Białęgi, Greater Poland Voivodeship =

Białęgi
- Village
- Location within Poland
- Coordinates: 52°36′N 17°0′E
- Country: Poland
- Voivodeship: Greater Poland
- County: Poznań
- Gmina: Murowana Goślina
- Population: 80

Białęgi [bjaˈwɛŋɡi] is a village in the administrative district of Gmina Murowana Goślina, within Poznań County, Greater Poland Voivodeship, in west-central Poland.

The village has an approximate population of 80.
