= Promnice =

- Village
- Location within Poland
- Coordinates: 52°33′N 16°57′E
- Country: Poland
- Voivodeship: Greater Poland
- County: Poznań
- Gmina: Czerwonak
- Population: 450

Promnice [prɔmˈnit͡sɛ] is a village in the administrative district of Gmina Czerwonak, within Poznań County, Greater Poland Voivodeship, in west-central Poland.

Just to the west of Promnice is a road bridge crossing the Warta river, on the road between Bolechowo and Biedrusko. The village stretches mainly northwards from that road, adjoining the settlement of Złotoryjsko to the north.
