= Przebędowo, Greater Poland Voivodeship =

Przebędowo
- Village
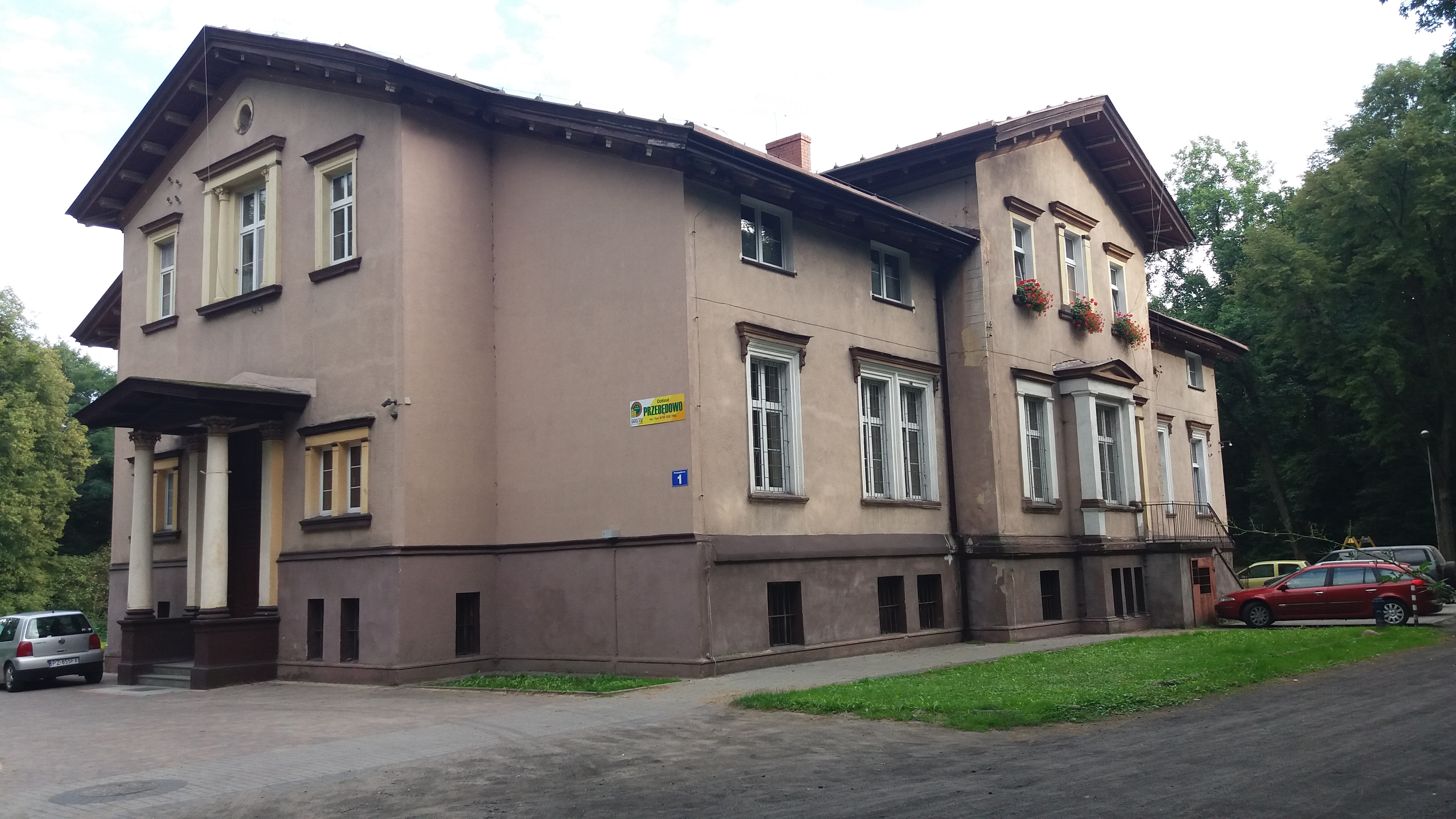
- Palace in Przebędowo 2016

- Location within Poland
- Coordinates: 52°35′N 17°1′E
- Country: Poland
- Voivodeship: Greater Poland
- County: Poznań
- Gmina: Murowana Goślina

Przebędowo [pʂɛbɛnˈdɔvɔ] is a village in the administrative district of Gmina Murowana Goślina, within Poznań County, Greater Poland Voivodeship, in west-central Poland. It is immediately adjacent to Murowana Goślina (approximately 2 kilometres (1 mi) north of the town centre), and 22 km (14 mi) north of the regional capital Poznań. It has a former manor house (built 1890), park, former industrial sites and farm buildings, as well as residential blocks.

From 1953 to 1998, a mediumwave broadcasting station working on 738 kHz with a 215 metres high mast was near the village.
