= Starczanowo, Poznań County =

Starczanowo
- Village
- Location within Poland
- Coordinates: 52°36′N 16°57′E
- Country: Poland
- Voivodeship: Greater Poland
- County: Poznań
- Gmina: Murowana Goślina
- Population: 50

Starczanowo [start͡ʂaˈnɔvɔ] is a village in the administrative district of Gmina Murowana Goślina, within Poznań County, Greater Poland Voivodeship, in west-central Poland. It was first mentioned in written records in 1364. It has an approximate population of 50.

About 1 km east of the village is the site of Radzim, formerly a fortress and castellany on an island (now a peninsula) in the Warta river (first mentioned 1254). This was an important centre in the Piast kingdom, lying on a route between Gniezno and western Pomerania. However, the castellany ceased to exist in the second half of the fifteenth century, and the remaining village of Radzim declined in the 18th century as a result of the Swedish invasions, finally being wiped out by cholera in the early 19th century. No buildings survive, but architectural work has been carried out on the site.

A little further north along the Warta is the Śnieżycowy Jar nature reserve, founded in 1975 and now covering 9 hectares. It is most notable for the large numbers of spring snowflakes (Leucojum vernum) which bloom in March. This is one of the few places where this flower is found in lowland Poland. It is thought to have been brought here by human intervention in the 19th century.

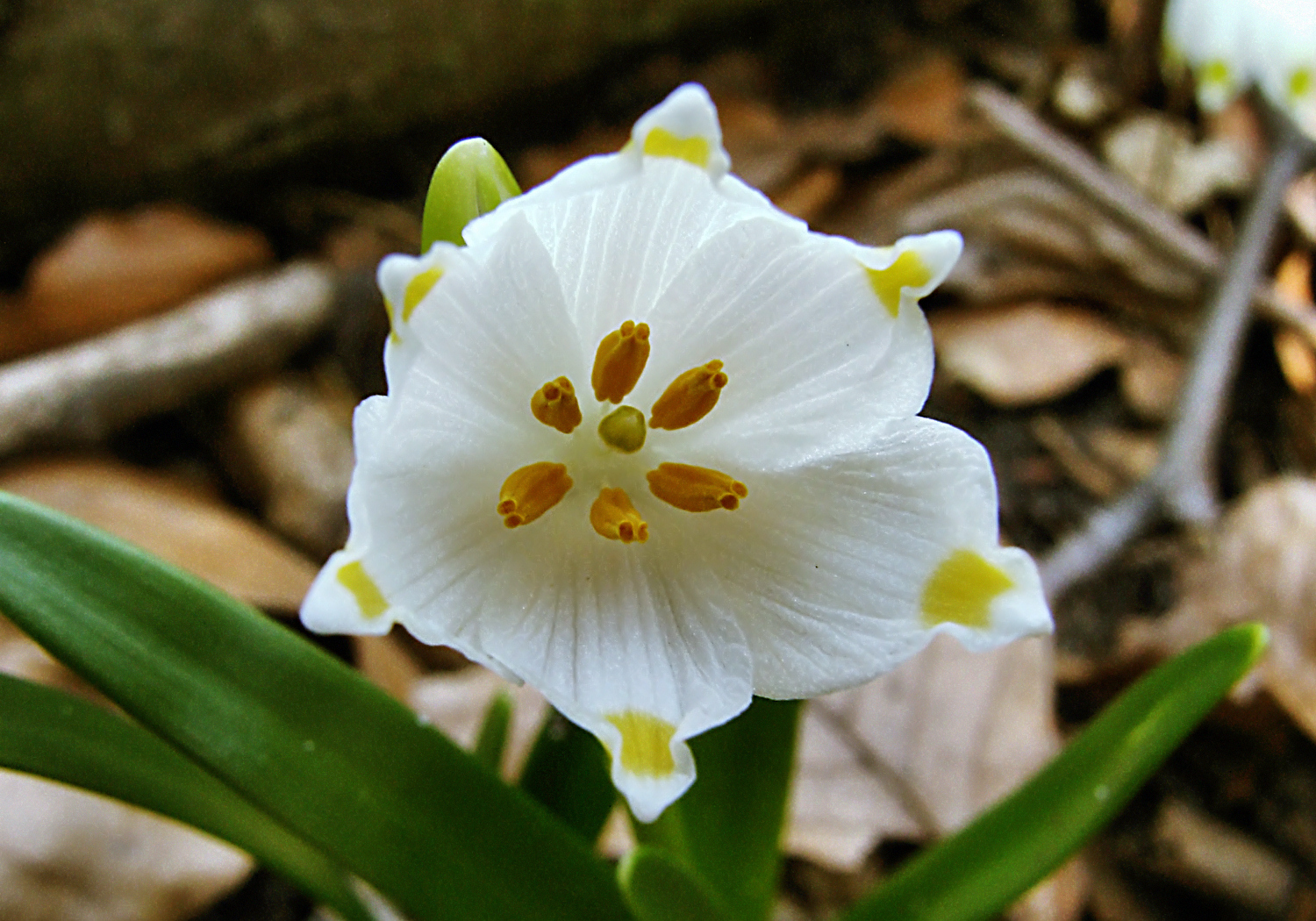
Spring snowflake (Leucojum vernum)
