= Kamińsko, Greater Poland Voivodeship =

Kamińsko
- Village
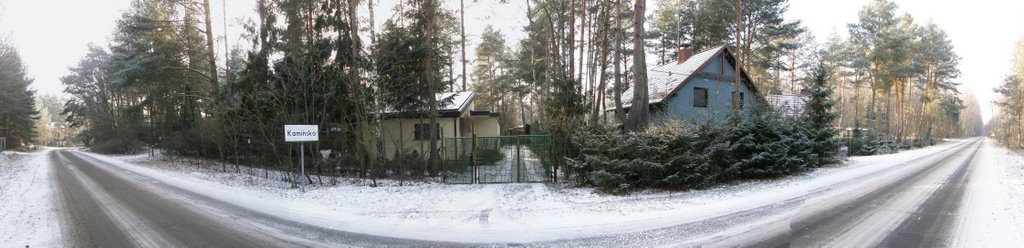

- Location within Poland
- Coordinates: 52°32′N 17°4′E
- Country: Poland
- Voivodeship: Greater Poland
- County: Poznań
- Gmina: Murowana Goślina

Kamińsko [kaˈmiɲskɔ] is a village in the administrative district of Gmina Murowana Goślina, within Poznań County, Greater Poland Voivodeship, in west-central Poland. It lies within the Puszcza Zielonka forest and landscape park.

It is close to two lakes, Jezioro Kamińsko ("Kamińsko lake") and Jezioro Miejskie ("town lake"), both of which have popular bathing beaches, and there are a large number of summer holiday homes in the vicinity.
