= Raduszyn =

- Village
- Location within Poland
- Coordinates: 52°34′35″N 16°59′21″E
- Country: Poland
- Voivodeship: Greater Poland
- County: Poznań
- Gmina: Murowana Goślina
- Population: 280

Raduszyn [raˈduʂɨn] is a village in the administrative district of Gmina Murowana Goślina, within Poznań County, Greater Poland Voivodeship, in west-central Poland. In 2006 the village had a population of 280.

It was founded in 1736 (its former German name was Hamer). It formerly had an ironworks (until 1800), a paper factory (until 1840) and a mill. Some of the mill buildings (from the late 19th and early 20th century) survive. There is also a former collective farm, now operating a stables and riding school, and several apartment blocks.
