= Wojnówko, Poznań County =

Wojnówko
- Settlement
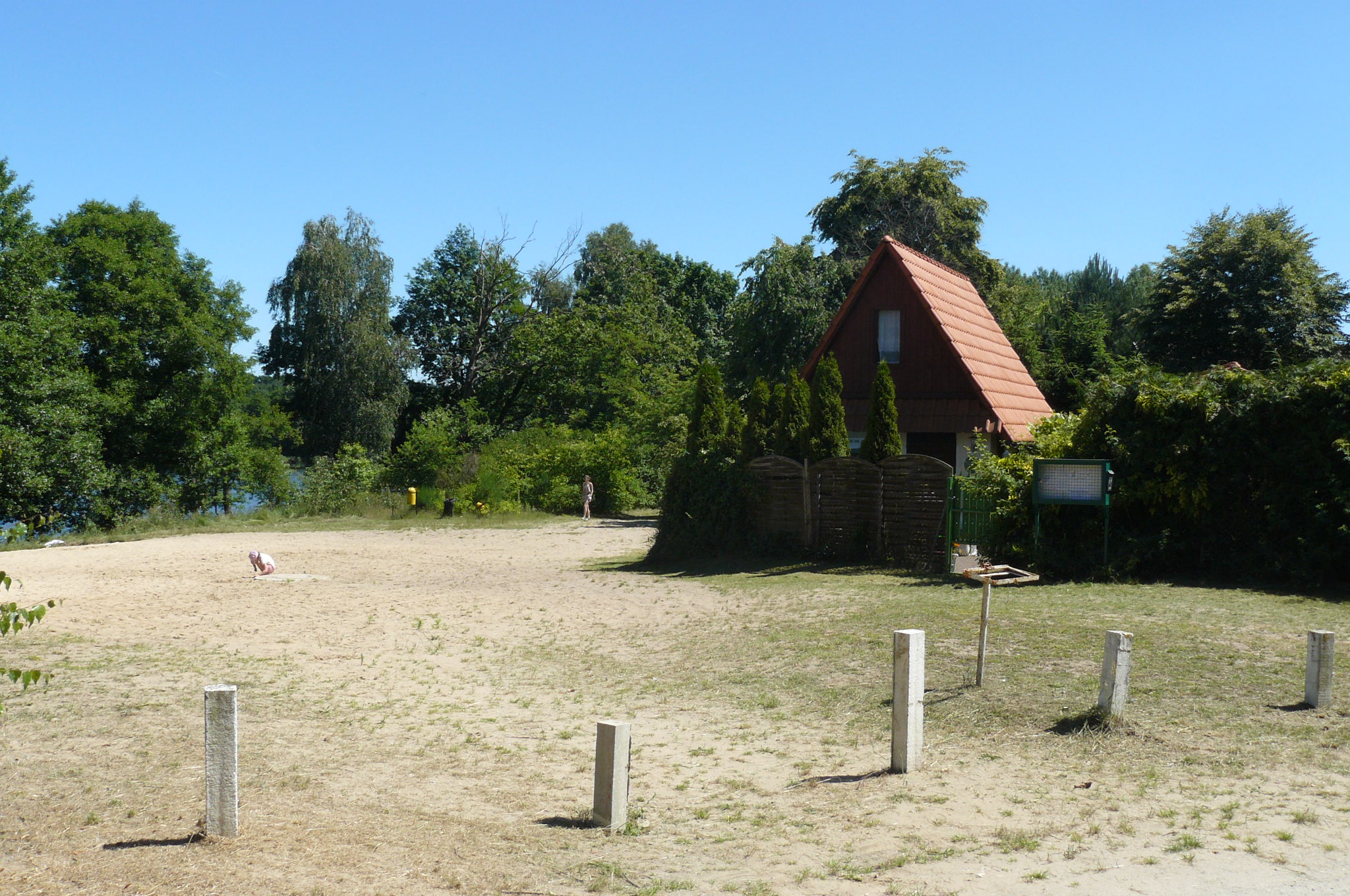

- Location within Poland
- Coordinates: 52°38′11″N 17°4′23″E
- Country: Poland
- Voivodeship: Greater Poland
- County: Poznań
- Gmina: Murowana Goślina
- Population: 26
- Website: wojnowko.za.pl

Wojnówko [vɔi̯ˈnufkɔ] is a settlement in the administrative district of Gmina Murowana Goślina, within Poznań County, Greater Poland Voivodeship, in west-central Poland. It lies on the banks of a small lake, Lake Łomno, and close to forest areas.

The settlement consists largely of a complex of vacation properties. It has a small permanent population of about 26. It belongs to the sołectwo of Wojnowo. (The name Wojnówko is a diminutive of Wojnowo.)
