= Łopuchowo, Greater Poland Voivodeship =

Łopuchowo
- Village
- Location within Poland
- Coordinates: 52°37′N 17°6′E
- Country: Poland
- Voivodeship: Greater Poland
- County: Poznań
- Gmina: Murowana Goślina
- Population: 350

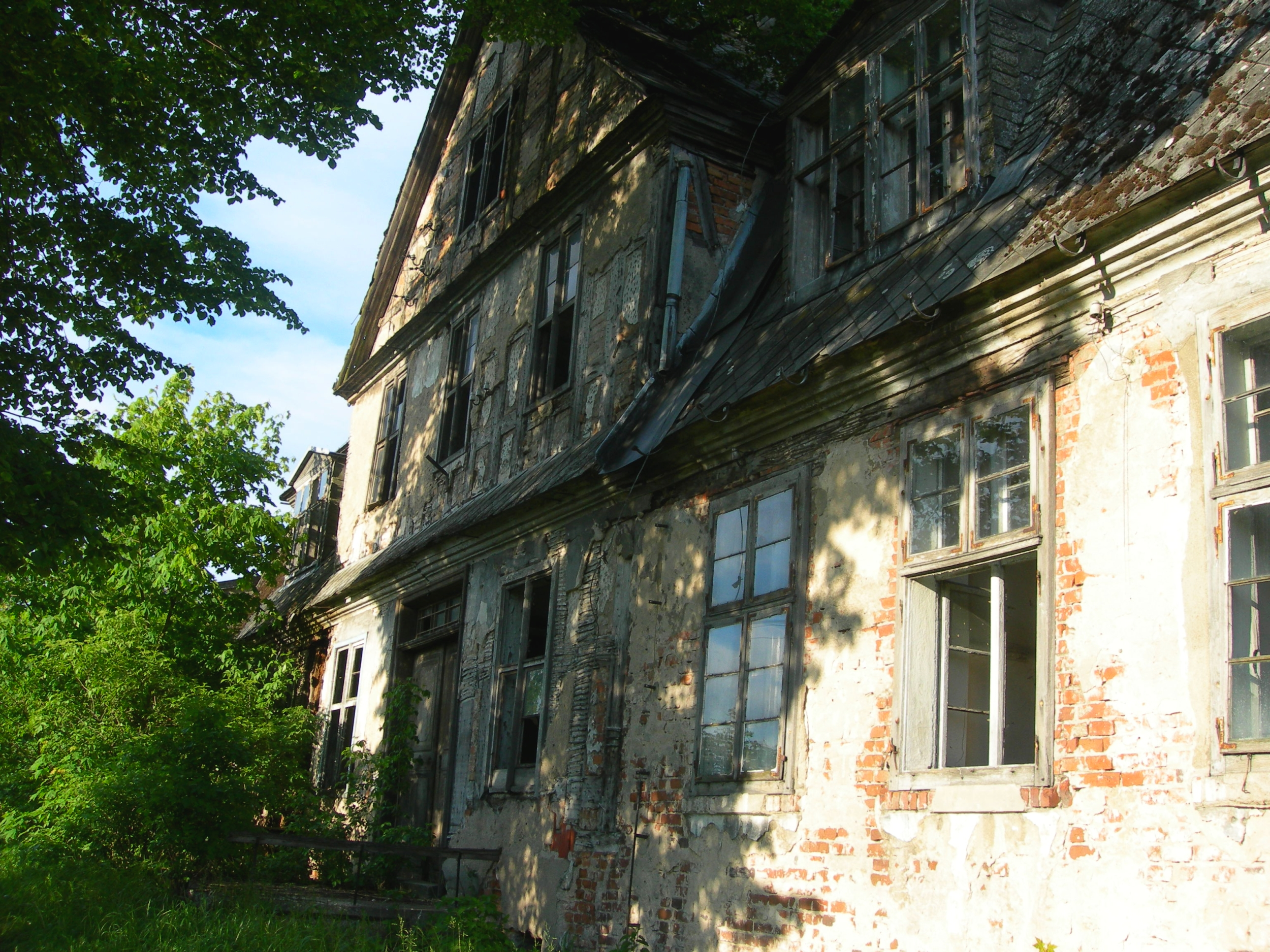
The former manor house

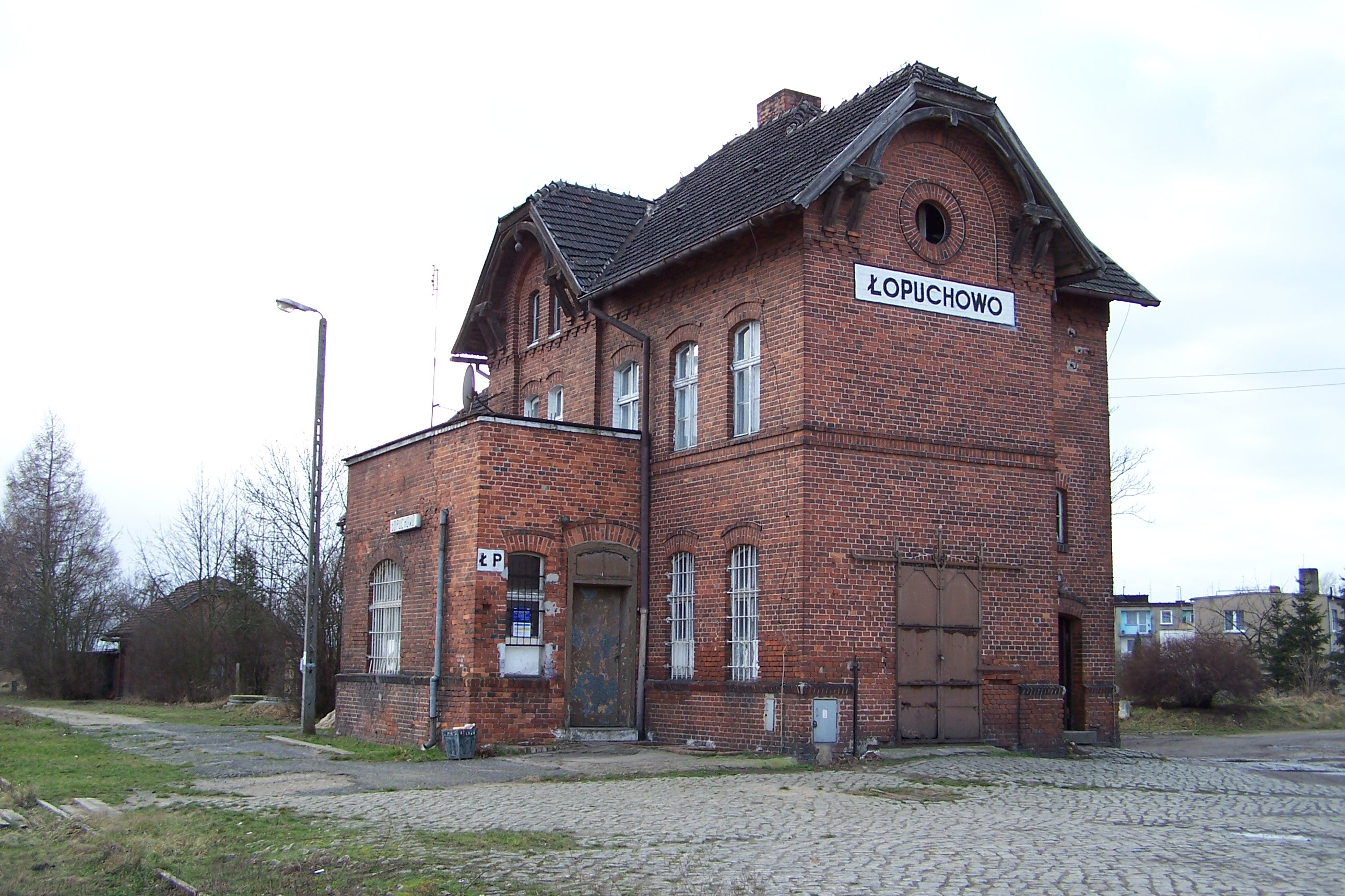
The railway station

Łopuchowo [wɔpuˈxɔvɔ] is a village in the administrative district of Gmina Murowana Goślina, within Poznań County, Greater Poland Voivodeship, in west-central Poland. The village lies on the main road and railway line between Poznań and Wągrowiec.

Łopuchowo has a small primary school, a chapel, a local league football club and a railway station. It is served by buses and trains running between Poznań and Wągrowiec. There is also a small manor house in the village, built in 1780, currently in a state of disrepair.
