= Długa Goślina =

- Village
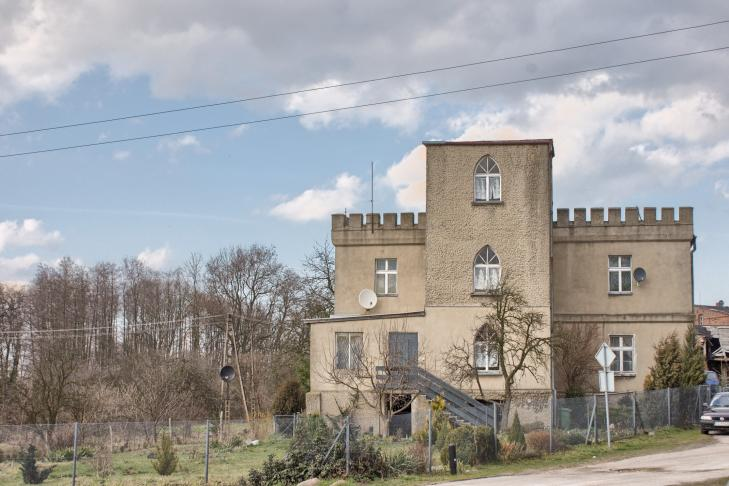

- Location within Poland
- Coordinates: 52°38′N 17°2′E
- Country: Poland
- Voivodeship: Greater Poland
- County: Poznań
- Gmina: Murowana Goślina
- Population (2006): 390

Długa Goślina [ˈdwuɡa ɡɔˈɕlina] is a village in the administrative district of Gmina Murowana Goślina, within Poznań County, Greater Poland Voivodeship, in west-central Poland. In 2006 the village had a population of 390.

The village stretches for a few kilometres along the road from Murowana Goślina to Rogoźno, as is implied by its name (the prefix Długa is Polish for "long"). It has a wooden church, with relics dating from the 17th and 18th centuries (one of the sites on the Wooden Churches Trail around Puszcza Zielonka). The church is the venue for a regular series of summer music festivals. The village also has a primary school and a volunteer fire brigade. Burned by Kalmyks in 1707.
