= Puszcza Zielonka Landscape Park =

Landscape park of Poland

Coordinates: 52.5533°N 17.1133°E

- Park Krajobrazowy Puszcza Zielonka
- IUCN category V (protected landscape/seascape)
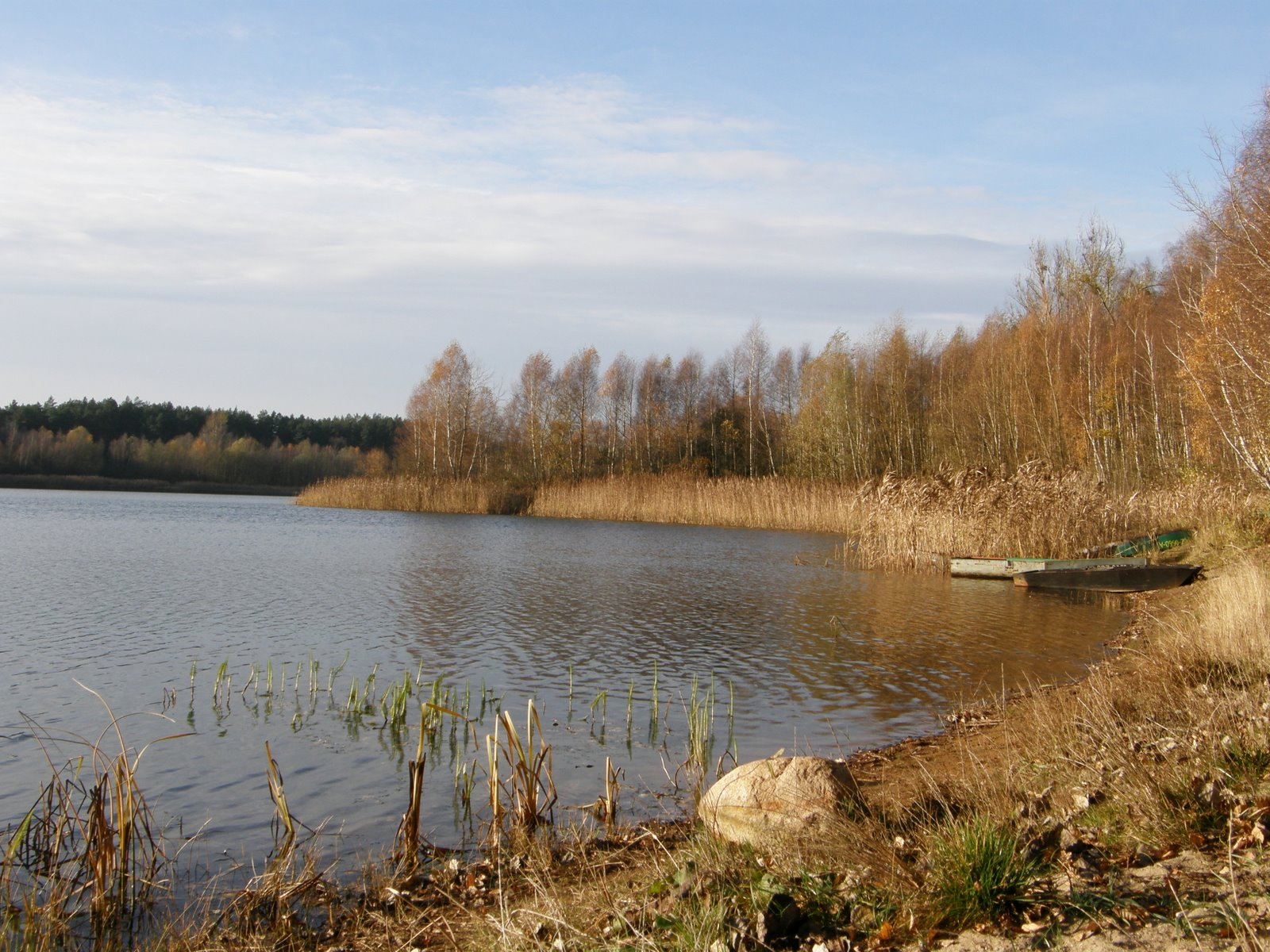
- Kamińsko Lake
- Interactive map of Puszcza Zielonka Landscape Park
- Location: Greater Poland Voivodeship
- Area: 114 km^{2} (44 sq mi)
- Established: 1993

Location in Poland

Puszcza Zielonka Landscape Park (Polish: Park Krajobrazowy Puszcza Zielonka) is a protected area (Landscape Park) situated to the north-east of the city of Poznań in Greater Poland Voivodeship, Poland. It was set up in 1993 and covers an area of 114 square kilometres (44 sq mi). It is made up of parts of the gminas (administrative districts) of Czerwonak, Kiszkowo, Murowana Goślina, Pobiedziska and Skoki. It consists mainly of the Puszcza Zielonka forest (80% of the area of the landscape park is forest). It includes five nature reserves, several lakes, and villages including Zielonka, Kamińsko, Dąbrówka Kościelna, Głęboczek, Łopuchówko and Tuczno. The highest point is Dziewicza Góra, in the south-west of the park, with a height of 143 metres (469 ft). At the top of this hill is an observation tower, used especially for observing possible fires in the surrounding forest, but also seasonally opened to the public as a viewing tower.

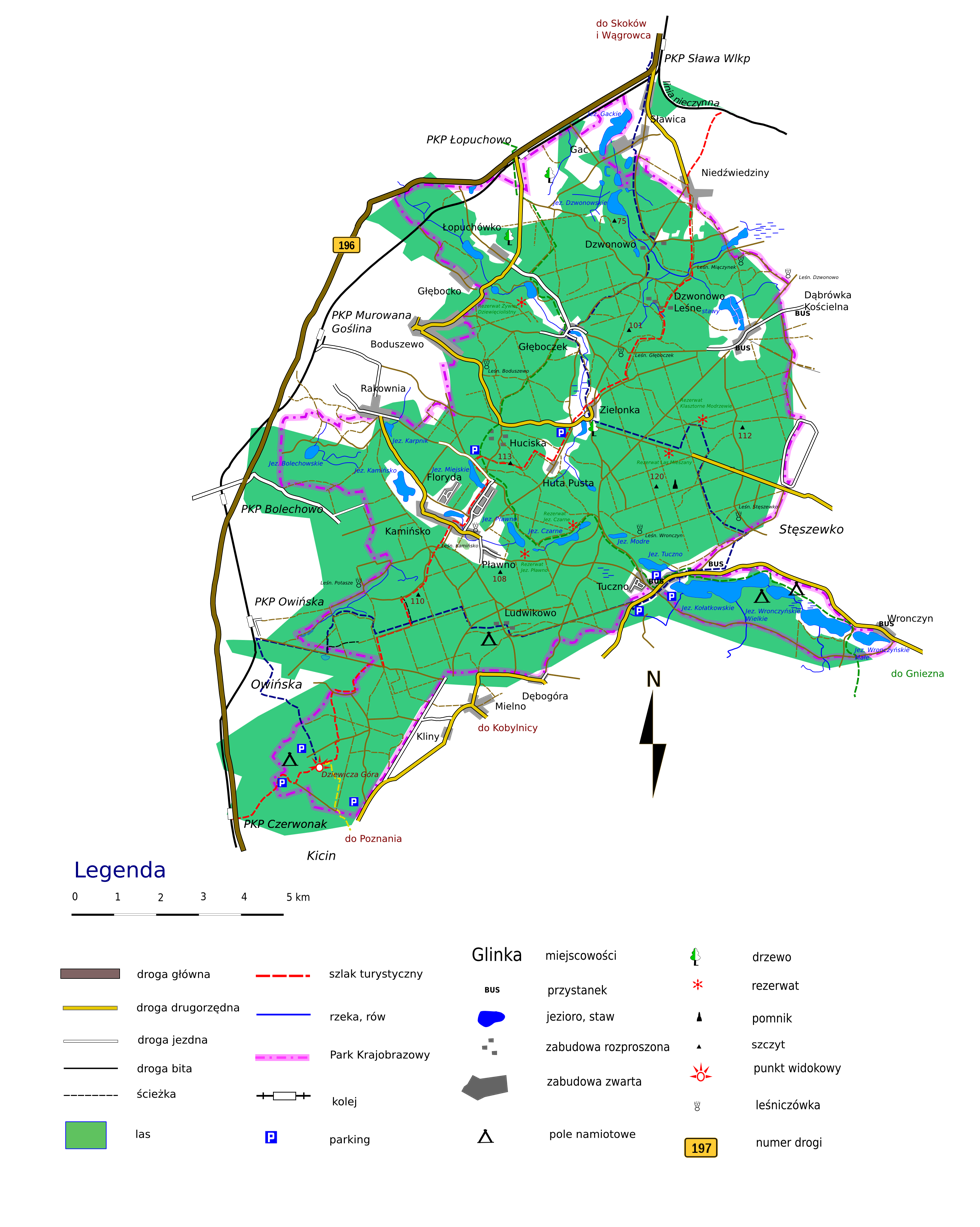
Topographic map of the area

Parts of the forest are used for experimental purposes by the University of Life Sciences in Poznań, which has a centre in Zielonka. There is also an arboretum in Zielonka with about 800 trees and bushes. The area is popular with tourists and day-trippers, particularly in summer.

The Park is promoted by the Puszcza Zielonka Inter-District Association (Związek międzygminny Puszcza Zielonka), which has its offices in Murowana Goślina. In 2008 the Association instituted a "Wooden Churches Trail around Puszcza Zielonka" (Szlak kościołów drewnianych wokół Puszczy Zielonka), which includes 12 wooden churches in the neighbourhood of the forest, situated in Długa Goślina, Skoki, Raczkowo, Jabłkowo, Łagiewniki Kościelne, Sławno, Kiszkowo, Rejowiec, Kicin, Wierzenica, Węglewo and Uzarzewo. Within the Park is a brick church and pilgrimage site in the village of Dąbrówka Kościelna.
