= Żydowo =

Żydowo may refer to the following places:

- Żydowo, Gniezno County in Greater Poland Voivodeship (west-central Poland)
- Żydowo, Kościan County in Greater Poland Voivodeship (west-central Poland)
- Żydowo, Kuyavian-Pomeranian Voivodeship (central Poland)
- Żydowo, Poznań County in Greater Poland Voivodeship (west-central Poland)
- Żydowo, Września County in Greater Poland Voivodeship (west-central Poland)
- Żydowo, Lubusz Voivodeship (west Poland)
- Żydowo, Warmian-Masurian Voivodeship (north Poland)
- Żydowo, Koszalin County in West Pomeranian Voivodeship (north-west Poland)
- Żydowo, Myślibórz County in West Pomeranian Voivodeship (north-west Poland)

== See also ==
- Lubicz coat of arms
