= Czeluścin =

Czeluścin may refer to:

- Czeluścin, Gniezno County
- Czeluścin, Gostyń County
