= Pakszyn =

- Village
- Location within Poland
- Coordinates: 52°25′29″N 17°31′00″E
- Country: Poland
- Voivodeship: Greater Poland
- County: Gniezno
- Gmina: Czerniejewo

Pakszyn [ˈpakʂɨn] is a village in the administrative district of Gmina Czerniejewo, within Gniezno County, Greater Poland Voivodeship, in west-central Poland.

It is located approximately 1 kilometre (0.6 mi) east of Czerniejewo, the seat of Gmina Czerniejewo, 12 kilometres (7 mi) southwest of Gniezno, the seat of Gniezno County, and 39 kilometres (24 mi) east of Poznań, the regional capital.

== History ==
From 1975 to 1998, Pakszyn was part of the Poznań Voivodeship.

Since 1999, Pakszyn has been part of the Greater Poland Voivodeship.
