= Adam Szejnfeld =

Polish politician (born 1958)

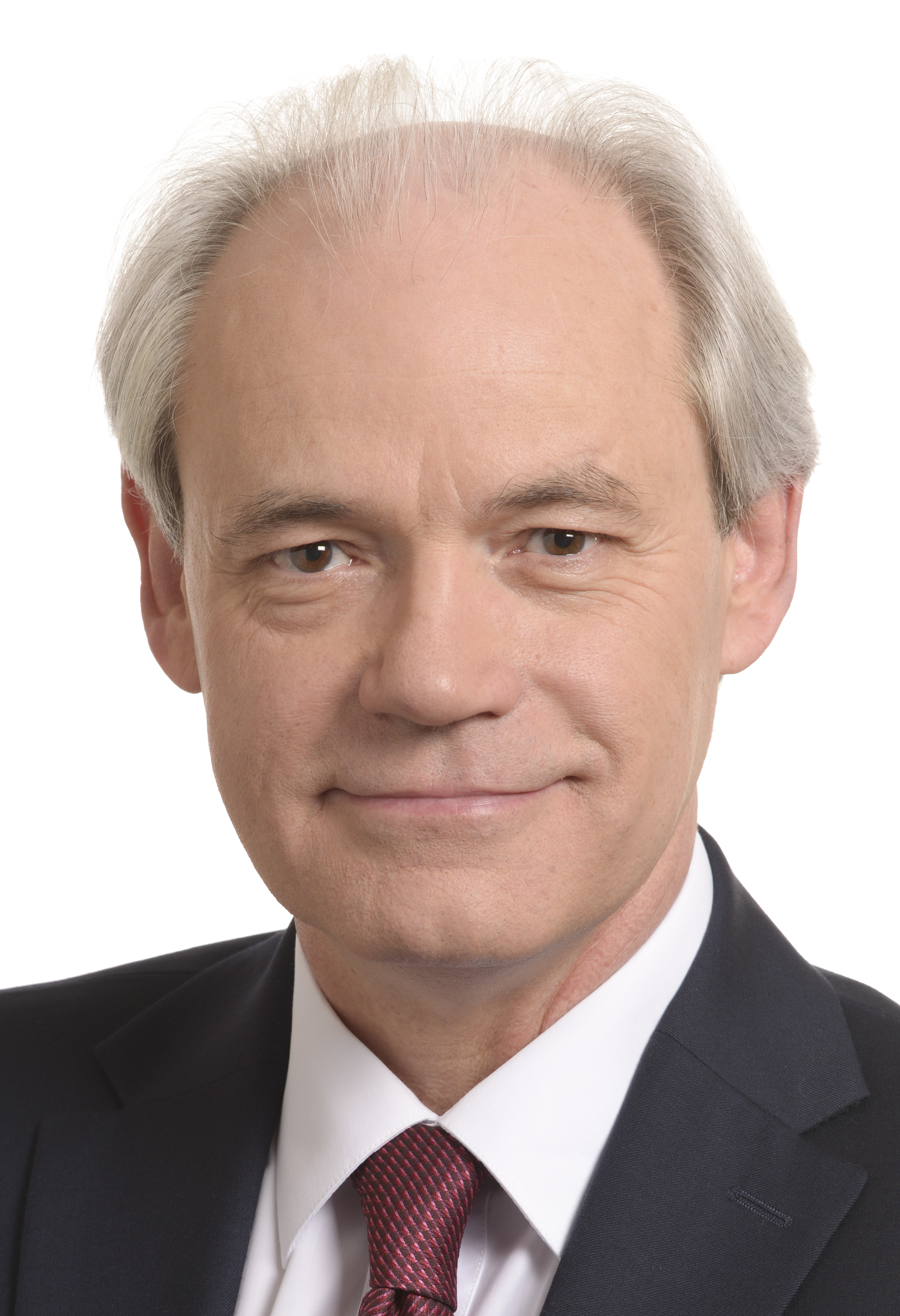

member of Sejm 2005-2007
- Incumbent
- Assumed office 25 September 2005

Personal details
- Born: 1958 (age 67–68) Kalisz
- Party: Civic Platform

Adam Stanisław Szejnfeld (Polish pronunciation: [ˈadam ˈʂɛjnfɛlt]; born 13 November 1958) is a Polish politician. He was elected to the Sejm on 25 September 2005, getting 26,568 votes in 38 Piła district as a candidate from the Civic Platform list.

== Life and career ==
In the 80's he was a social and union activist, a member of the underground group "Solidarity". He was interned in Gębarzewo and Wronki prisons. Later, he co-founded the Citizens' Committee, and was a private entrepreneur and an activist in the local government.

In the years 1990-1998 he served as a councilor and mayor of the town and municipality of Szamocin. He was vice-president of the Convention of Regional Mayors and vice-president of the Association of Pila, as well as the "Greater Centre for Education and Local Government Studies". Adam Szejnfeld was active in sports, winning multiple medals and performing various roles in basketball games. He was also the President of the sports club "Sokół".

In 1997 he graduated from the Faculty of Law of the Adam Mickiewicz University in Poznań.

In 1997-2007, he held the position of the third term on behalf of Freedom Union, and the fourth and the fifth terms of office on behalf of the Civic Platform. In parliament he served as President of the Parliamentary Commission of Economy and Vice-President of the Parliamentary Committee on Small and Medium Enterprises. He was also a member of the Board of Tourism at the Ministry of Economy, many years chairman of the Wielkopolska Trade Program for Small and Medium-Sized Enterprises and a member of the Chapter President's Award of Commerce, and a member of the Council for the Protection of Labour. In parliamentary elections in 2007, he was elected for the fourth time and received 57,343 votes in the district of Pila. In 20 November 2007 he was appointed as Secretary of State in the Ministry of Economy. On 7 October 2009 he resigned, and was formally canceled on 20 October that year. In the elections to the Sejm in 2011 he successfully ran for re-election, and received 45, 764 votes.

He was a member of the Civic Democratic Action Movement, and the Democratic Poland and Freedom Union. Since 2001 he identifies with the Civic Platform party. As a deputy PO he was spokesman for the economy. He is a member of the Convention of the State Higher Vocational School in Pila, as well as many non-governmental organizations such as the National Association of Reliable Businesses, the Polish Business Roundtable Club, the Chamber of Commerce of Pila. Holds is also the honorary president of the premier volleyball club VKS "Joker".

In July 2014, he was elected a member of the European Parliament. He lost his seat in the 2019 election.

In the 2023 Polish parliamentary election, he was elected to the Senate of Poland in District 88.

== See also ==
- Members of Polish Sejm 2005-2007
