= Goranin, Gniezno County =

Goranin
- Village
- Location within Poland
- Coordinates: 52°27′32.55″N 17°29′42.46″E
- Country: Poland
- Voivodeship: Greater Poland
- County: Gniezno
- Gmina: Czerniejewo
- Population: 140

Goranin [ɡɔˈranin] is a village in the administrative district of Gmina Czerniejewo, within Gniezno County, Greater Poland Voivodeship, in west-central Poland.
