= Marshal Józef Piłsudski Park, Września =

Polish park and memorial

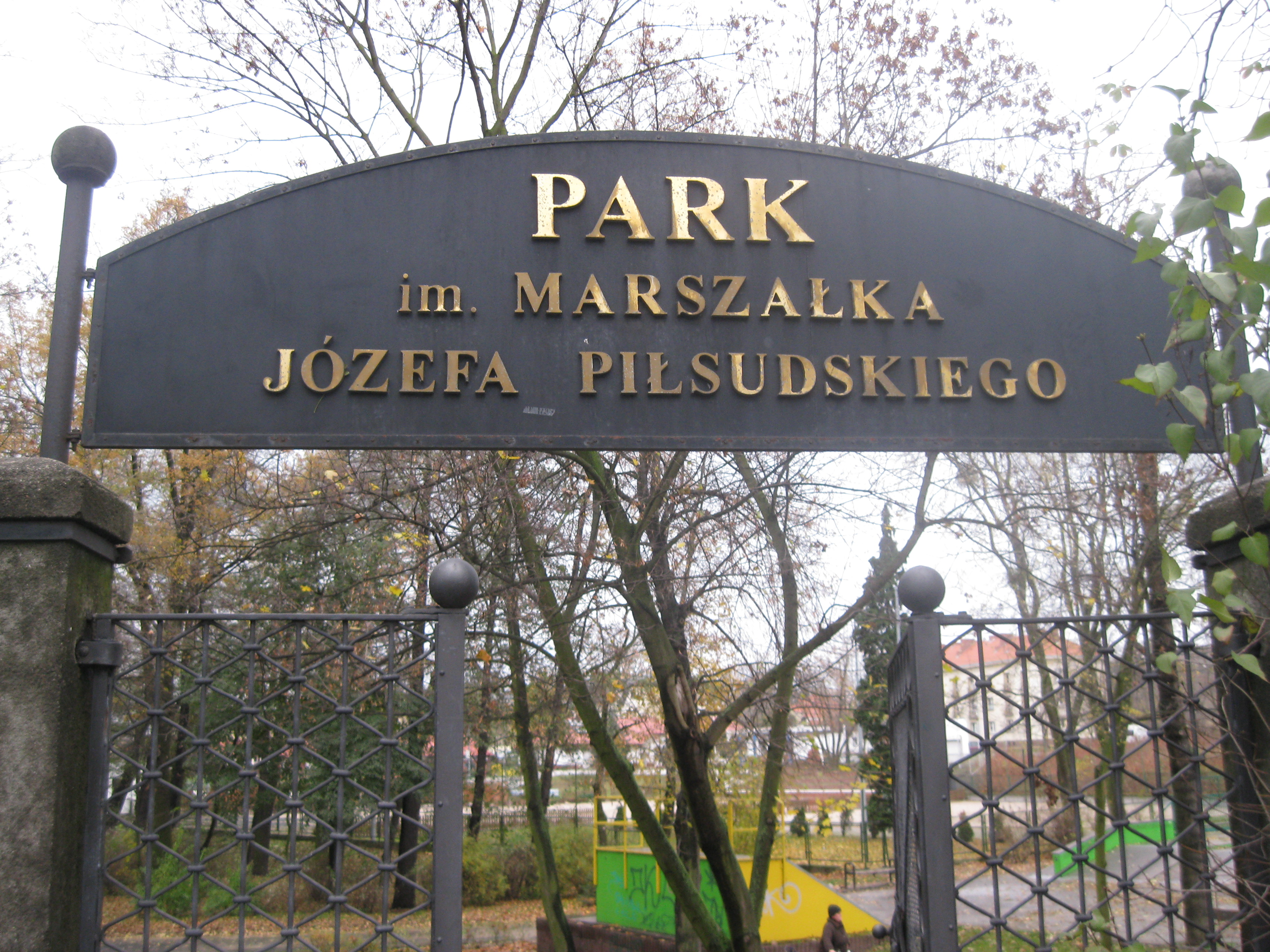
- Park entrance
- Interactive map of Marshal Józef Piłsudski Park, Września
- Location: Września, Poland
- Coordinates: 52°19′51″N 17°33′31″E
- Area: about 10 hectares (25 acres)
- Created: June 16th, 1927

Park im. Marszałka Józefa Piłsudskiego, Września (English: Marshal Józef Piłsudski Park, Września) is a park and memorial in Września, Poland. It has an area of about 10 hectares (25 acres). The park is managed by Gmina Września.

The park features a pond, playgrounds, natural monuments and sports facilities. In 2002, a municipal swimming pool, which serves as a skating rink during winter, was built in the neighbourhood of the park. A skatepark was added in 2006.

== Location ==
The park is located in the northern part of the city. The main entrance to the park in the form of a gate and stairs is located on the side of Daszyński street. It is bordered by Parkowa street and the river Wrześnica.

== History ==
In 1925, the city began the construction of the city park with an area of 6.63 hectares (16.4 acres) at the intersection of Gniezno street and Dworcowa street. For this purpose, the land was purchased from Helena Mycielska. The project was overseen by the director of urban gardens in Poznan Dr. Wladyslaw Marciniec. The plan provided for flower beds, tennis courts, children's playgrounds, a restaurant building and nursery trees. The park became available to residents on the day of Corpus Christi, June 16, 1927. It was initially named Wiosna Ludów (Polish Revolution of 1848), and in 1935 was renamed after Józef Piłsudski. About 500 trees and more than 7 thousand shrubs were planted in the park and in 1927-1928 more than 30 benches were purchased. Edward Grabski from Bieganowo presented the park with three statues the god of thunder-Perkun, the god of conflagration-Jesse and the goddess of war-Bellona.

== Nature ==
In the park, there are a variety of species of trees and shrubs, both deciduous and coniferous. There are 43 species of trees and 21 species of shrubs, but the park is dominated by alder and black poplar as well as oak, maple, plane and black walnut. In the central part of the park there is a small pond.

Natural monuments include an erratic block of granite.

== Gallery ==
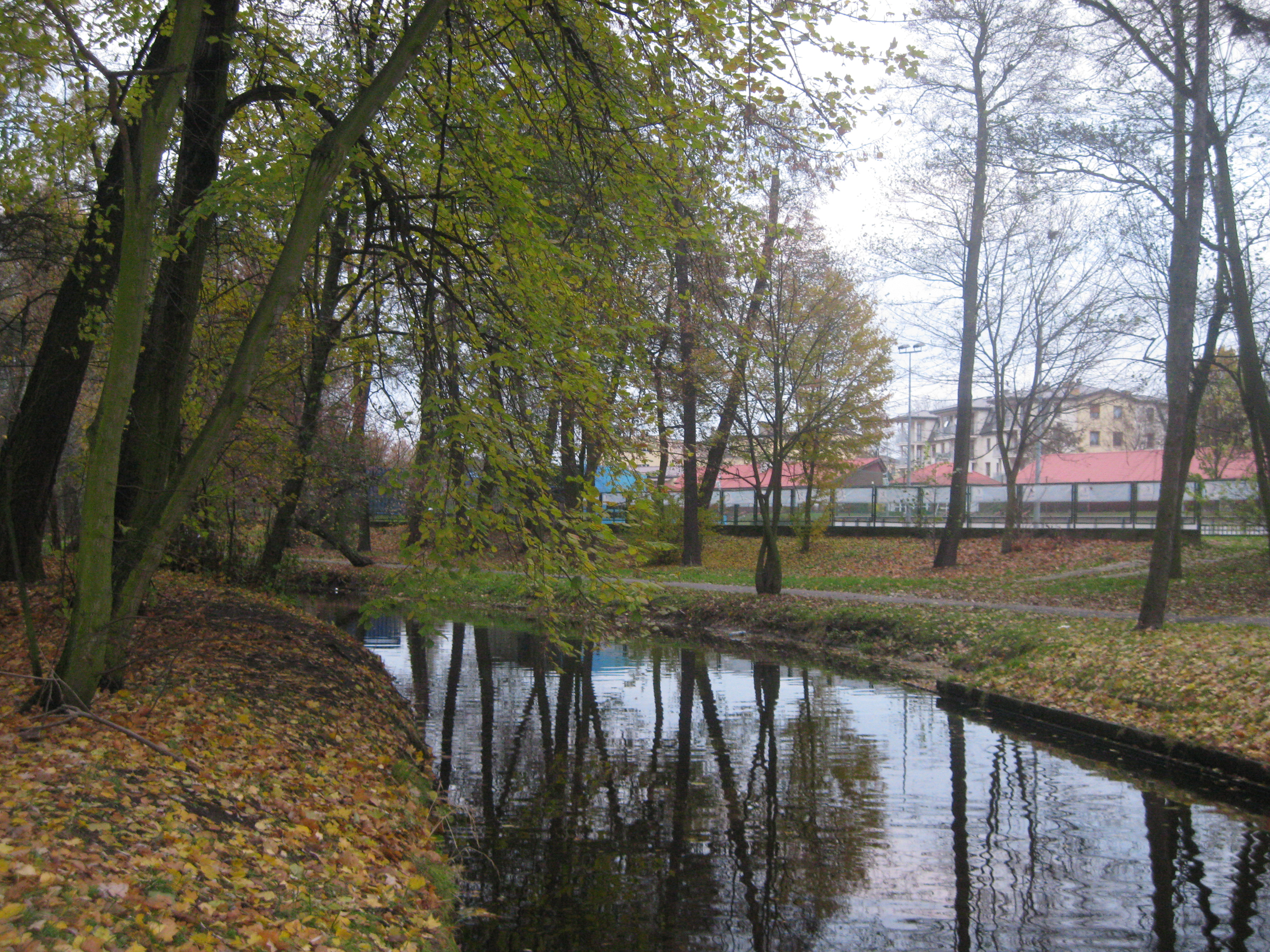
Wrześnica flowing through the park

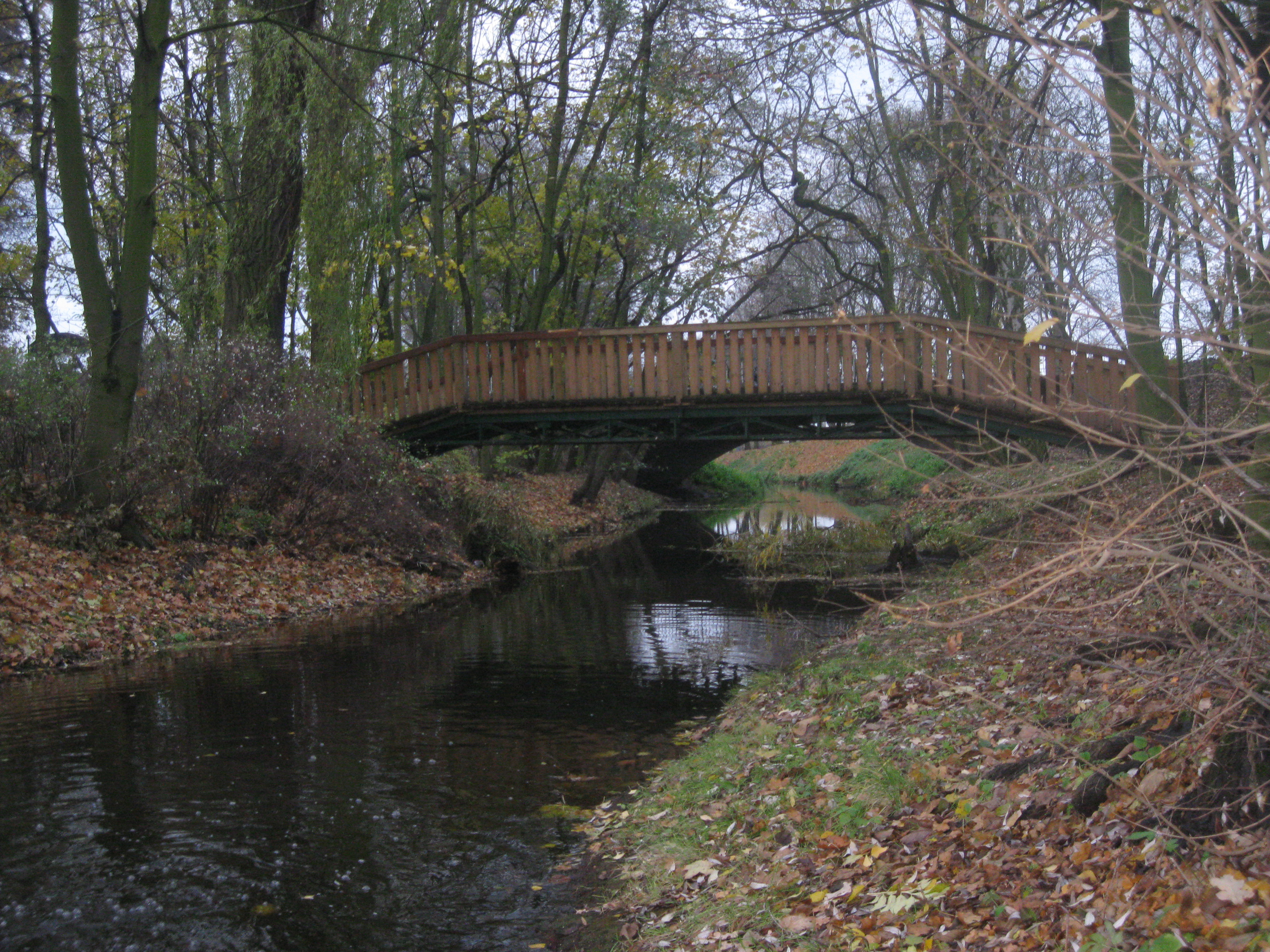
bridge over Wrześnica

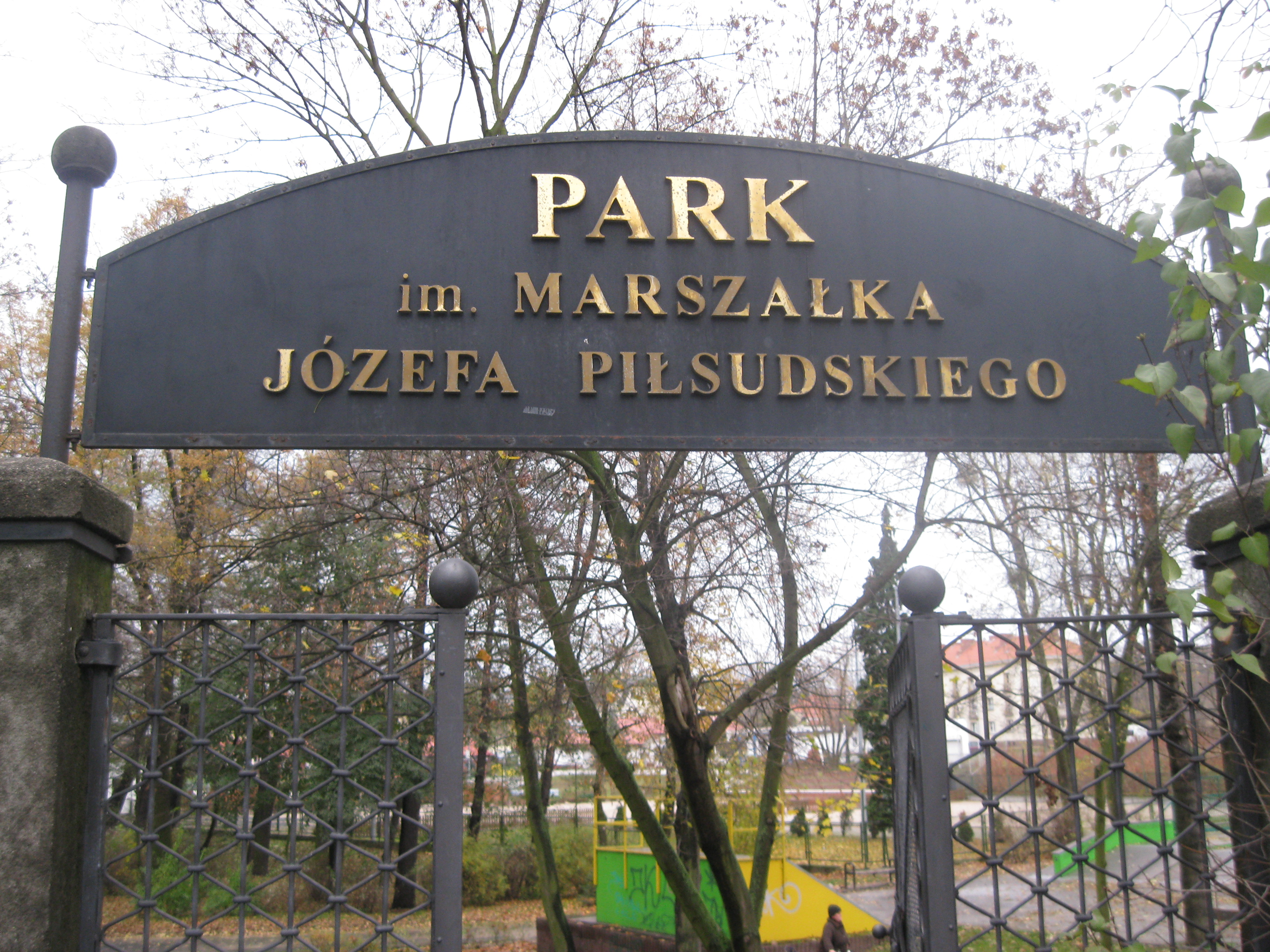
signboard above the entrance to the Park

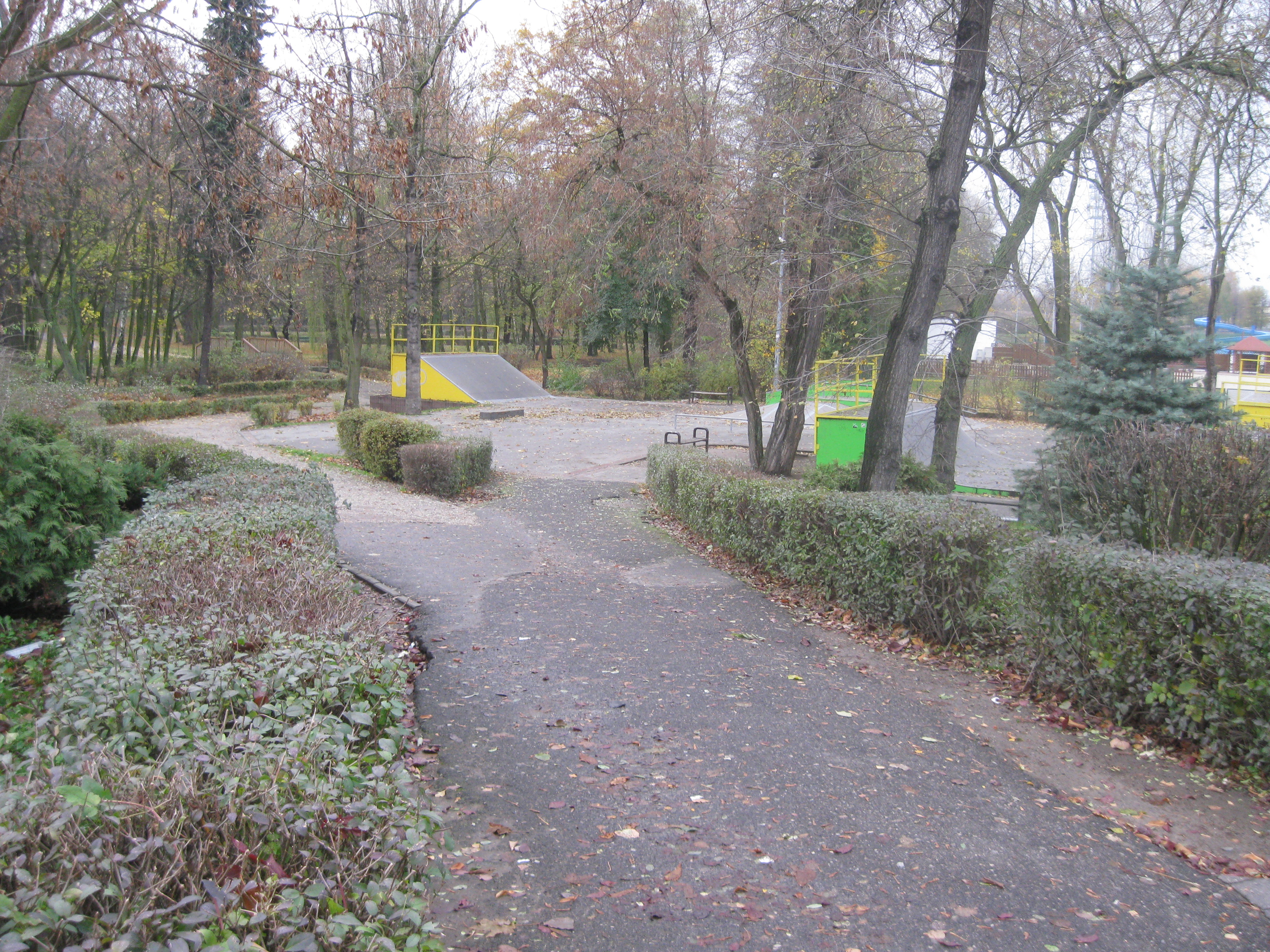
skate park

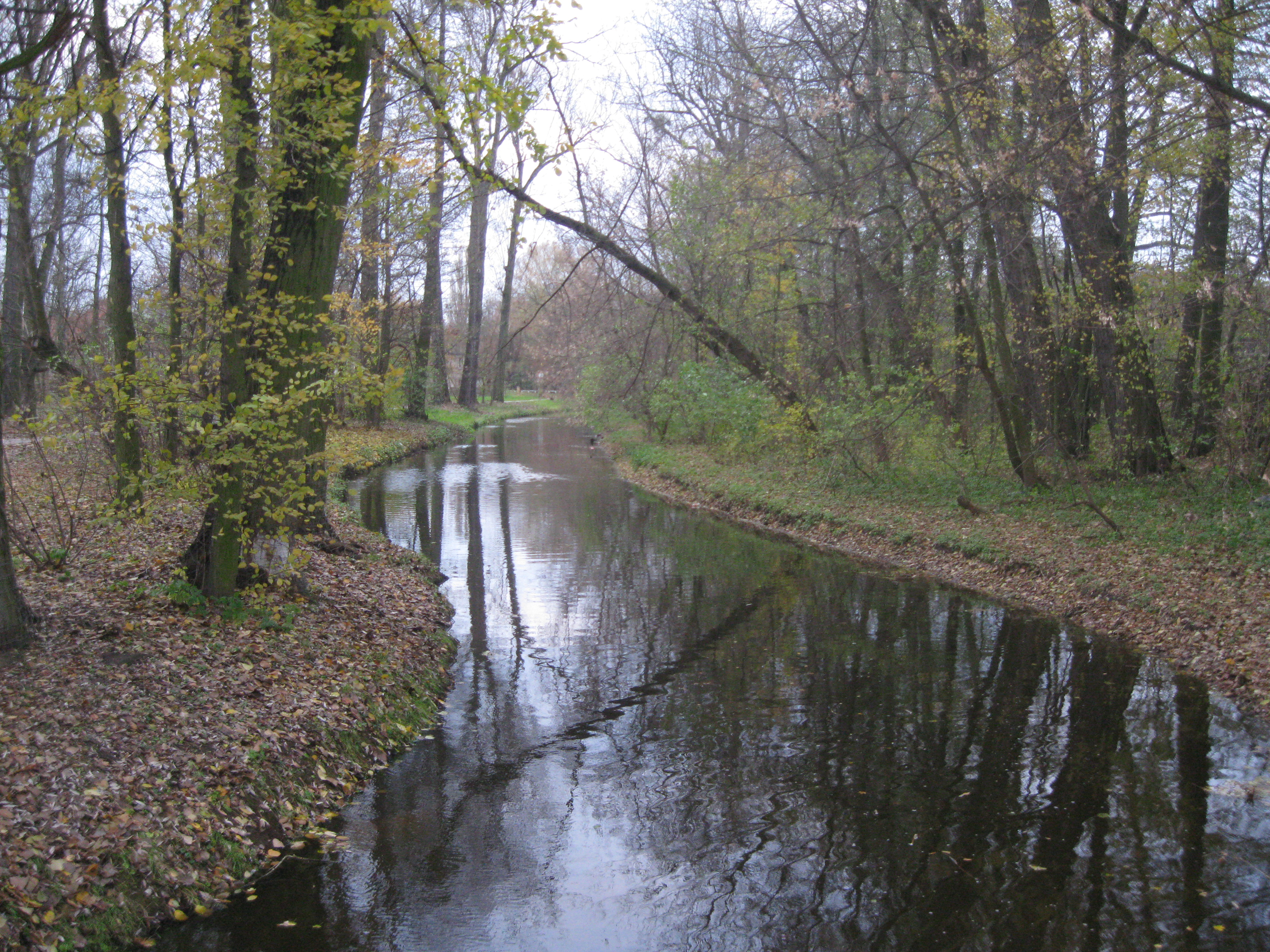
Wrześnica flowing through the park

== Sources ==
- (in Polish) History of the Park im. Marszałka Józefa Piłsudskiego, Września
- (in Polish) Park im. Marszałka Józefa Piłsudskiego, Września photo gallery
