= Kosmowo, Greater Poland Voivodeship =

Kosmowo
- Village
- Location within Poland
- Coordinates: 52°27′28″N 17°32′49″E
- Country: Poland
- Voivodeship: Greater Poland
- County: Gniezno
- Gmina: Czerniejewo

Kosmowo [kɔsˈmɔvɔ] is a village in the administrative district of Gmina Czerniejewo, within Gniezno County, Greater Poland Voivodeship, in west-central Poland.
