= Pawłowo, Gniezno County =

Pawłowo
- Village
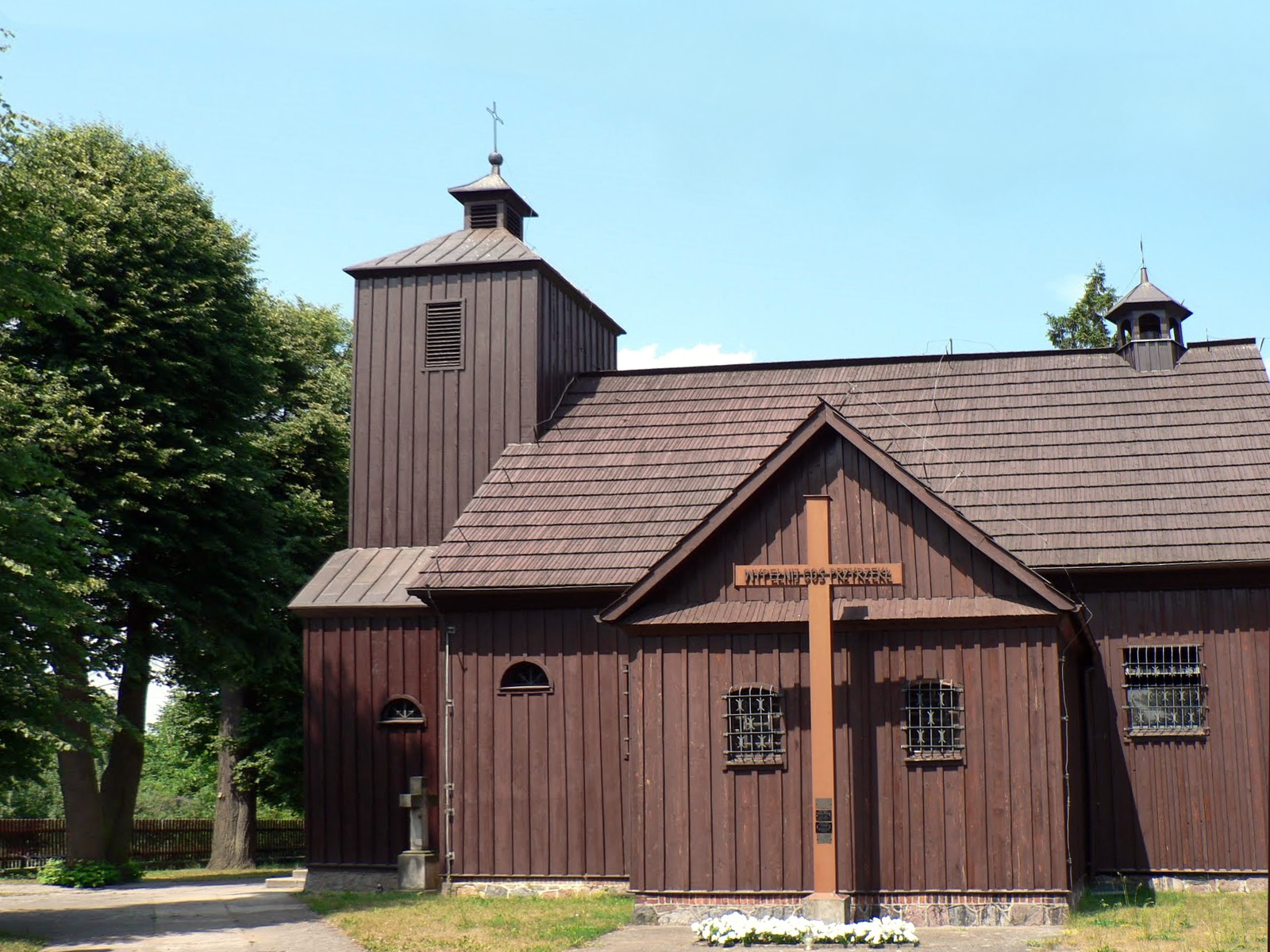
- A church in Pawłowo

- Location within Poland
- Coordinates: 52°28′52″N 17°30′53″E
- Country: Poland
- Voivodeship: Greater Poland
- County: Gniezno
- Gmina: Czerniejewo
- Population: 300

Pawłowo [paˈvwɔvɔ] is a village in the administrative district of Gmina Czerniejewo, within Gniezno County, Greater Poland Voivodeship, in west-central Poland.
