= Kąpiel, Gniezno County =

Kąpiel
- Village
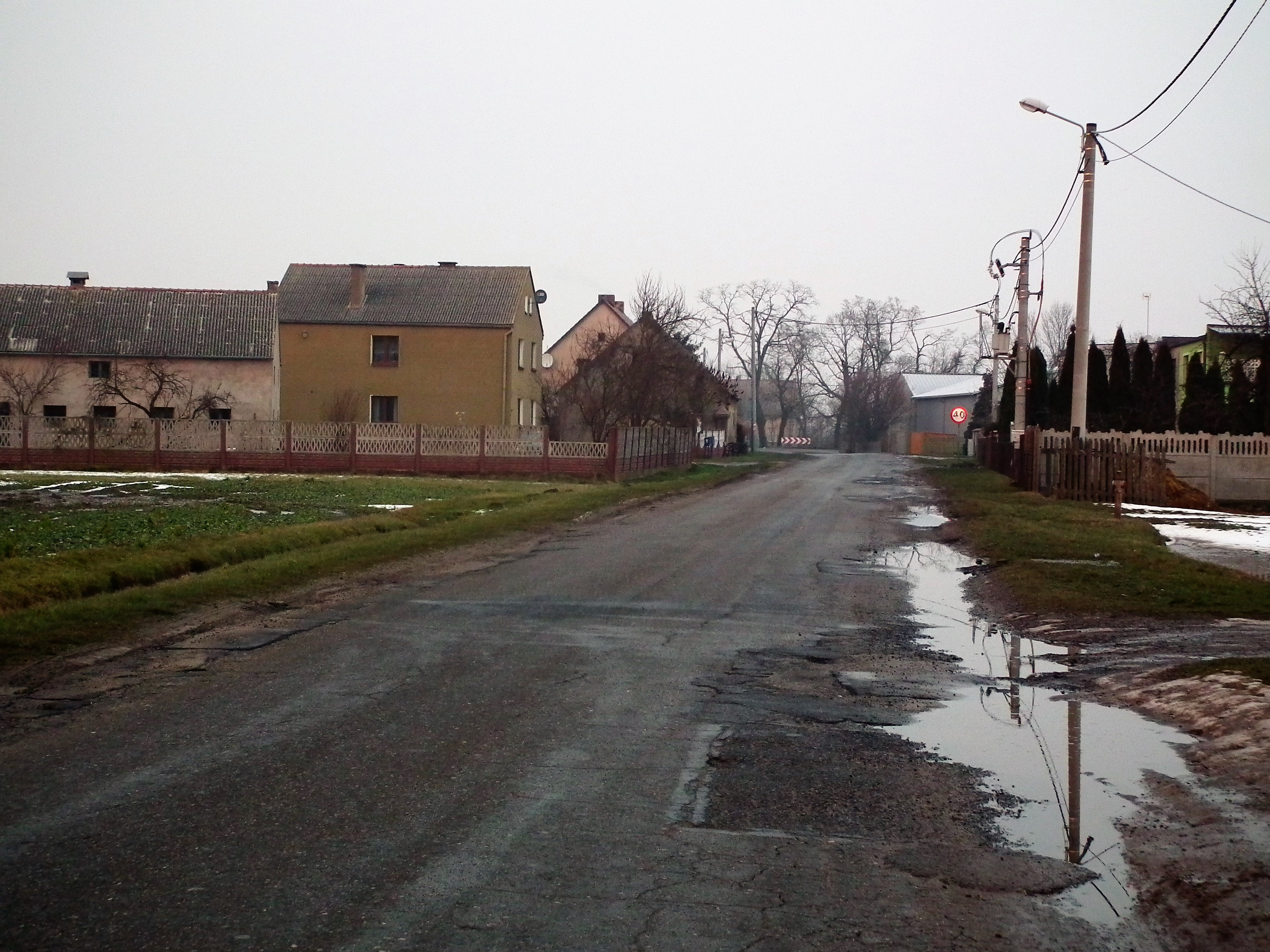

- Location within Poland
- Coordinates: 52°26′N 17°31′E
- Country: Poland
- Voivodeship: Greater Poland
- County: Gniezno
- Gmina: Czerniejewo

Kąpiel [ˈkɔmpjɛl] is a village in the administrative district of Gmina Czerniejewo, within Gniezno County, Greater Poland Voivodeship, in west-central Poland.
