= Goraniec =

- Village
- Location within Poland
- Coordinates: 52°26′41″N 17°32′52″E
- Country: Poland
- Voivodeship: Greater Poland
- County: Gniezno
- Gmina: Czerniejewo

Goraniec [ɡɔˈraɲɛt͡s] is a village in the administrative district of Gmina Czerniejewo, within Gniezno County, Greater Poland Voivodeship, in west-central Poland.
