= Kosowo, Gniezno County =

Kosowo
- Village
- Location within Poland
- Coordinates: 52°26′N 17°34′E
- Country: Poland
- Voivodeship: Greater Poland
- County: Gniezno
- Gmina: Czerniejewo

Kosowo [kɔˈsɔvɔ] is a village in Gmina Czerniejewo, within Gniezno County, Greater Poland Voivodeship, in west-central Poland.
