= Graby, Greater Poland Voivodeship =

Graby
- Village
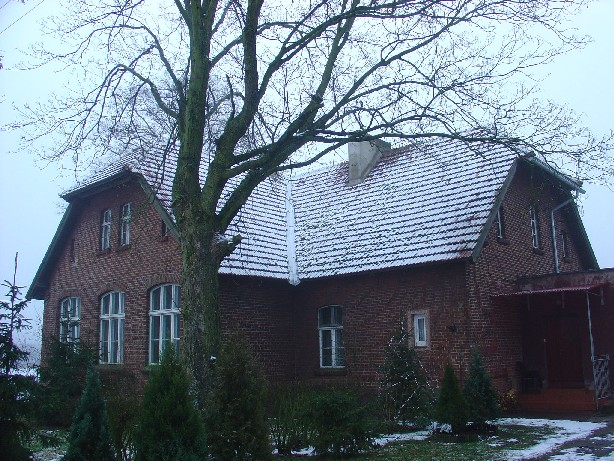
- A former school and library in Graby

- Location within Poland
- Coordinates: 52°25′N 17°26′E
- Country: Poland
- Voivodeship: Greater Poland
- County: Gniezno
- Gmina: Czerniejewo

Graby [ˈɡrabɨ] is a village in the administrative district of Gmina Czerniejewo, within Gniezno County, Greater Poland Voivodeship, in west-central Poland.
