= Gmina Czerniejewo =

Gmina Czerniejewo Czerniejewo Commune
- Gmina
- Coat of arms
- Interactive map of Gmina Czerniejewo
- Coordinates (Czerniejewo): 52°26′N 17°29′E
- Country: Poland
- Voivodeship: Greater Poland
- County: Gniezno
- Seat: Czerniejewo

Area
  - Total: 112.01 km^{2} (43.25 sq mi)

Population (2006)
  - Total: 6,913
  - Density: 61.72/km^{2} (159.8/sq mi)
  - Urban: 2,556
  - Rural: 4,357
- Website: http://www.czerniejewo.com.pl

Gmina Czerniejewo is an urban-rural gmina (administrative district) in Gniezno County, Greater Poland Voivodeship, in west-central Poland. Its seat is the town of Czerniejewo, which lies approximately 14 kilometres (9 mi) south-west of Gniezno and 39 km (24 mi) east of the regional capital Poznań.

The gmina covers an area of 112.01 square kilometres (43.2 sq mi), and as of 2006 its total population is 6,913 (out of which the population of Czerniejewo amounts to 2,556, and the population of the rural part of the gmina is 4,357).

== Villages ==
Apart from the town of Czerniejewo, Gmina Czerniejewo contains the villages and settlements of Czeluścin, Gębarzewko, Gębarzewo, Golimowo, Goraniec, Goranin, Graby, Kąpiel, Kosmowo, Kosowo, Nidom, Pakszyn, Pakszynek, Pawłowo, Rakowo, Szczytniki Czerniejewskie and Żydowo.

== Neighbouring gminas ==
Gmina Czerniejewo is bordered by the town of Gniezno and by the gminas of Gniezno, Łubowo, Nekla, Niechanowo, Pobiedziska and Września.
