= Wrześnica River =

Polish river

Coordinates: 52°11′49″N 17°46′19″E

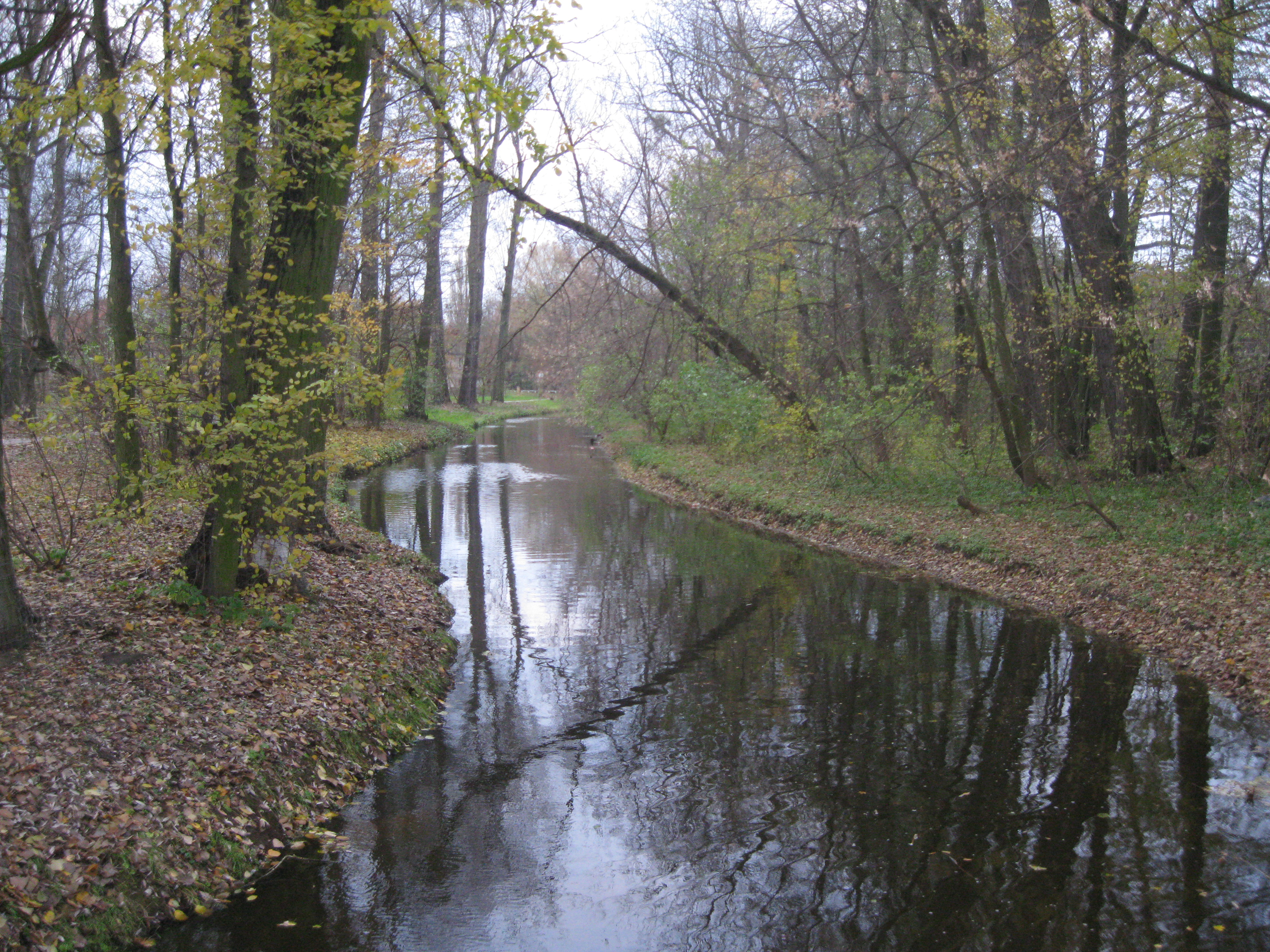
The Wrześnica River flowing through Park im. Marszałka Józefa Piłsudskiego, Września

The Wrześnica is a 49-kilometer (30.4 mi)-long, right (or northern) tributary of the Warta in Poland. Its river basin covers an area of 355 km^{2}. It has its source near Piekary, a suburb of Gniezno. It meets the Warta near the village of Samarzewo. Important cities along the Wrześnica river include Czerniejewo, Września.

Close to the city of Września, the artificial Wrzesińskie Lake was created on the river, colloquially also called the Lipówka Reservoir.
