= Nidom =

- Village
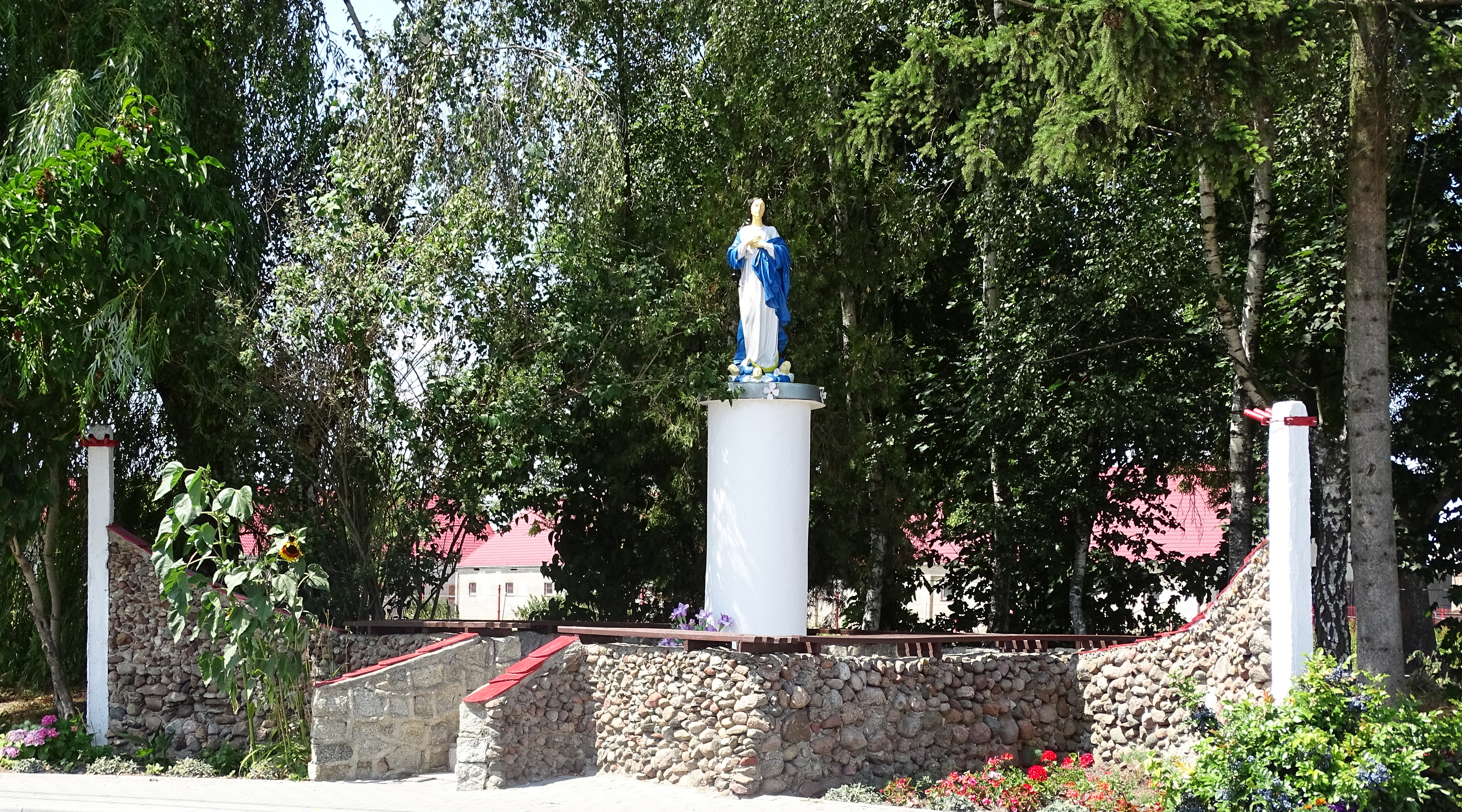
- The roadside shrine

- Location within Poland
- Coordinates: 52°27′N 17°32′E
- Country: Poland
- Voivodeship: Greater Poland
- County: Gniezno
- Gmina: Czerniejewo

Nidom [ˈnidɔm] is a village in the administrative district of Gmina Czerniejewo, within Gniezno County, Greater Poland Voivodeship, in west-central Poland.
