= Rakowo, Gniezno County =

Rakowo
- Village
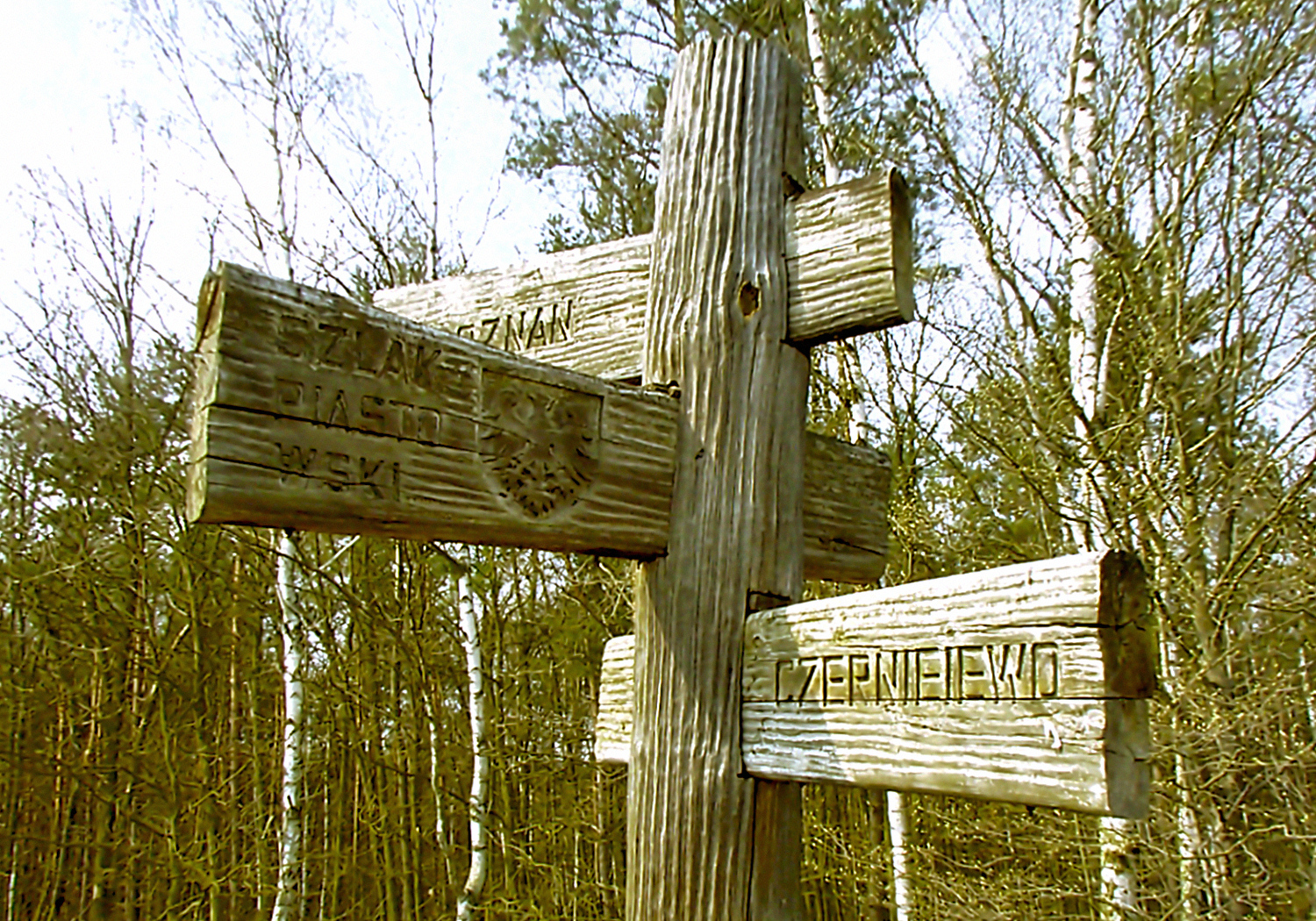
- Signpost of the Piast Trail in Rakowo, Gniezno County

- Location within Poland
- Coordinates: 52°25′49″N 17°25′34″E
- Country: Poland
- Voivodeship: Greater Poland
- County: Gniezno
- Gmina: Czerniejewo

Rakowo [raˈkɔvɔ] is a village in the administrative district of Gmina Czerniejewo, within Gniezno County, Greater Poland Voivodeship, in west-central Poland.
