= Czerniejewo =

Town in Greater Poland Voivodeship, Poland

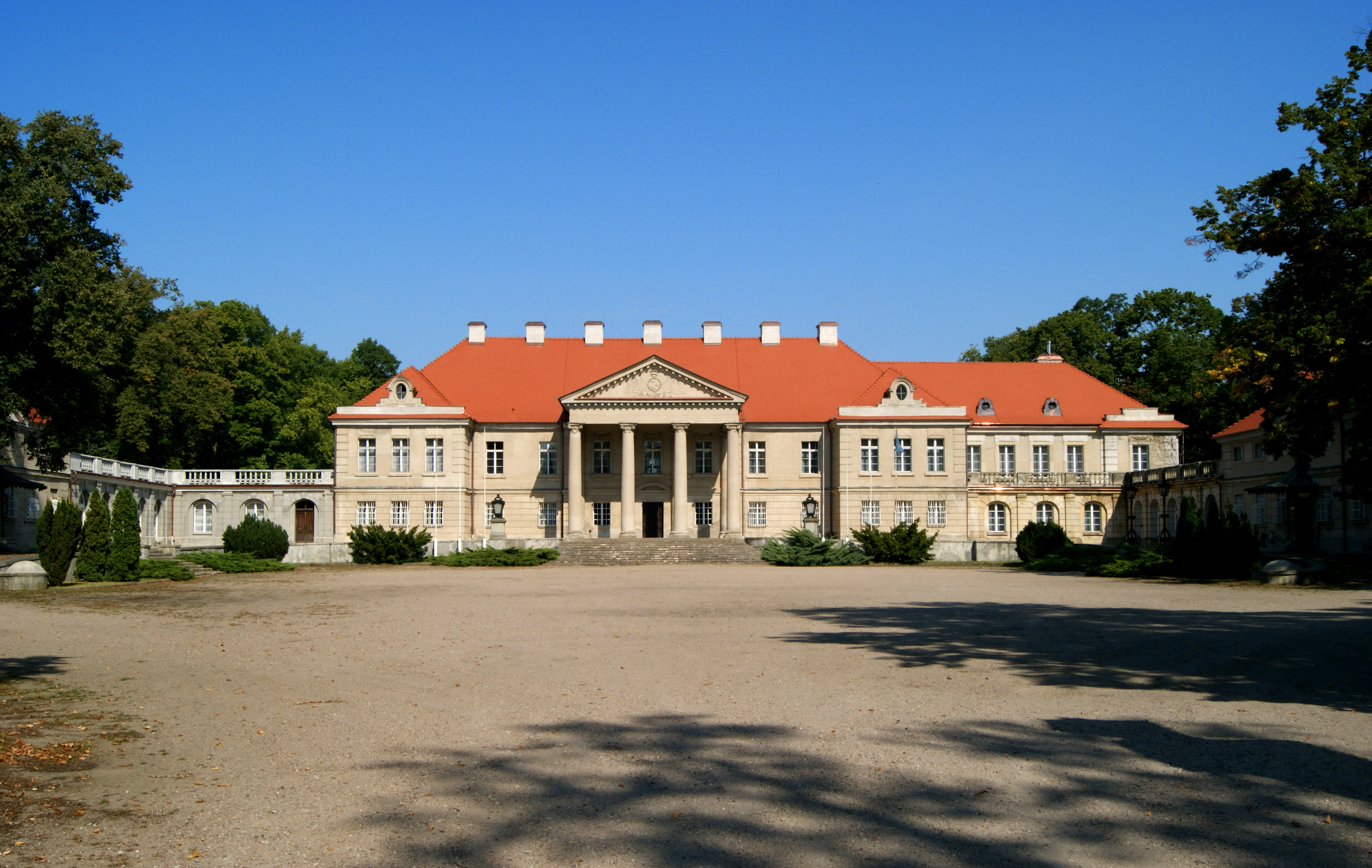
- Palace in Czerniejewo

- Coat of arms

- Location within Poland
- Coordinates: 52°26′N 17°29′E
- Country: Poland
- Voivodeship: Greater Poland
- County: Gniezno
- Gmina: Czerniejewo
- First mentioned: 1284
- Town rights: before 1390

Government
  - Mayor: Tadeusz Józef Szymanek

Area
  - Total: 10.2 km^{2} (3.9 sq mi)

Population (31 December 2021)
  - Total: 2,654
  - Density: 260/km^{2} (674/sq mi)
- Time zone: UTC+1 (CET)
  - Summer (DST): UTC+2 (CEST)
- Postal code: 62-250
- Area code: +48 61
- Car plates: PGN
- Climate: Dfb
- Website: http://www.czerniejewo.pl

Czerniejewo [t͡ʂɛrɲɛˈjɛvɔ] is a town and municipality in central Poland with 2,654 inhabitants as of December 2021. It is situated in Gniezno County, in the Greater Poland Voivodeship.

Czerniejewo is located on the Wrześnica River, in a predominantly farming area. It is 15 km (9 mi) from Gniezno, and 12 km (7 mi) from Września.

== History ==
Human settlement in Czerniejewo dates back to prehistoric times, however, the earliest mention of the settlement comes from 1284. It was a royal possession from then until 1386 when Polish King Władysław II Jagiełło gave it to Sędziwój Pałuka from Szubin. At that time the town already had the right to hold markets. By 1390 the town had full Magdeburg rights. In 1581 King Stephen Báthory granted the town the right to hold trade fairs. Czerniejewo was a private town of Polish nobility, administratively located in the Gniezno County in the Kalisz Voivodeship in the Greater Poland Province of the Kingdom of Poland. It often changed owners, among which were the Czarnkowski family (from 1594 to 1644) and the Opaliński family (from 1644 to 1726). In 1771 General Jan Lipski began building a palace, adjacent to the town, which was completed in 1780.

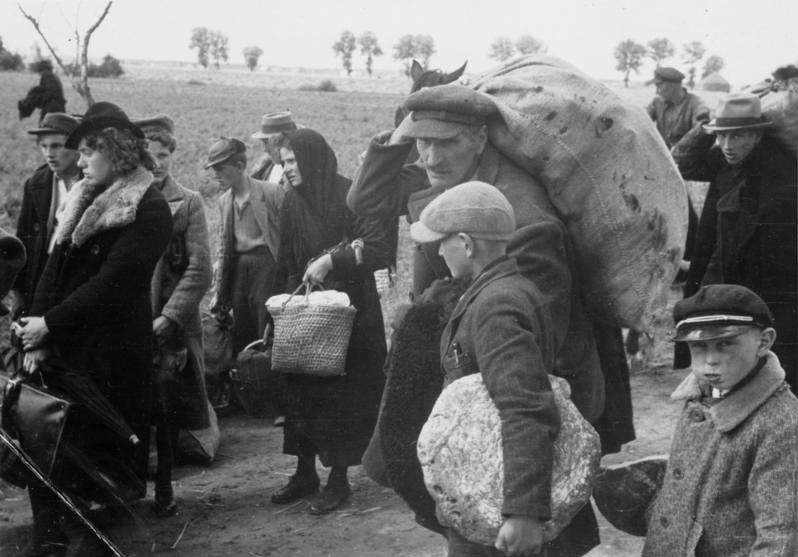
Expulsion of Poles by Nazi Germany in 1939

In the Second Partition of Poland, in 1793, Czerniejewo was annexed by Prussia, and was called Schwarzenau. Following the successful Greater Poland uprising of 1806, it was regained by Poles and included within the short-lived Duchy of Warsaw. In 1815 it was re-annexed by Prussia and made part of the Grand Duchy of Poznań. In 1871 it became part of Germany. The town was connected to the German railway system in 1875. In 1918, following World War I, Poland regained independence, and in 1918-1919 the inhabitants participated in the large Greater Poland Uprising (1918–1919), and the town was reintegrated with the reborn Polish state under its historic name Czerniejewo.

During the invasion of Poland, which started World War II in September 1939, the town was invaded and then occupied by Germany. The first expulsions of local Polish inhabitants were carried out by the occupiers in November and December 1939. The local Polish police chief and another Polish policeman from Czerniejewo were murdered by the Russians in the Katyn massacre in 1940. In January 1945, the Red Army captured the town, and afterwards it was restored to Poland.

== Demographics ==
Historical population

Year	Pop.	±%
1843	1,297	—
1871	1,598	+23.2%
1880	1,575	−1.4%
1890	1,458	−7.4%
1900	1,324	−9.2%
1910	1,427	+7.8%

Year	Pop.	±%
1921	1,343	−5.9%
1931	1,392	+3.6%
1939	1,587	+14.0%
1950	1,230	−22.5%
1960	1,928	+56.7%
2010	2,598	+34.8%

== Notable residents ==
- Onufry Kopczyński (1736–1817), educator and grammarian of the Polish language during the Polish Enlightenment

== Gallery ==
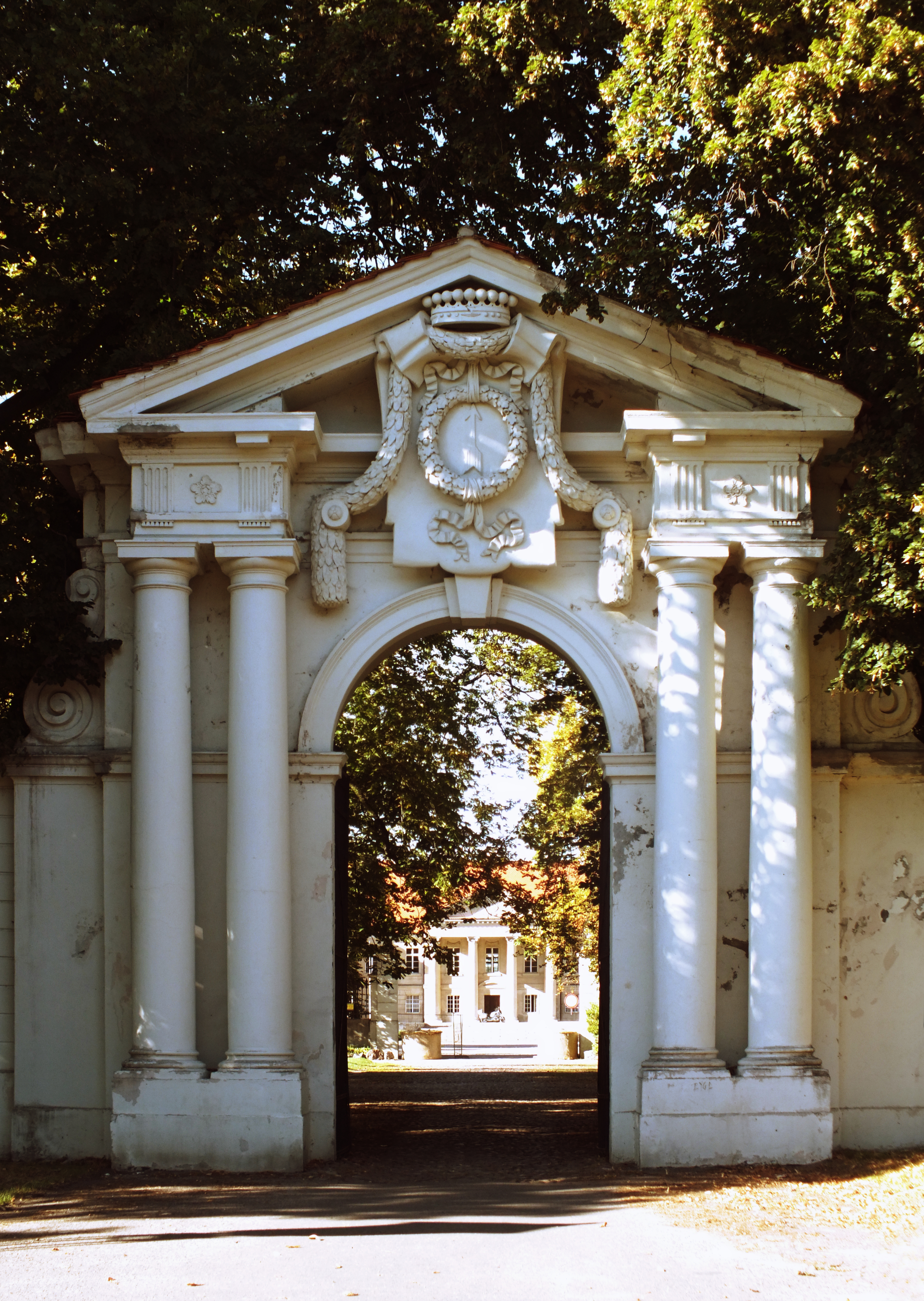
Main gate to the Lipski Palace

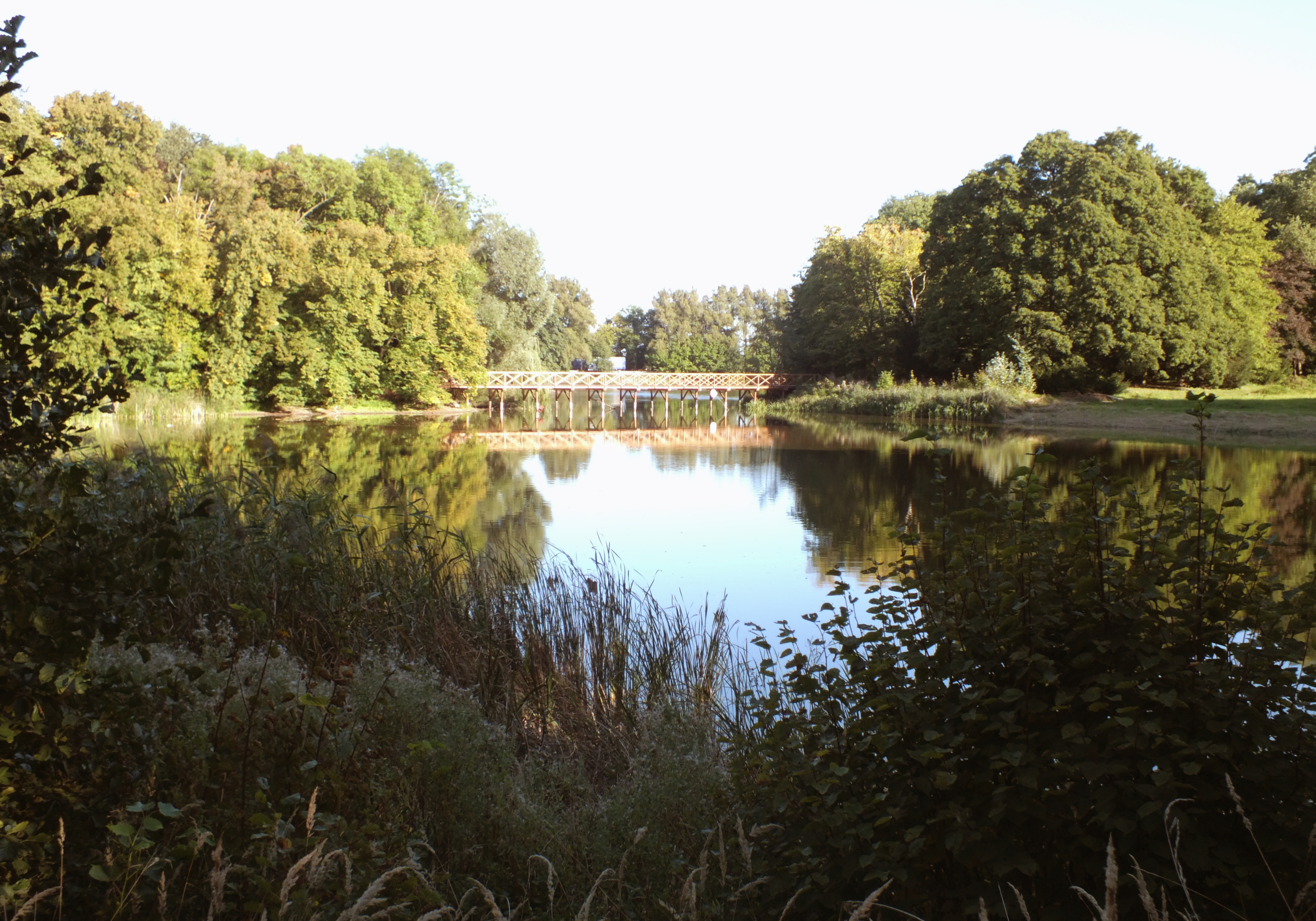
Piła pond in the Palace Park

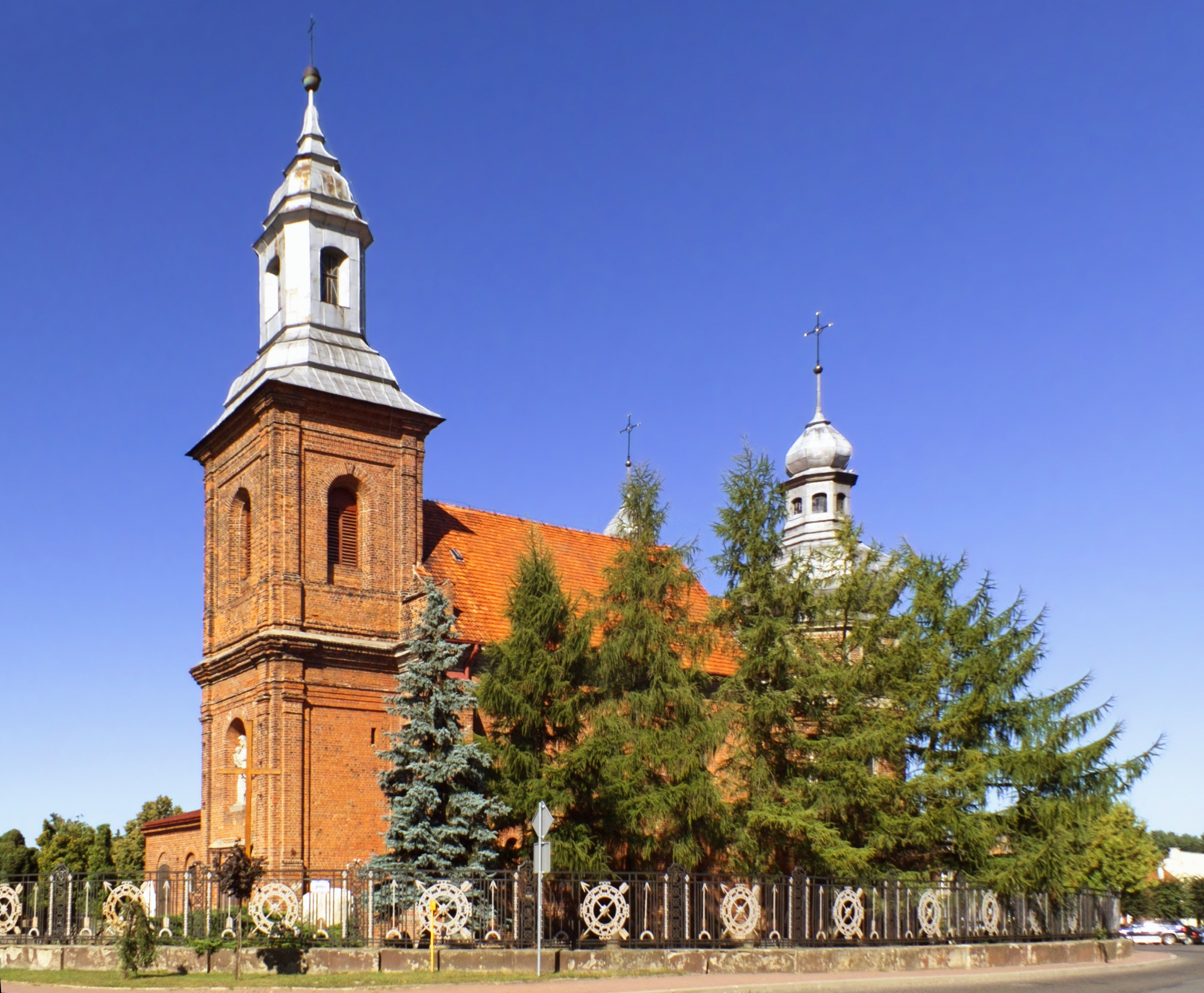
Saint John the Baptist church

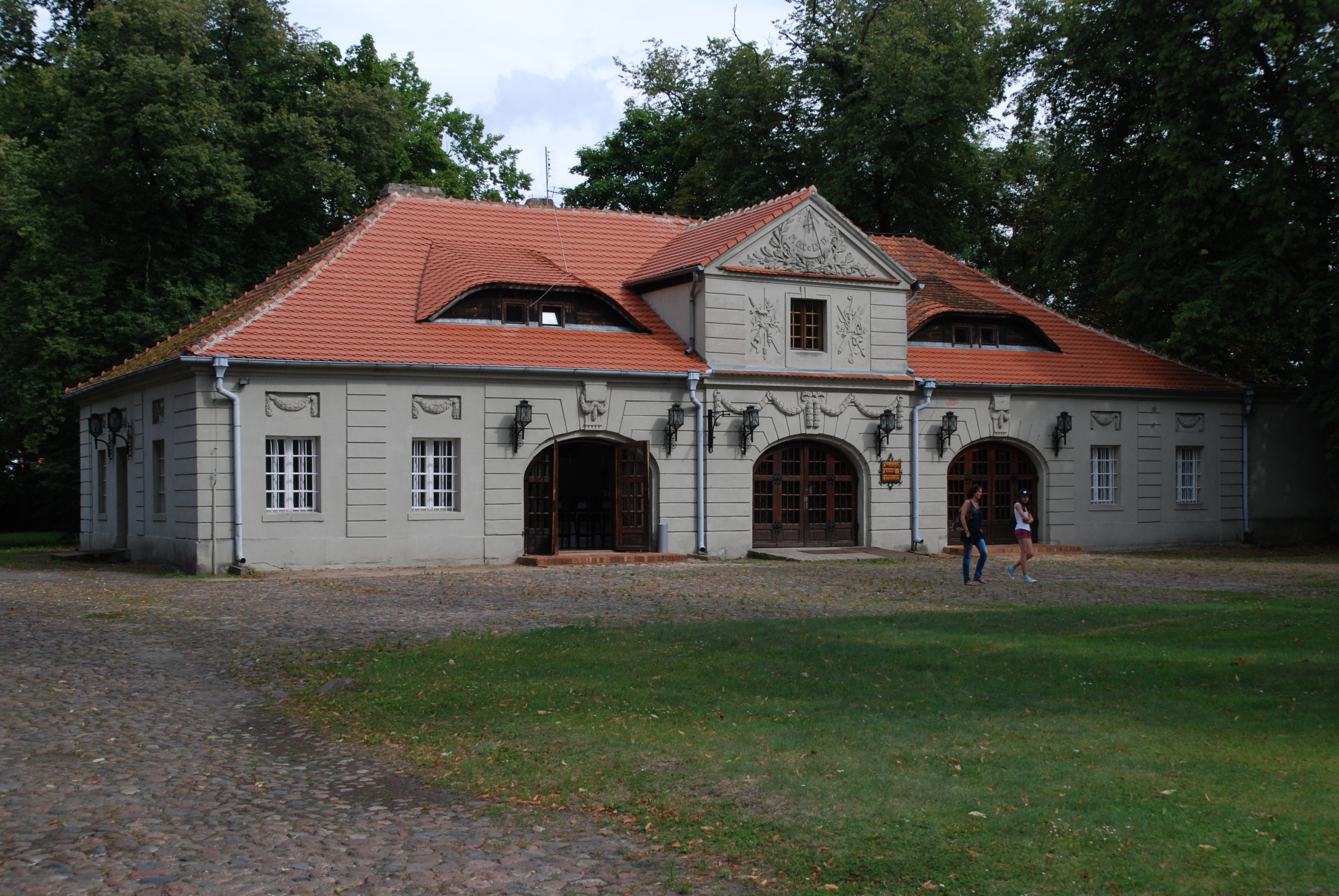
Old carriage house
