= Czeluścin, Gniezno County =

Czeluścin
- Village
- Location within Poland
- Coordinates: 52°24′17″N 17°34′55″E
- Country: Poland
- Voivodeship: Greater Poland
- County: Gniezno
- Gmina: Czerniejewo
- Population: 135

Czeluścin [t͡ʂɛˈluɕt͡ɕin] is a village in the administrative district of Gmina Czerniejewo, within Gniezno County, Greater Poland Voivodeship, in west-central Poland.

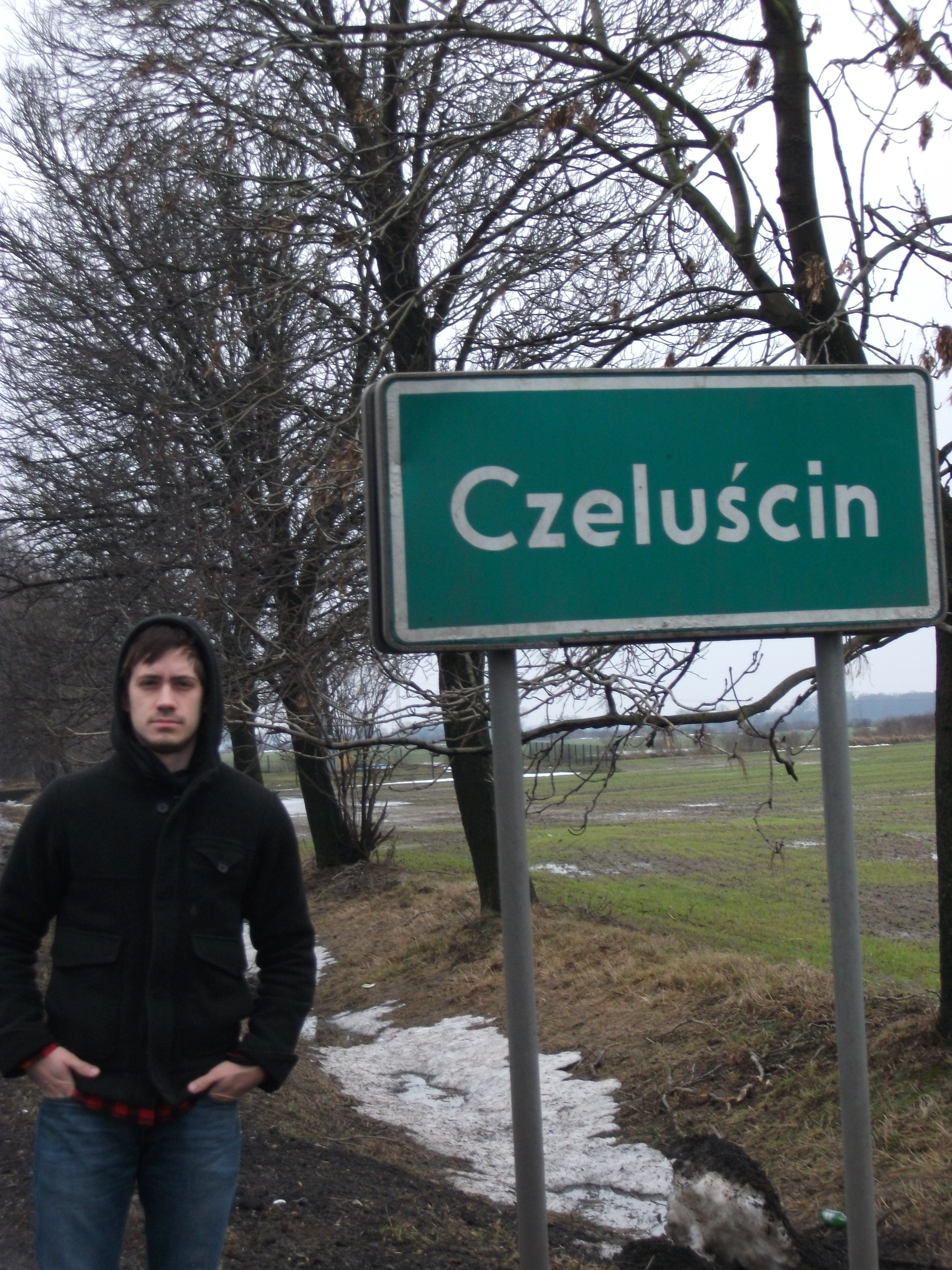
Sign when entering Czeluścin along Route 15
