= Żydowo, Gniezno County =

Żydowo
- Village
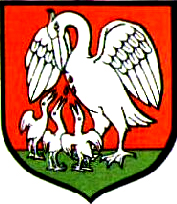
- Coat of arms

- Location within Poland
- Coordinates: 52°27′7″N 17°35′23″E
- Country: Poland
- Voivodeship: Greater Poland
- County: Gniezno
- Gmina: Czerniejewo
- Population: 1,988

Żydowo [ʐɨˈdɔvɔ] is a village in the administrative district of Gmina Czerniejewo, within Gniezno County, Greater Poland Voivodeship, in west-central Poland.
