= Gębarzewo, Greater Poland Voivodeship =

Gębarzewo
- Village
- Location within Poland
- Coordinates: 52°28′N 17°34′E
- Country: Poland
- Voivodeship: Greater Poland
- County: Gniezno
- Gmina: Czerniejewo

Gębarzewo [ɡɛmbaˈʐɛvɔ] is a village in the administrative district of Gmina Czerniejewo, within Gniezno County, Greater Poland Voivodeship, in west-central Poland.
