= Henryk Sienkiewicz Park, Włocławek =

Park in Włocławek, Poland

Coordinates: 52°39′38″N 19°03′40″E

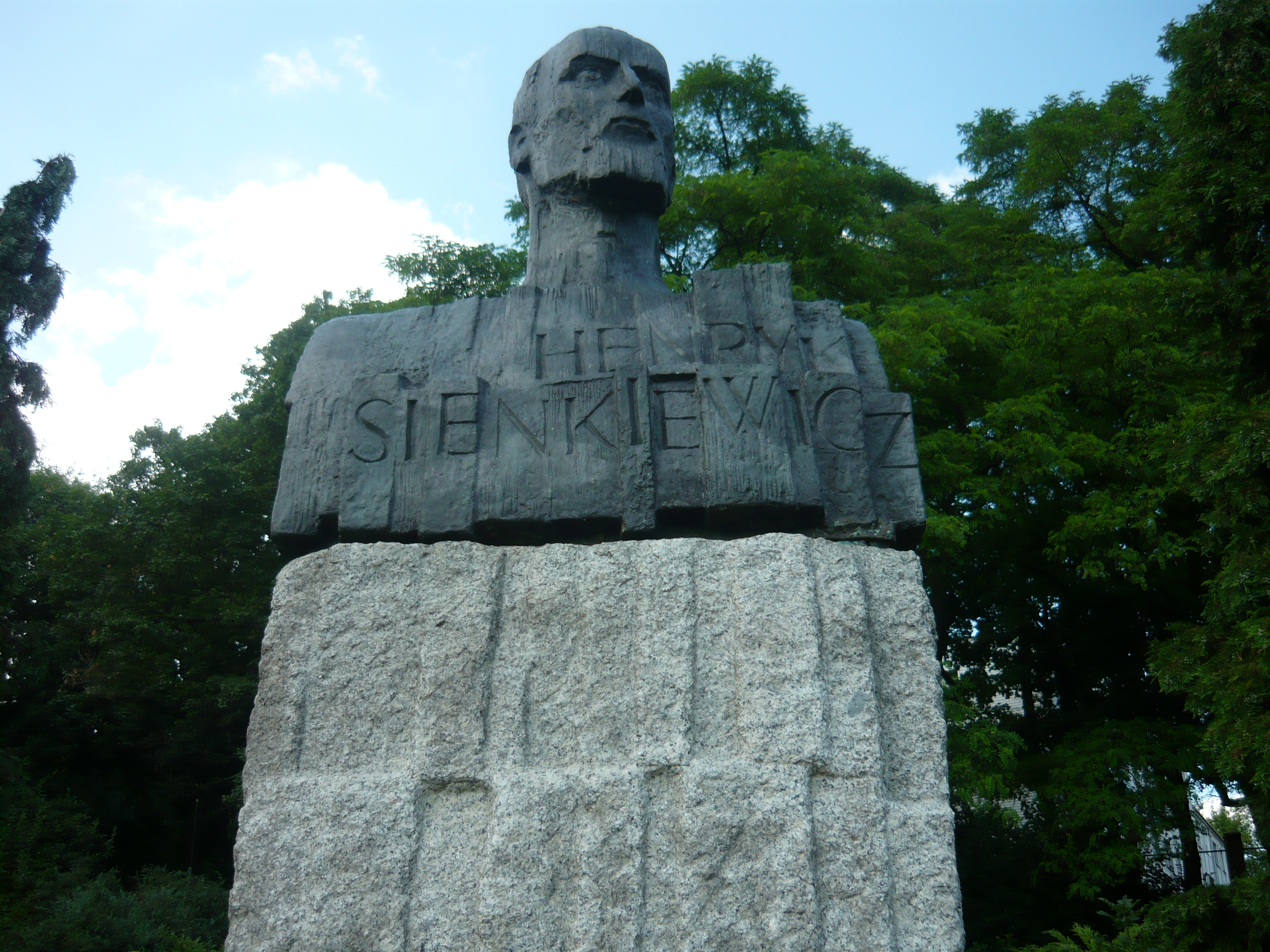
Henryk Sienkiewicz's bust in the centre of the park

The Henryk Sienkiewicz Park in Włocławek is one of the oldest city parks in Poland.

== History ==
This is the third city park that was established in Włocławek. Previous attempts to establish a city park include the first park set up in 1824 in the area adjacent to the Franciscan monastery and St. Adalbert's Church (near today's Słowackiego Street). Due to excessively sandy land on which the park was built, it was liquidated in 1830. The second park was created on the area of today's Freedom Square. A garden was planted here in the years 1841–1845, later called the "Saxon Garden". It had an area of 8044 m^{2}. Part of the garden was liquidated in 1905 due to the construction of St. Nicholas' Orthodox Church. Finally it was closed down together with the demolition of said church.

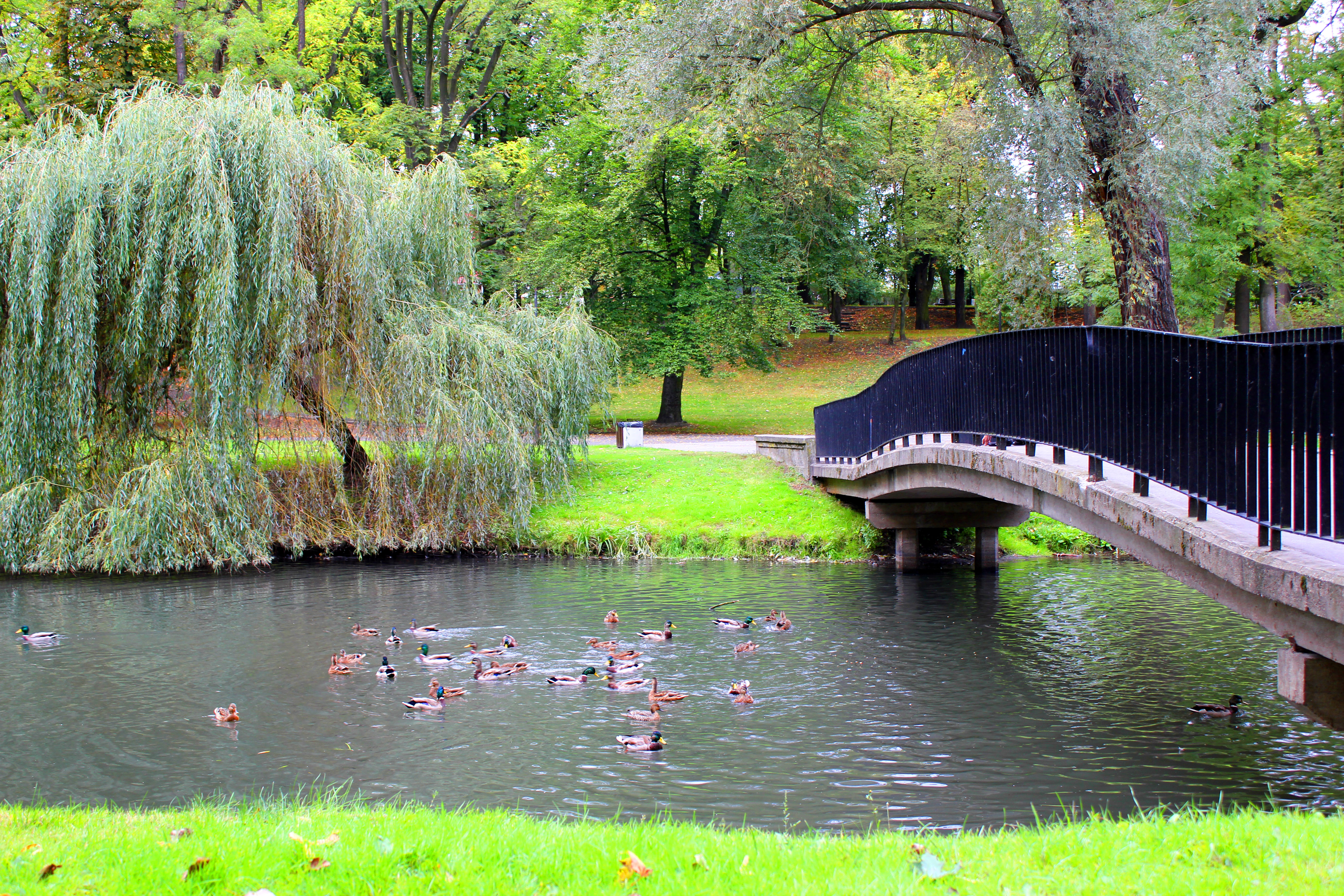
H. Sienkiewicz City Park in Włocławek

The present-day park was established in 1870. Originally it occupied only a small area on the right bank of the Zgłowiączka river. It was created on a completely uninhabited slope of the river. The expansion project was carried out after 1916 by the famous English-style gardener Franciszek Szanior. During the Second Republic of Poland it was extended and ultimately covered 23,446 m^{2}. In the years 1926-1939 the park was extended up to the railway bridge.

In 1923, a kiosk was set up in the park where fruit could be purchased. In 1925 an acoustical shell was set up, which was the beginning of the later established amphitheatre. The amphitheater operated until the end of the 20th century. It hosted important events for Włocławek, both cultural, as well as concerts and festivals. At the beginning of the 21st century the amphitheater was abandoned and fell into ruin. It was demolished in 2006, along with the adjacent 'Parkowa' café. In 2008 a playground was built in its place, which met with negative opinions from the residents.

During the 1920s a greenhouse for plants also existed in the park. In 1924, a monument to Colonel Bechi (who also has his own street in Włocławek) was unveiled, however, it was demolished in 1939.

In the next decade, the park was equipped with, among other things, a confectionery and a radio megaphone.

== Description ==
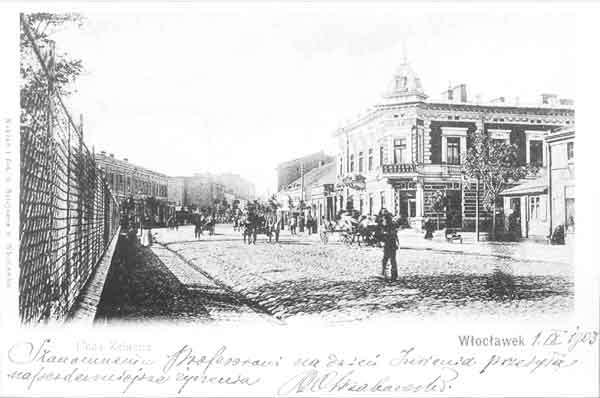
Today's Plac Wolności (Freedom Square) on a photograph by Bolesław Sztejner dated prior to 1902. To the left is the fence of the Saxon Garden.

The park is located at the mouth of the Zgłowiączka River to the Vistula River, in the city centre, next to the Cathedral of the Assumption of the Blessed Virgin Mary.

There is a bust of Henryk Sienkiewicz in the centre of the park. The writer became a patron of the park in 1916. This was a reaction of local residents to the news of death of this outstanding writer, who was involved in helping the soldiers of the First World War. Sienkiewicz visited Włocławek between 1903 and 1904, in connection with a flood that hit the town. He read one of the chapters of his novella. The writer's stay was also connected with his acceptance of the honorary membership of the Włocławek Rowing Society.

The area of the park is 40.18 hectares, and the density of trees and shrubs is about 200 pieces/hectare. There are 65 tree species in the park, most of them (53) deciduous.

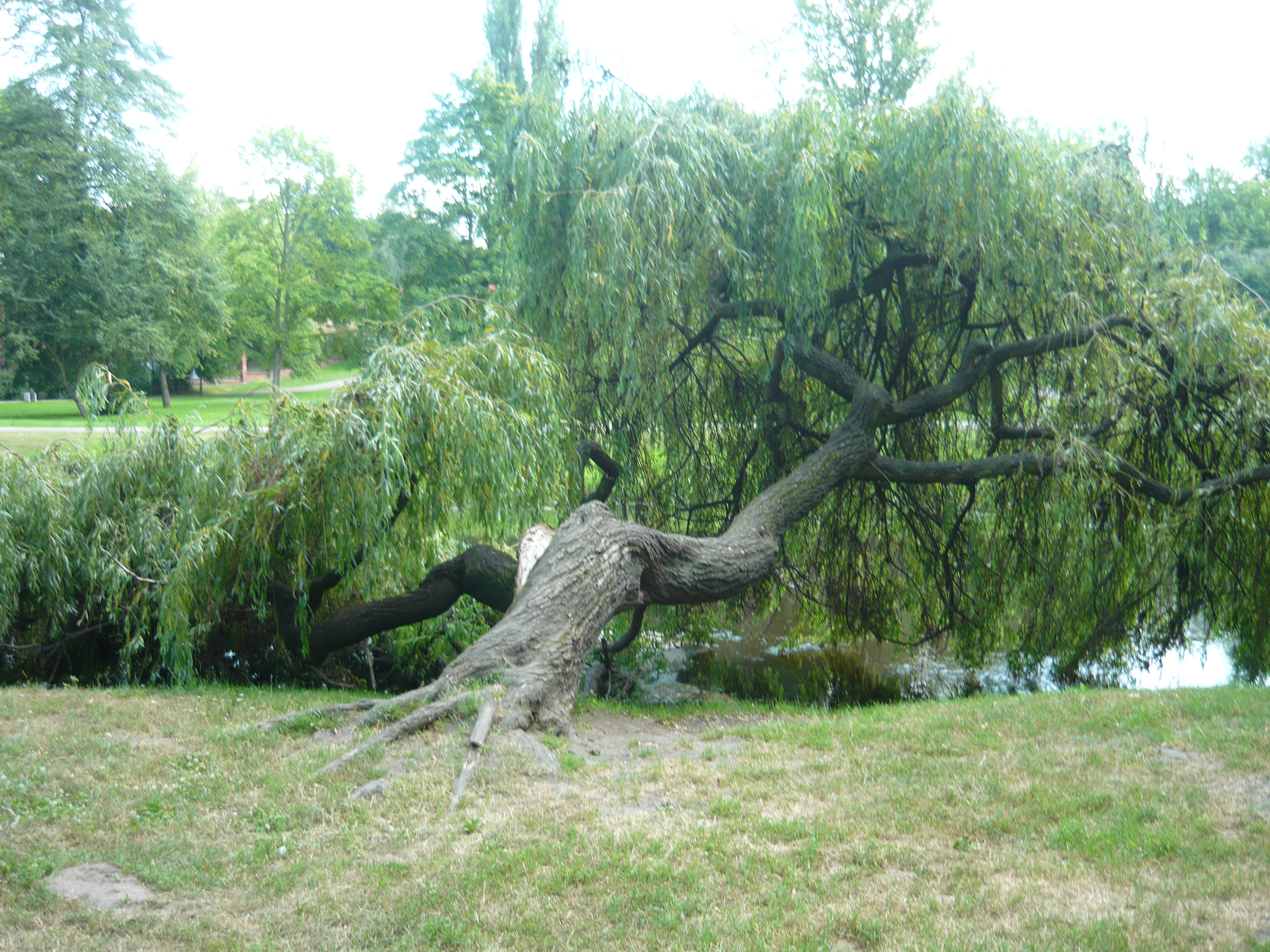
An unusual weeping willow, with its trunk almost entirely on the river surface

One of the attractions of the park is a historic weeping willow, with its trunk nearly on the surface of the Zgłowiączka river. In November 2017, city authorities decided to cut down the tree. The decision was met with great outrage from local residents, who felt sentimental about the old tree, where, among others, newly-weds would take photos. The residents organized an event on their Facebook profile "Włocławek the way we remember it" (pol. Włocławek, jaki pamietamy"), aimed at discouraging the authorities from cutting down the tree. The local station CW24, portal "DDWłocławek" and TVP3 Bydgoszcz reported on the case. Eventually, the decision to cut down the tree was abandoned, instead it was decided to take greater care of the willow.

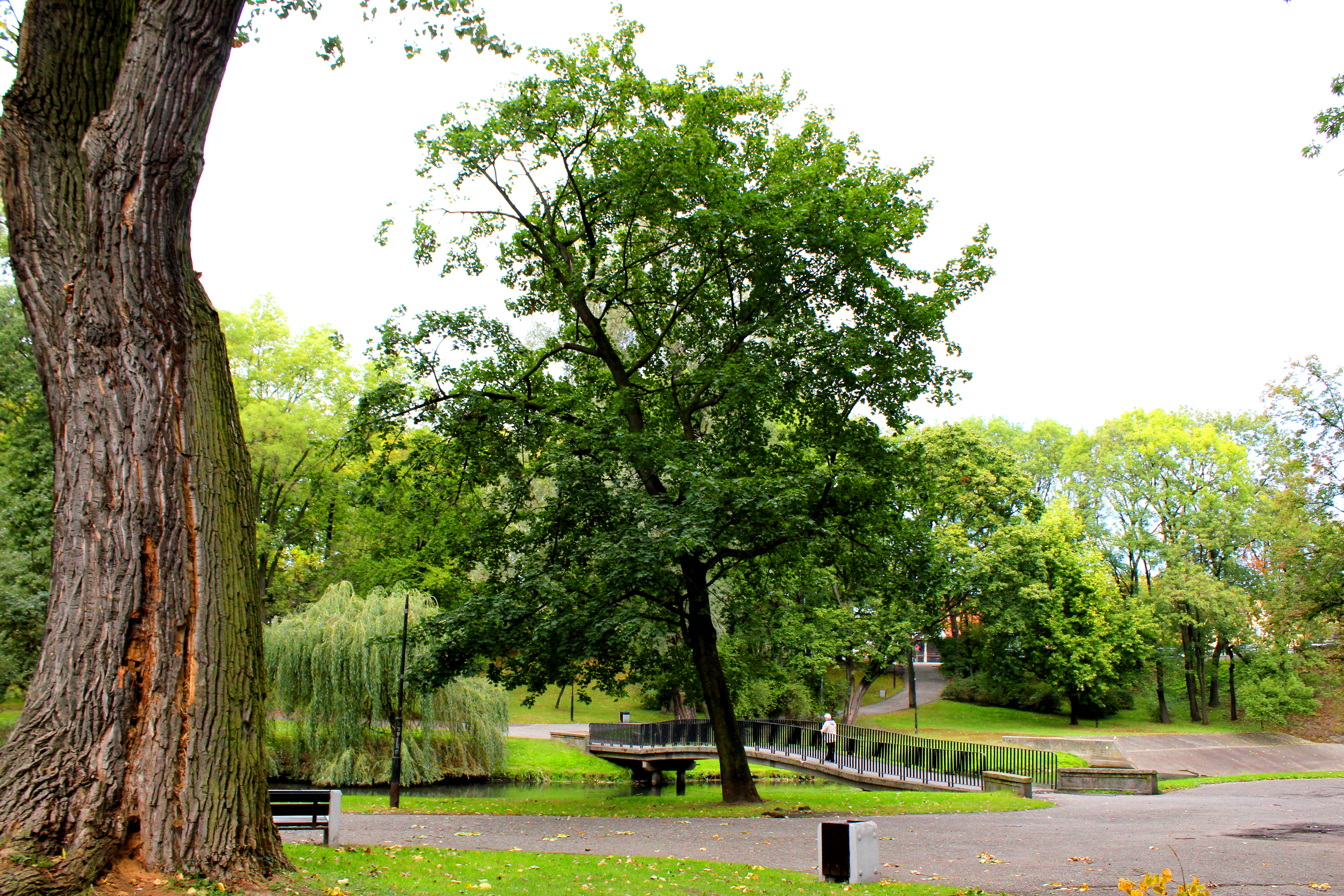
View of an avenue in the park and the bridge over the Zgłowiączka river, which flows through the park

Due to its location, the park is exposed to floods when Vistula takes over. This happened in 1937 and 2010.
