= Marshal Józef Piłsudski Boulevards =

Street in Włocławek, Poland

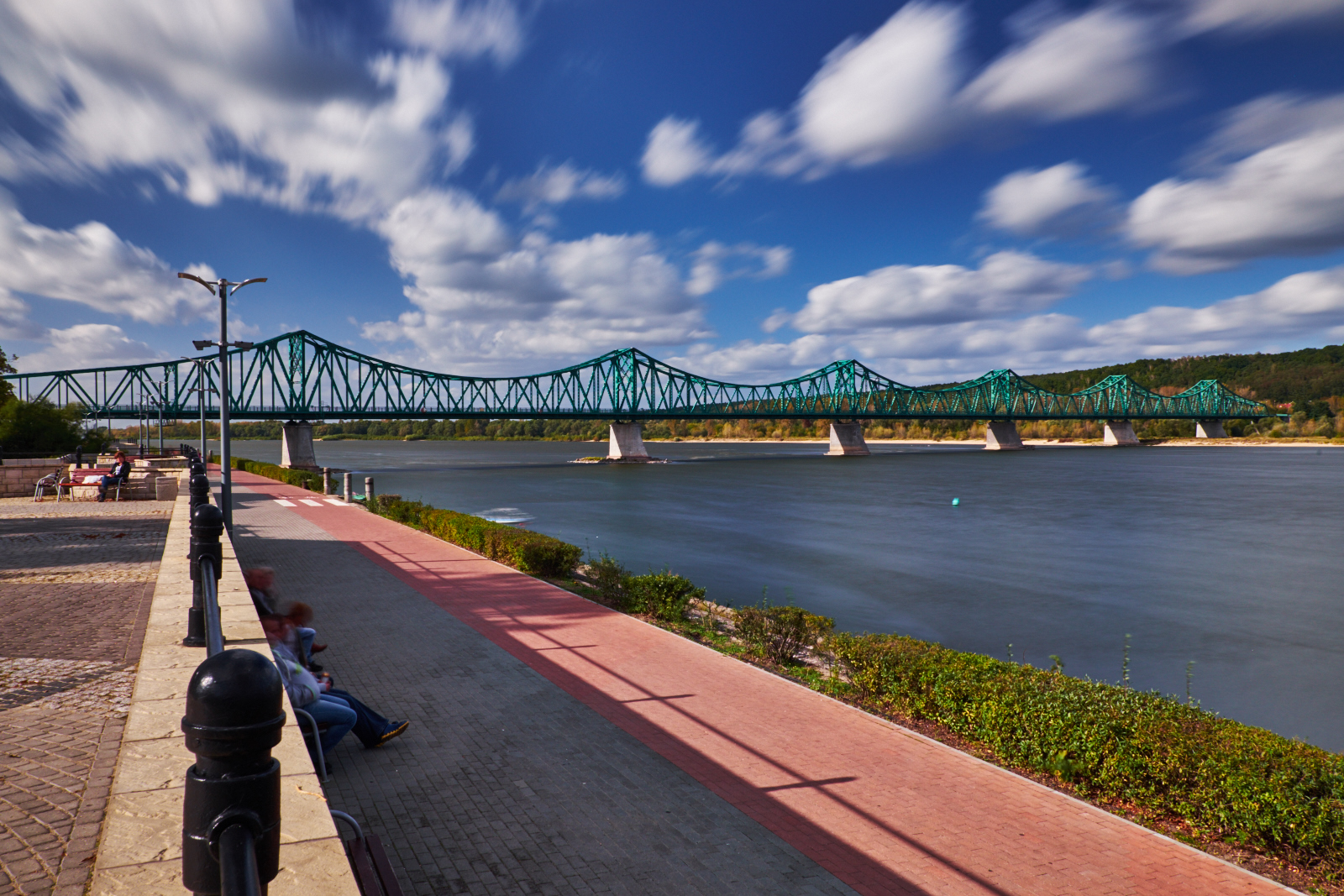
Marshal Józef Piłsudski Boulevards

The Marshal Józef Piłsudski Boulevards in Włocławek is a street located along the left bank of the Vistula River with an adjacent promenade crossing the Zgłowiączka river. It used to be called Nadbrzeżna St (19th century), Bulwarowa St (19th century-1945) and Boulevard of the Polish United Workers' Party (1945-1989). In the nineteenth century it was commonly called "Bulwarek" (instrumental case of the word „Bulwark”).

Regular events take place on the boulevards: Days of Włocławek, the Vistula River Festival, Boulevards of Sport and Art (in summer), as well as other concerts and events.

Among other things, you will find a children's playground and an outdoor gym, walking and cycling trails, as well as a car park with 30 spaces. There are 27 bicycle racks along the entire promenade. There are 13 viewing terraces with new trees and bushes planted. At one of them, opposite the Church of St. John the Baptist, there is the town's coat of arms laid out of cobblestone, as well as distances to the most important Polish and world cities and other patterns, such as fish (symbol of Christianity). A seasonal stall selling coffee and ice cream operates here as well. There is a Floating Stage on the Vistula River attached to the promenade - chairs for spectators are erected opposite to it.

The Boulevard is located on the Vistula Bicycle Route.

== History ==
=== Russian partition, 1840-1914 ===
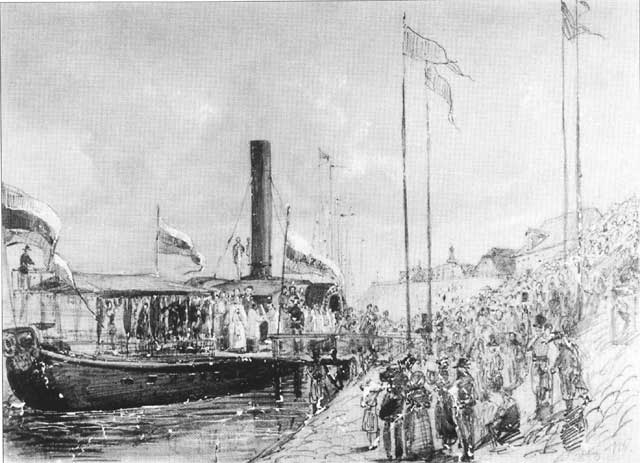
Baptism of the ship "Włocławek" illustrated by Wojciech Gerson

The street was outlined in 1840. It was then called Nadbrzeżna Street. It stretched from Gdańska Street to today's non-existent Końcowa Street, located near present-day Bechiego Street. Initially, it was an undeveloped and sandy road, often flooded by the Vistula.

In the years 1844-1846 the street was developed and paved. Mainly granaries and fishing houses were built at that time. Access to the port coast was facilitated and wooden railings were installed to separate the street from the river. These railings were used for hanging leather after cattle slaughter in a slaughterhouse located at the nearby Towarowa Street in order to dry it. In winter, when the Vistula was frozen, fresh blood attracted wolves living in the forests of Szpetal. During that time the street was considered to be very dangerous. Blood and waste from the slaughterhouse were flowing down the sewers under the slaughterhouse, from where they were pouring down to the Vistula along with rain. Stray dogs would feed on the waste.

In 1853 a steamboat called Włocławek was christened on the Boulevard.

People suspected of taking part in the January Uprising were held in a granary at the corner of the Boulevard and Browarna Street. The granary at the corner of Rybacka Street, on the other hand, was used to hold and persecute participants of the first conscription after the Uprising in 1865.

A bridge built in 1865 connected Włocławek's Downtown with the then town of Szpetal Dolny (today's Zawiśle). It also brought life around Bulwarowa Street, which became a place for strolls for Włocławek residents, many people also took up fishing. Numerous boats and floating rafts moored along the Boulevard. The existence of a permanent crossing on the Vistula added strategic importance to the street.

In the 19th century wooden railings were exchanged for metal ones. Among the contractors of the railings was the Włocławek Technical Equipment Factory "Wisła".

In the second half of the 19th century, on Bulwarowa Street, in a house belonging to Ciechowicz, Izabela Zbiegniewska lived and gave tutoring.

In 1910 under the address of Bulwary 19. the "Krater" Society registered its activity. It had its own shipyard where 3 ships were built: "Wilanów", "Kolos" and "Hetman".

=== World War I, 1914-1918 ===
During the German occupation of the city during World War I, the street was home to the German Warship Fleet Command (led by Captain Lerche) and the Construction Division (led by Captain Hoebel).

In 1914 retreating Russian forces set fire to the bridge. In 1915, the new German administration rebuilt it.

In November 1918 a skirmish took place here between the German army and a freshly formulated division of the Polish Legions in Włocławek. The barges with military equipment docked in the port were particularly defended. Two legionnaires died in this skirmish, but the Germans left the town.

=== The Polish-Soviet War and the Interwar Period, 1918-1939 ===
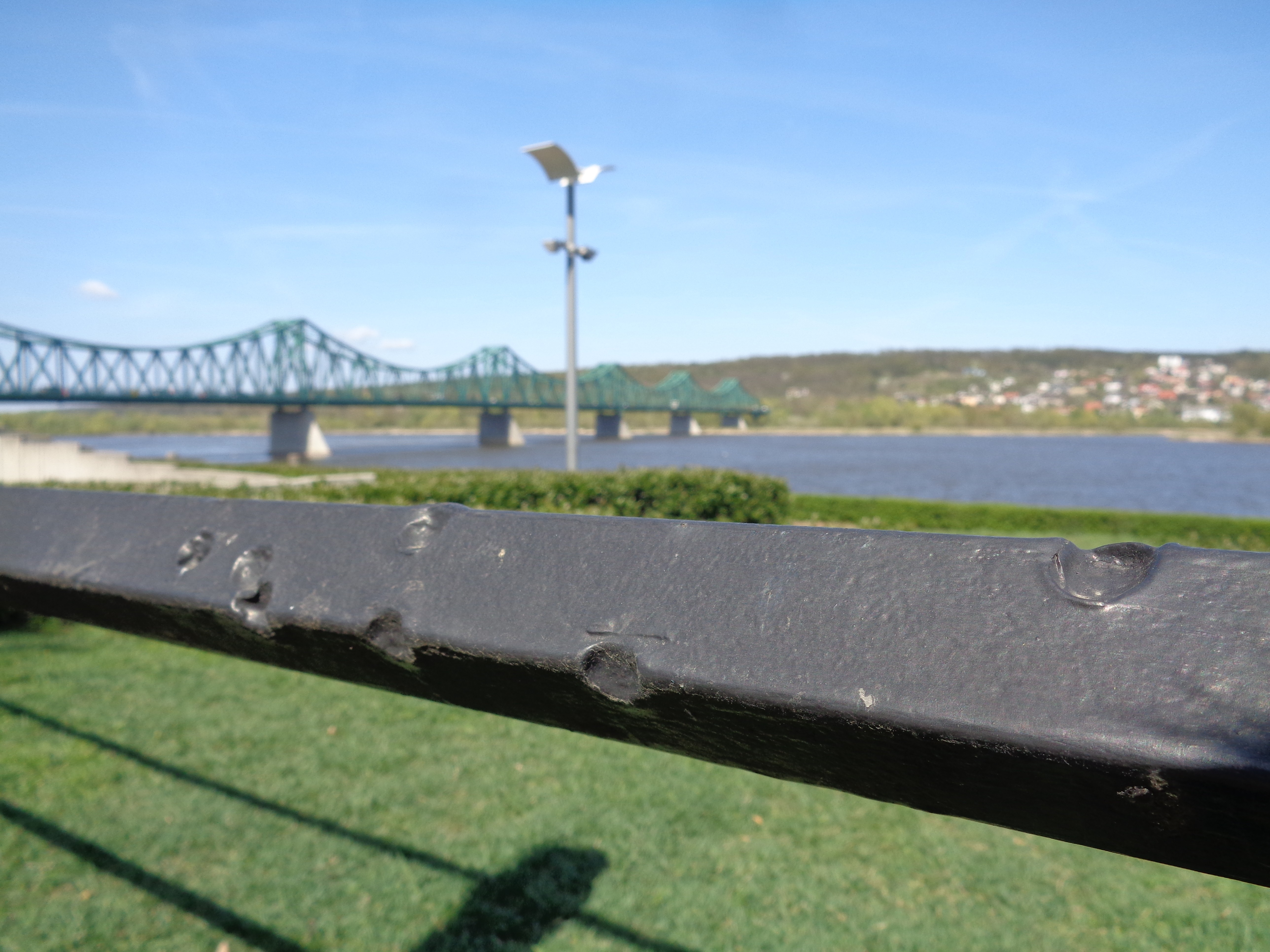
Traces of the 1920 Battle bullets in the Boulevard fence

In 1920, during the Polish-Bolshevik war, the bridge was burnt down by the Polish Army in order to obstruct the Bolsheviks' crossing of the Vistula.

In August 1920 a battle took place between the defending Polish forces occupying the left bank of the Vistula and the advancing Bolshevik forces occupying the right bank. Trenches were built on Bulwarowa Street, from which Polish soldiers exchanged fire with the Soviets while nurses provided them with medical assistance. Priests also worked at the trenches bringing the last sacrament to the wounded with volunteers distributing food to the soldiers. Nearly 40 people died during the battle. Residential houses on Bulwarowa Street and the Bishop's Palace were destroyed. St. John's Church was also damaged. Traces of bullets fired during this battle can still be found in the fence of the boulevard.

The bridge was rebuilt in 1922. It was finally dismantled in 1938, after a new steel bridge was completed.

In 1930, a monument to Marshal Józef Piłsudski was erected, in the centre of a specially built square. The construction of the monument was a manifestation of the cult of Józef Piłsudski. The monument was demolished by the Nazis in 1940, while the square remains to this day.

In 1937 a new bridge named after Edward Śmigły-Rydz was officially opened. The ribbon was cut by the bridge's patron himself.

During the interwar period the Boulevards were a traditional place to celebrate the anniversary of the Battle of 1920. Delegations of associations, the army, the clergy and the inhabitants of the town gathered here. Since 1922 a march from the then Saxon Square (today's Freedom Square) to the Boulevard was organized. The army was reviewed and the anthem was sung here. These celebrations were not organized on August 15 as it is today, but rather on different days between August 12 and 27.

In the era of the People's Republic of Poland the holiday was not celebrated, and since 1989 the main celebrations of the Miracle on the Vistula take place at the Monument to the Fallen Defenders of the Vistula.

=== The People's Republic of Poland, 1945-1989 ===
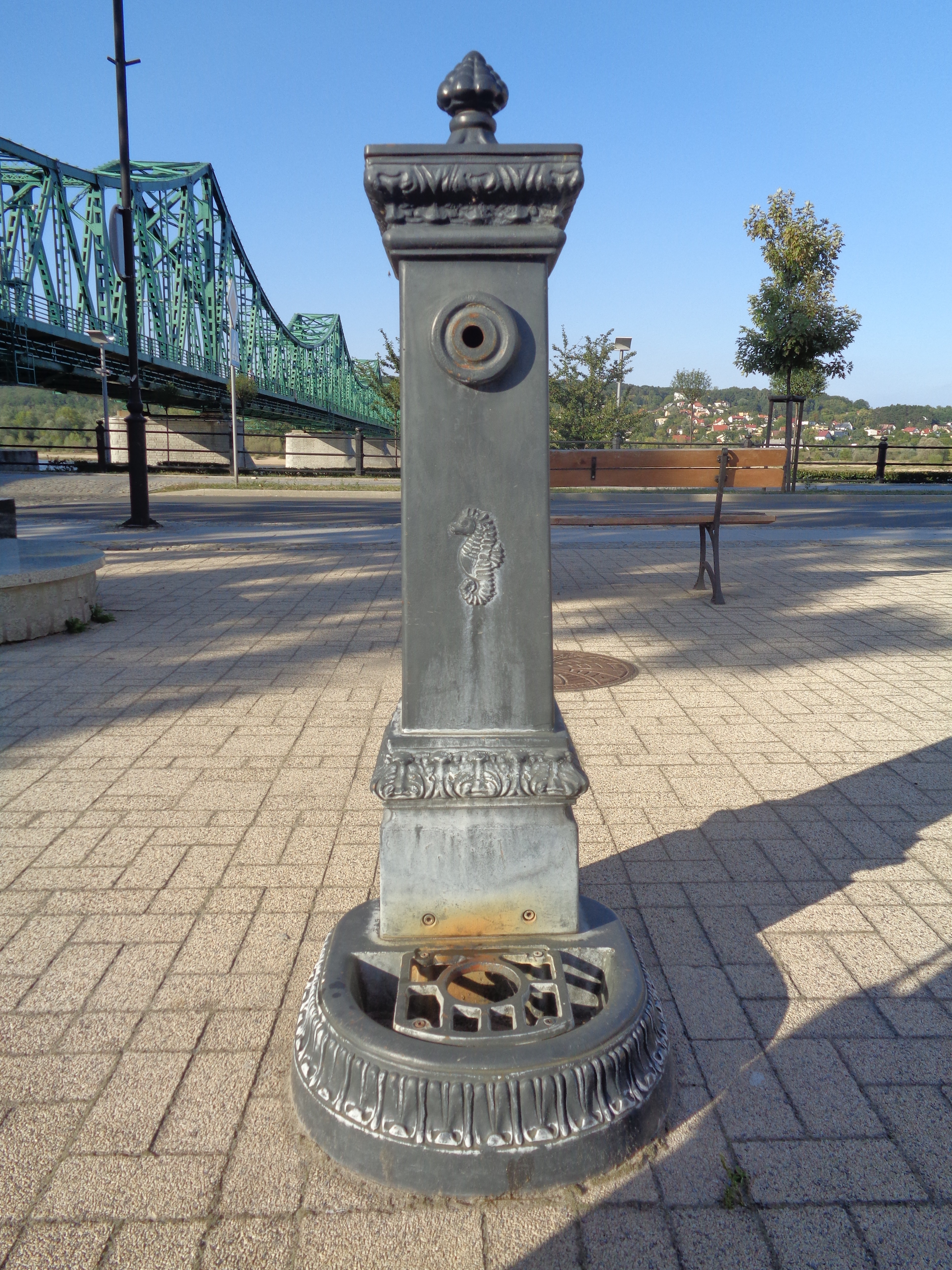
Decorative street hydrant at Piłsudski Boulevards in Włocławek

During the communist period of the People's Republic of Poland, the street took the Polish United Workers' Party as its patron. On 14 December 1978, in the square at the site of the former Piłsudski's monument, the Working People's Monument was ceremonially unveiled. Beginning in 1979, the monument became the starting point for the First May parades in Włocławek. In 1989, as part of the decommunization process, the monument was set to be demolished, which ultimately did not happen.

The port of Włocławek was liquidated in the 1980s, which led to a decrease in traffic along the street.

=== The Third Republic, since 1989 ===
The promenade was flooded in May 2010.

In the years 2010-2011, the boulevards were thoroughly modernised. New paths and pavements were created along with benches. An outdoor gym, a playground for children, a car park and viewing terraces were built. In 2013, the Floating Stage on the Vistula River was constructed along with chairs for the audience.

In 2013, the two banks of the Zgłowiączka River were connected by a footbridge, and in the following year, the Jerzy Bojańczyk Water Harbour was opened.

== Buildings ==
=== Present-day buildings ===
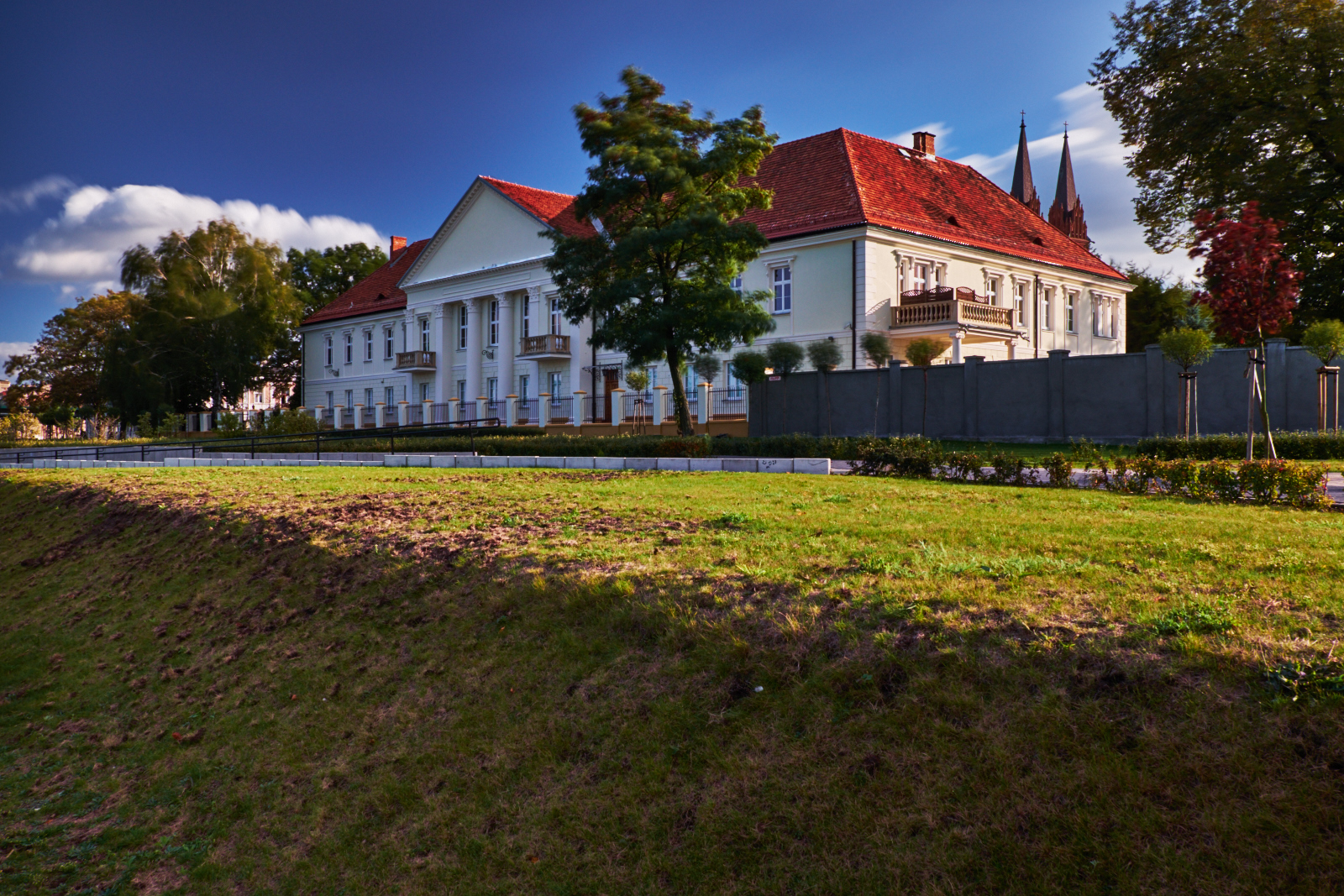
Bishop's Palace seen from the promenade

There are many historic tenement houses along the Marshal Józef Piłsudski Boulevard, as well as other buildings important for the history and culture of the city. These are (in order from the lowest to the highest police number):

- Maria Skłodowska-Curie Chemical School Complex, 4 Bulwary Street, on the corner with Ogniowa Street.
- The Complex of Technical Schools (building erected in 1924), registered at Ogniowa Street, a football field adjacent to Bulwary Street.
- Maria Konopnicka High School No. III (the building erected in 1926-1930), registered at 1 Bechi Street, adjacent to Bulwary Street.
- Former Feliks Steinhagen's Villa (built between 1923 and 1925), currently the seat of the representation of the Marshal's Office of the Kujawsko-Pomorskie Voivodeship with an information point for European subsidies, registered under the address of 2 Bechi St., adjacent to the square on Bulwary Street.
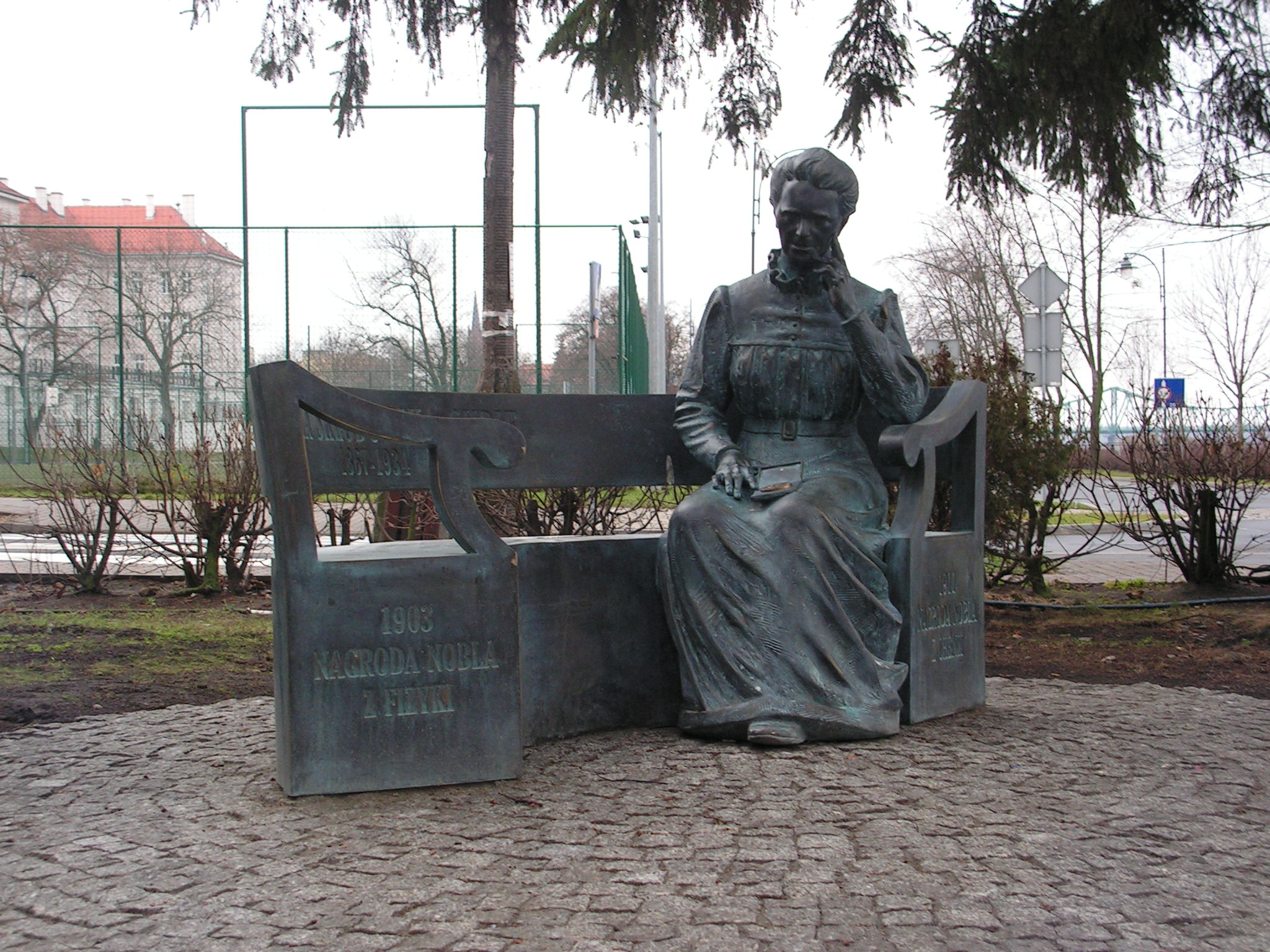
- Maria Skłodowska-Curie bench in front of the building of the Chemical School Complex, 2019.
  Monument to the Working People, unveiled in 1978, at the square on Bulwary Street.
- A historic house, currently the seat of the Voivodeship Labour Office in Toruń, branch in Włocławek, 5b Bulwary Street, built in 1950.
- Granary built in 1848, currently the seat of the Ethnographic Branch of the Kuyavian and Dobrzyn land Museum, 6 Bulwary Street, corner of Towarowa and Szpichlerna Streets.
- Granary built in 1842, currently the warehouse of the Kuyavian and Dobrzyn land Museum, 9 Bulwary Street, corner of 8 Szpichlerna Street and Rybacka Street.
- A historic residential building, built in 1910, registered at 2 Browarna Street on the corner of Bulwary Street.
- Historic residential building, built in 1937, 15 Bulwary Street.
- Historic residential building, built in 1938, 16 Bulwary Street.
- A historic residential building, built at the beginning of the 20th century, 17 Bulwary Street.
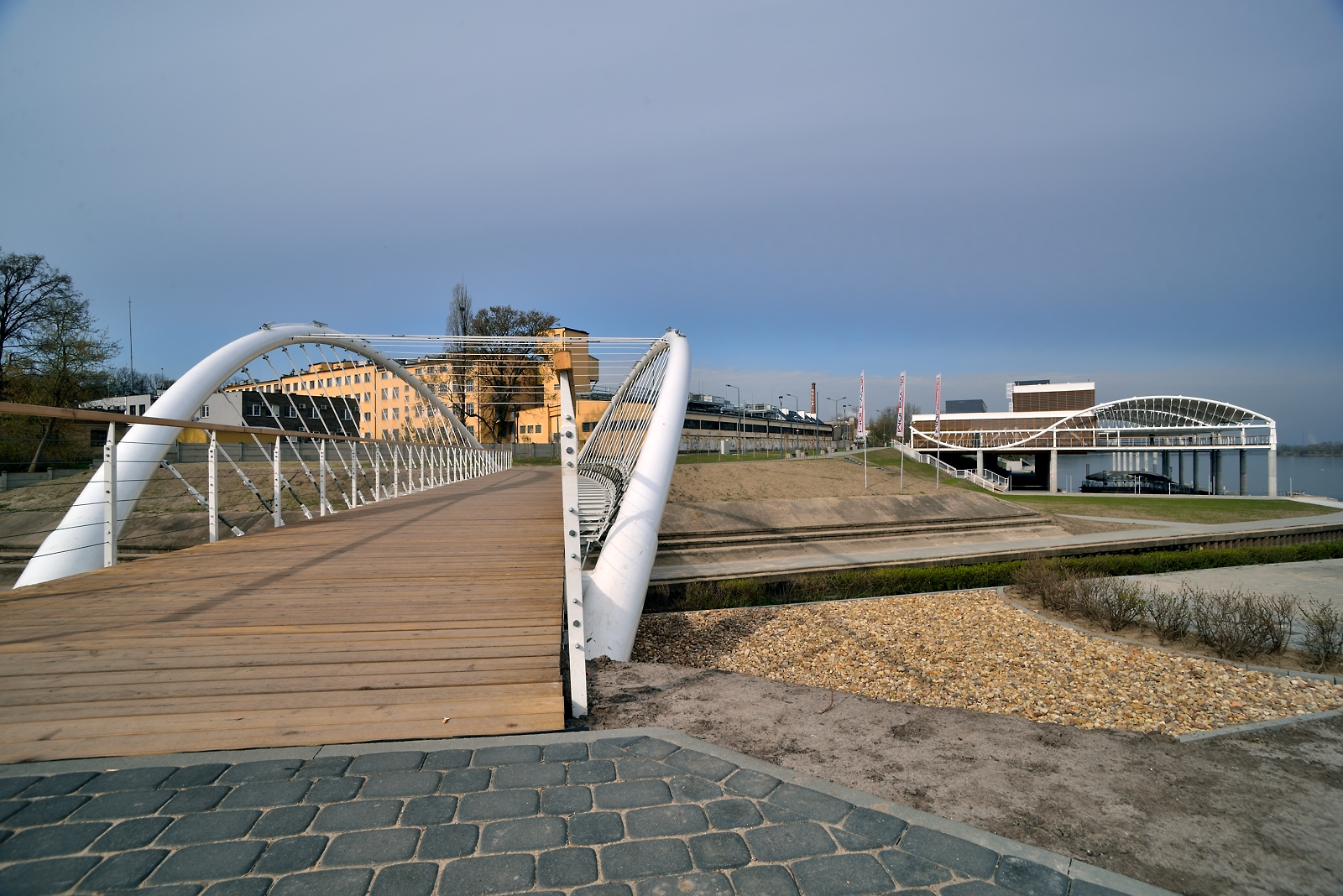
- The water marina at the mouth of Zgłowiączka to the Vistula River
  Former granary, now a residential house, built around 1900, 18 Bulwary St. (at the corner with St. John St. 1).
- Church of St. John the Baptist, built in the 16th century.
- A residential building, built in 1842, a monument planned to be entered into the register, 2 Maślana Street, adjacent to the Boulevard.
- A residential building, built in 1881, burnt in 1996 and rebuilt in 1998, a monument planned to be entered in the register, 22 Bulwary Street, on the corner with 1 Wiślana Street.
- A historic residential building, built in 1902, once the seat of the Club of Honorary Blood Donors of the Polish Red Cross and the Diabetic Children's Aid Club, 24 Bulwary St.
- A residential building, built in 1901, a monument planned to be entered in the register, 25 Bulwary St.
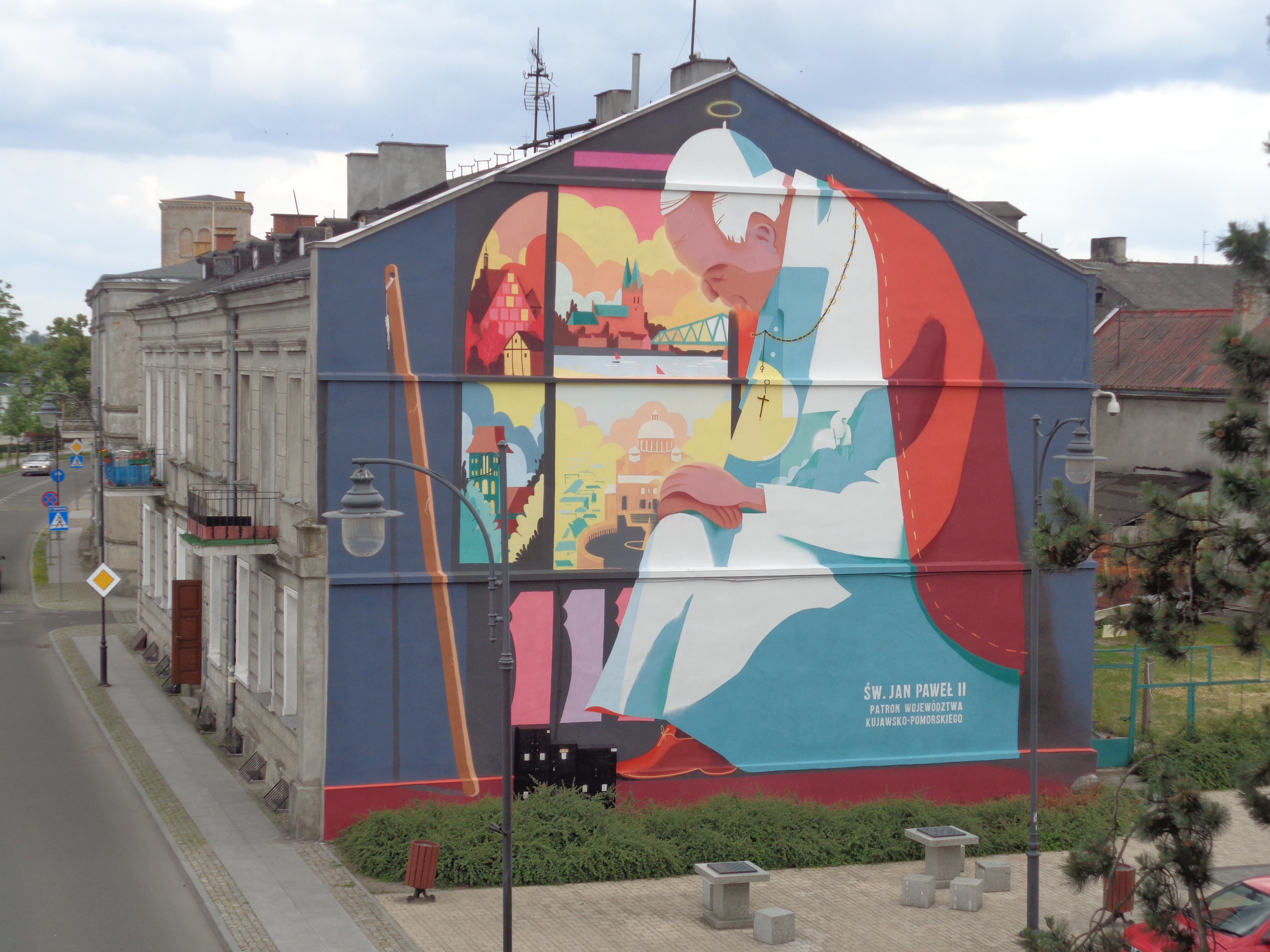
- A mural depicting John Paul II
  Dwelling building, built in 1910, a monument planned to be entered in the register, 27 Bulwary St.
- A historic residential building, built in 1902, 24 Bulwary St., on the corner with Gdańska St. 1.
- Bishop's Palace - a former castle, erected in the 14th century and rebuilt many times, located at the end of the street with the address on Gdańska Street.
- Jerzy Bojańczyk Water Marina, opened in 2014, located on Piwna Street, connected to the Boulevard by a footbridge built especially for this purpose.

The Edward Śmigły-Rydz Bridge passes over the street. In the vicinity of the bridge there are open-air chessboards and a monument commemorating the place where in the Middle Ages a border ran between Civitas Cathedralis (Cathedral City), an area belonging directly to the bishops of Kujawy, and Civitas theutonicalis, an area where merchants settled.

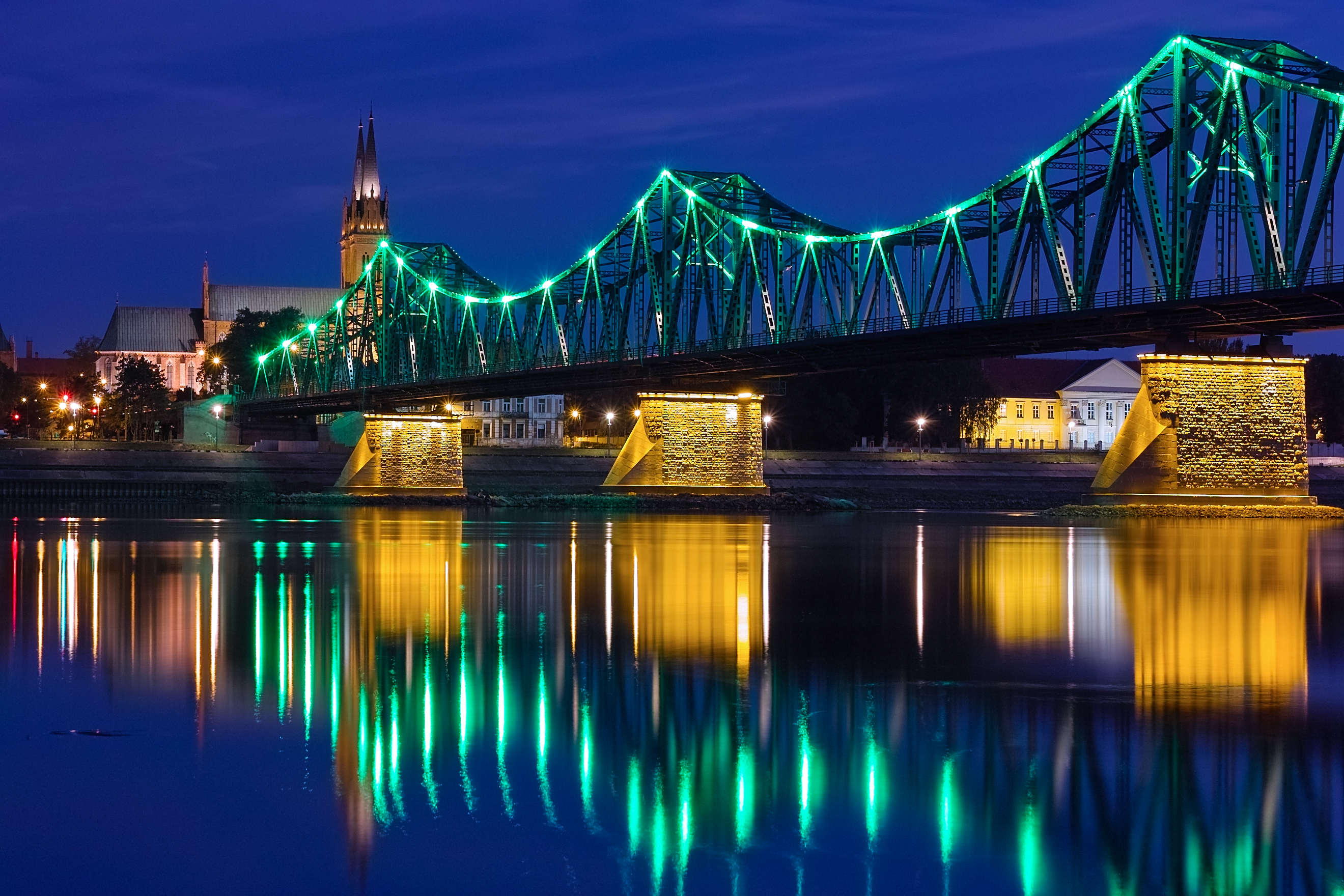
View of the Edward Śmigły-Rydz Bridge

=== Non-existent buildings ===
As late as in the 19th century, there were remains of the 13th-century St. Stanislaw's Cathedral by the Boulevard[3], which also had a cemetery. It was located in the area where today's buildings at 27 Bulwary Street (the corner with 2 Bednarska Street) and 28 Bulwary Street (to the corner with 1 Gdańska Street) stand. In 1902, during the construction of the present tenement house, a stone crypt, a remnant of the Church, as well as remains of the graves of the church cemetery, were discovered. More graves were discovered in the 1990s at the point where the tenement house is connecting to the building at 27 Bulwary Street at the corner of 2 Bednarska Street. In 2011, during the reconstruction of the building at 3 Gdańska Street, more graves from the former cemetery were discovered.

Fishermen's houses, also not preserved to this day, were situated next to granaries.

At the end of the nineteenth century, the first marina of the Włocławek Rowing Society was built on the Boulevard, which has not survived to this day.

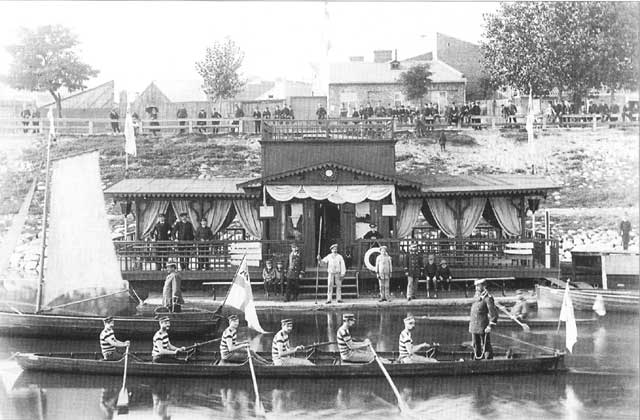
Unpreserved marina on the Vistula River on a photograph by Bolesław Sztejner

In 1930, a monument to Marshal Józef Piłsudski was unveiled at the square on Bulwary Street, later destroyed in 1940 during the Nazi occupation.

On the Vistula, at the height of Gdańska Street, one can still see the remains of the former bridge, which was demolished in 1938.

In 2017 two historic residential houses were demolished at 12 Bulwary Street (built in 1930) and 13 Bulwary Street at the corner of 1 Browarna Street (built in 1938).

== Gallery ==
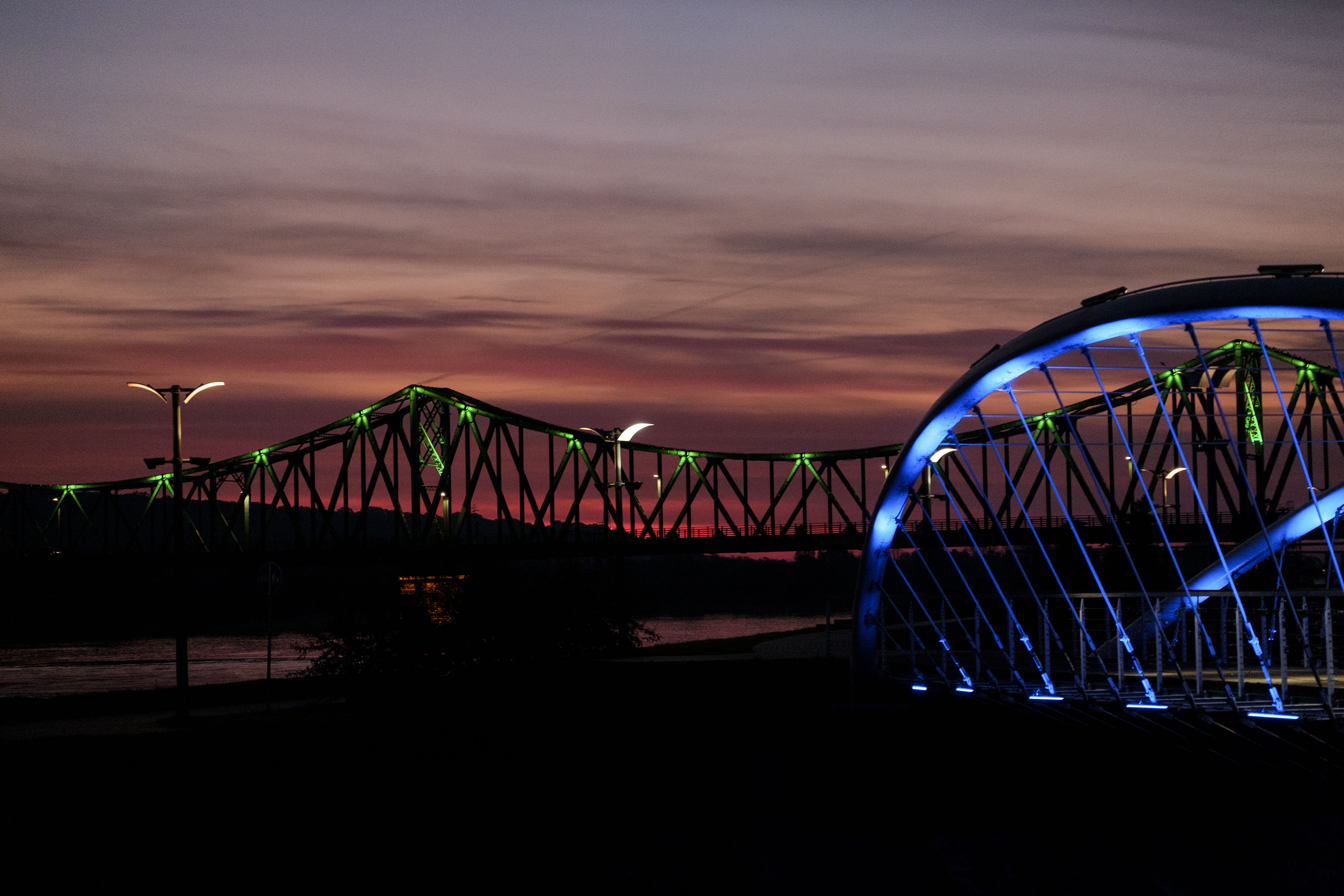
View of the E. Śmigły-Rydz Bridge and the footbridge over the Zgłowiączka river.

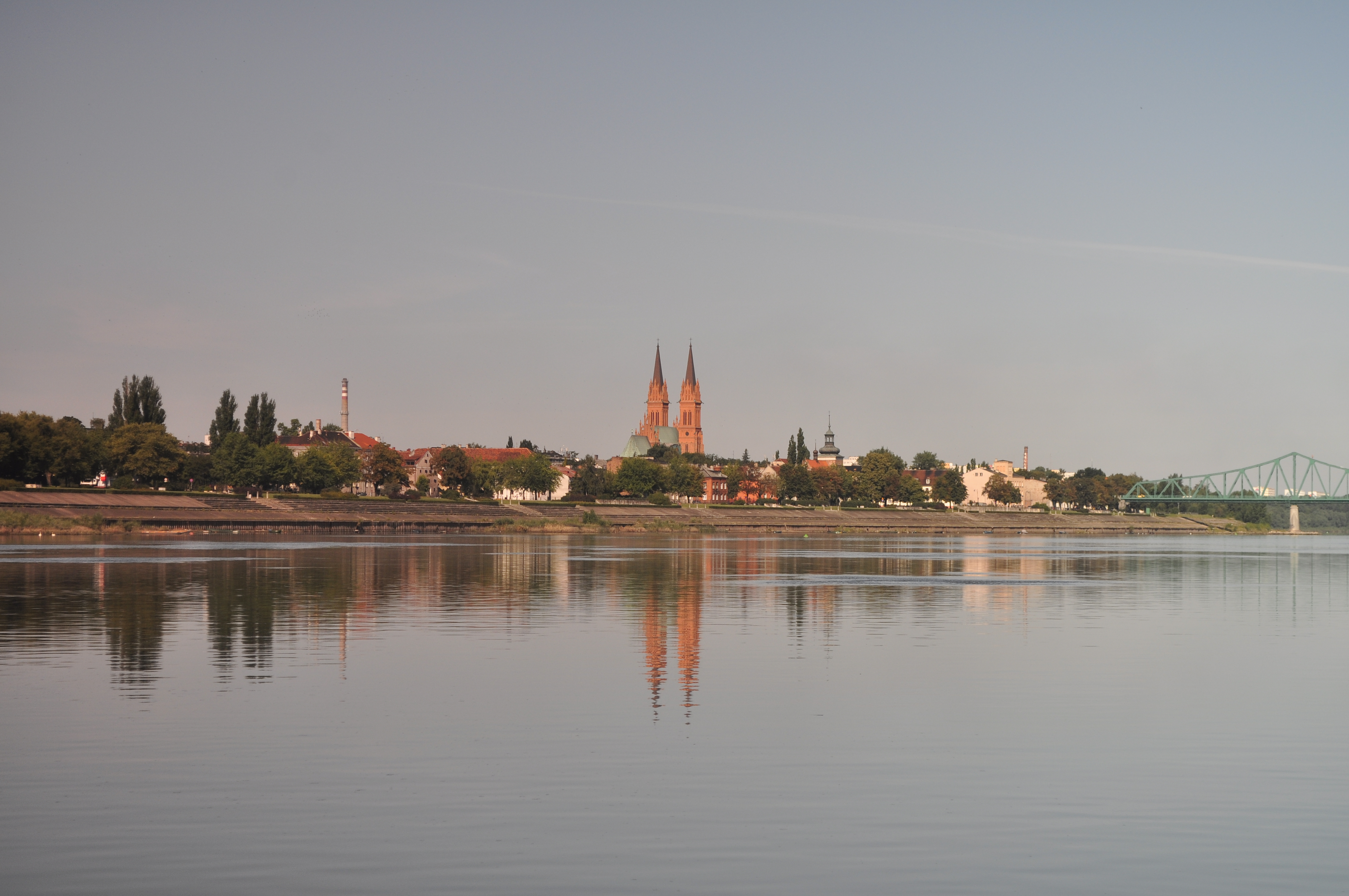
View from the other side of the Vistula

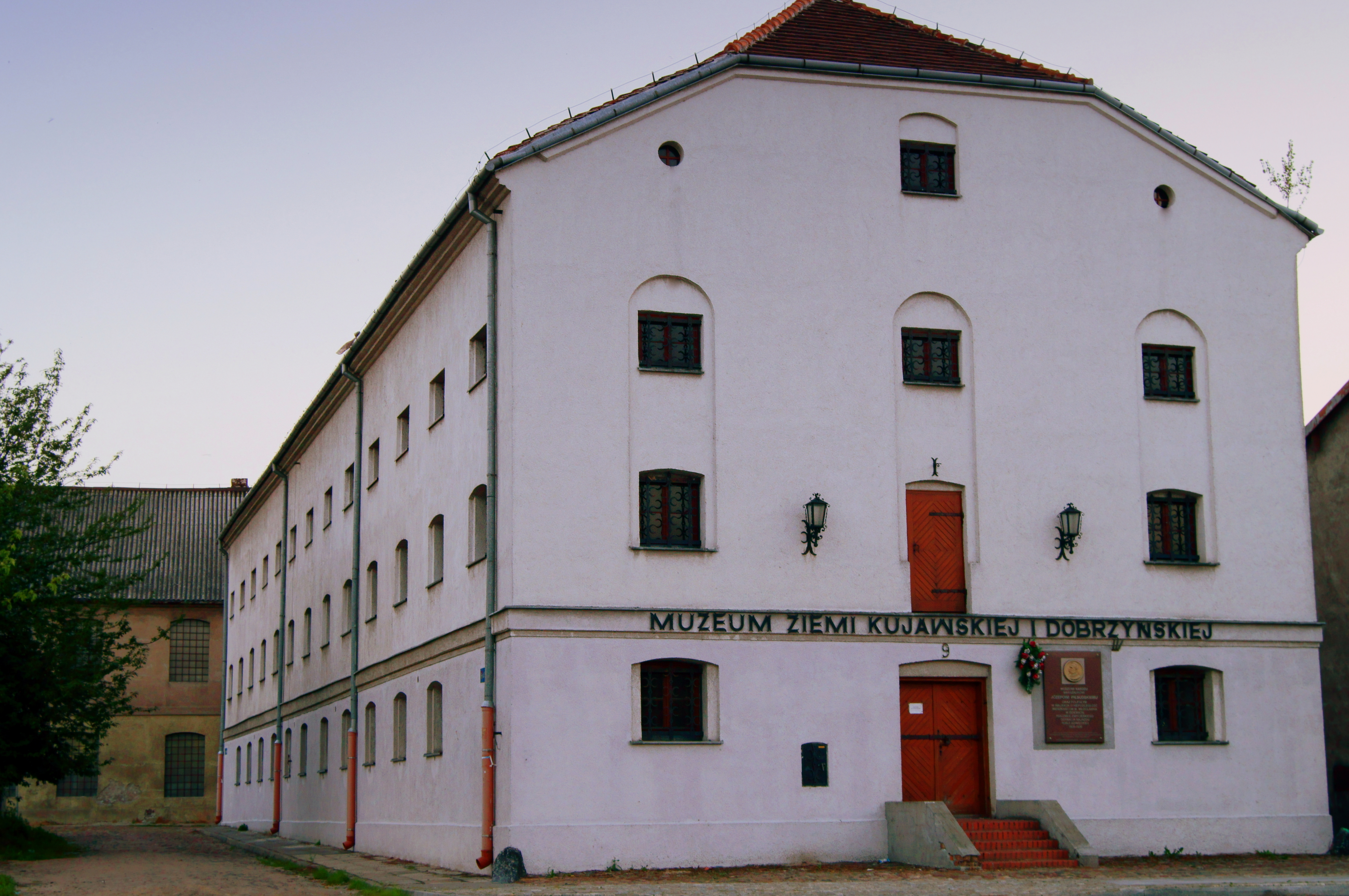
Granary built in 1842, currently a warehouse

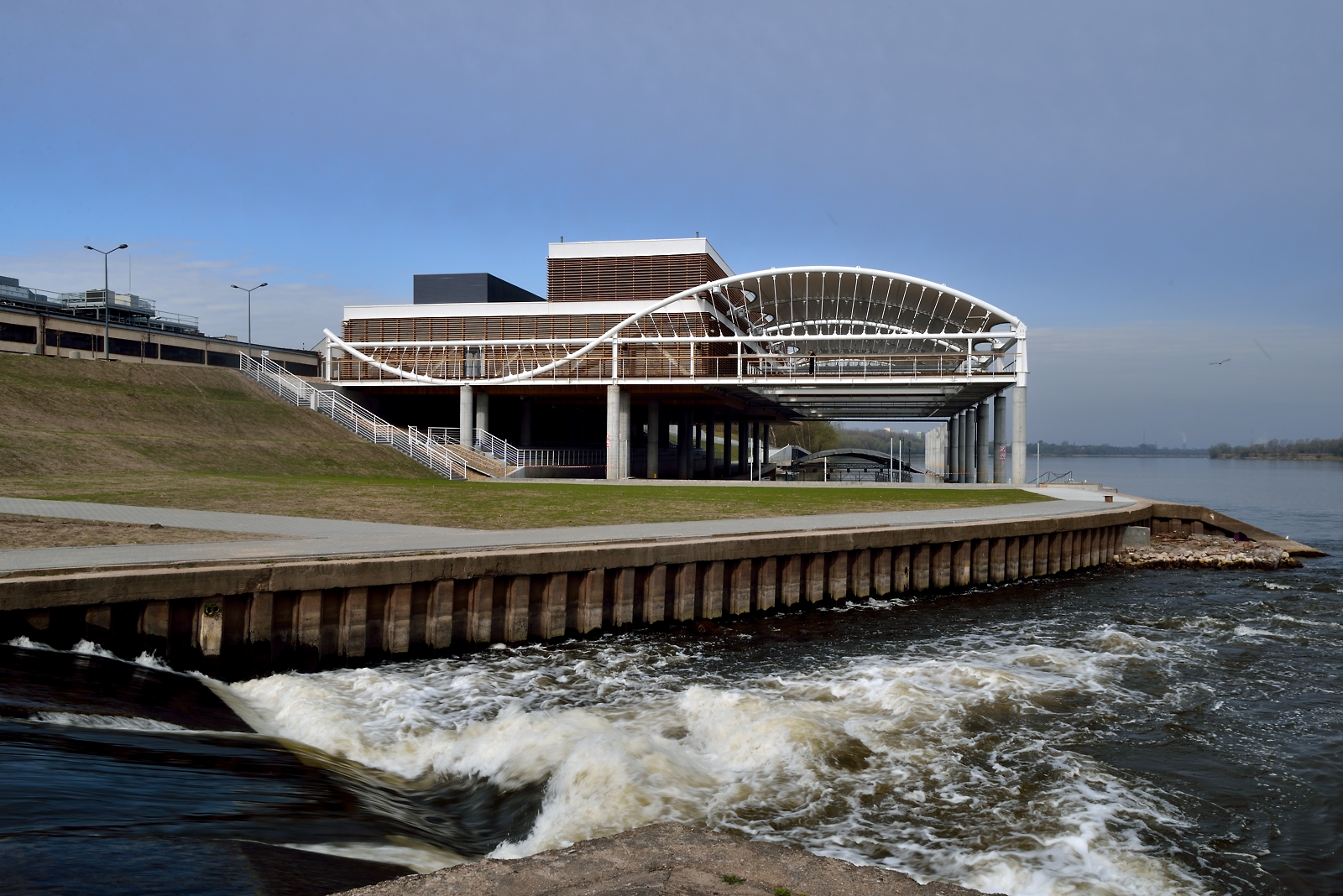
Jerzy Bojańczyk Water Marina

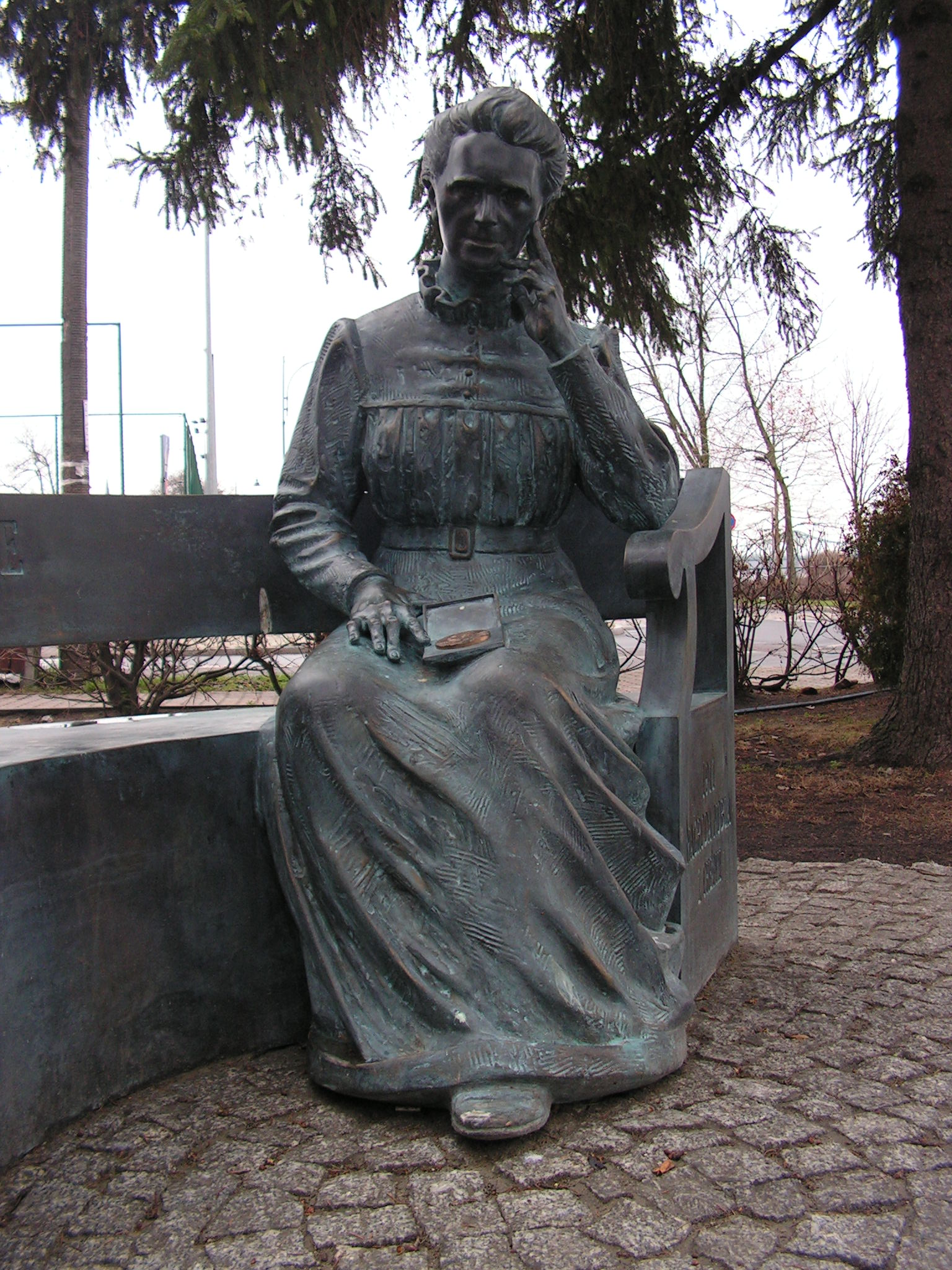
Maria Skłodowska-Curie bench in Włocławek

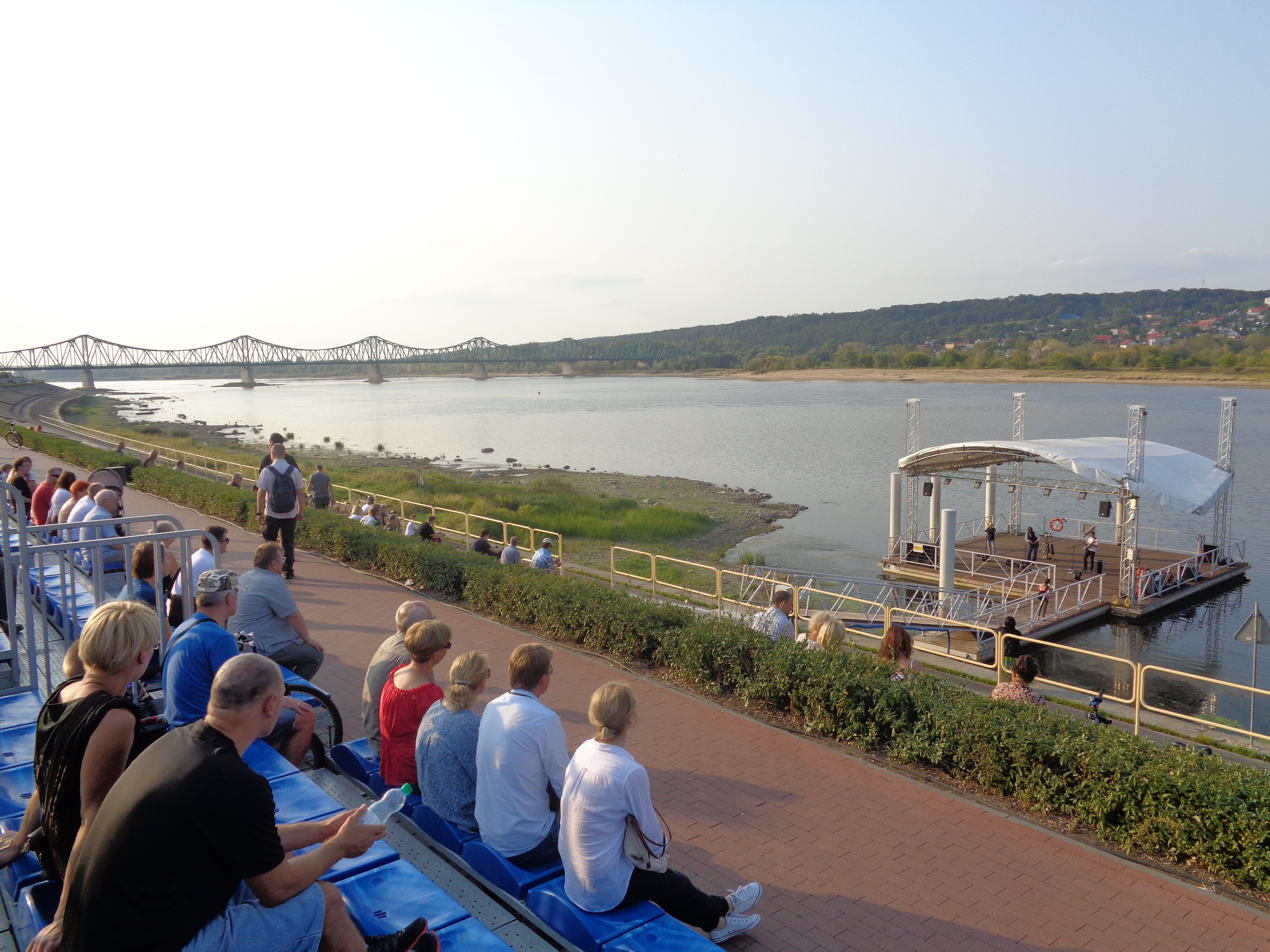
The audience utilizing the benches during the concert on the Floating Stage

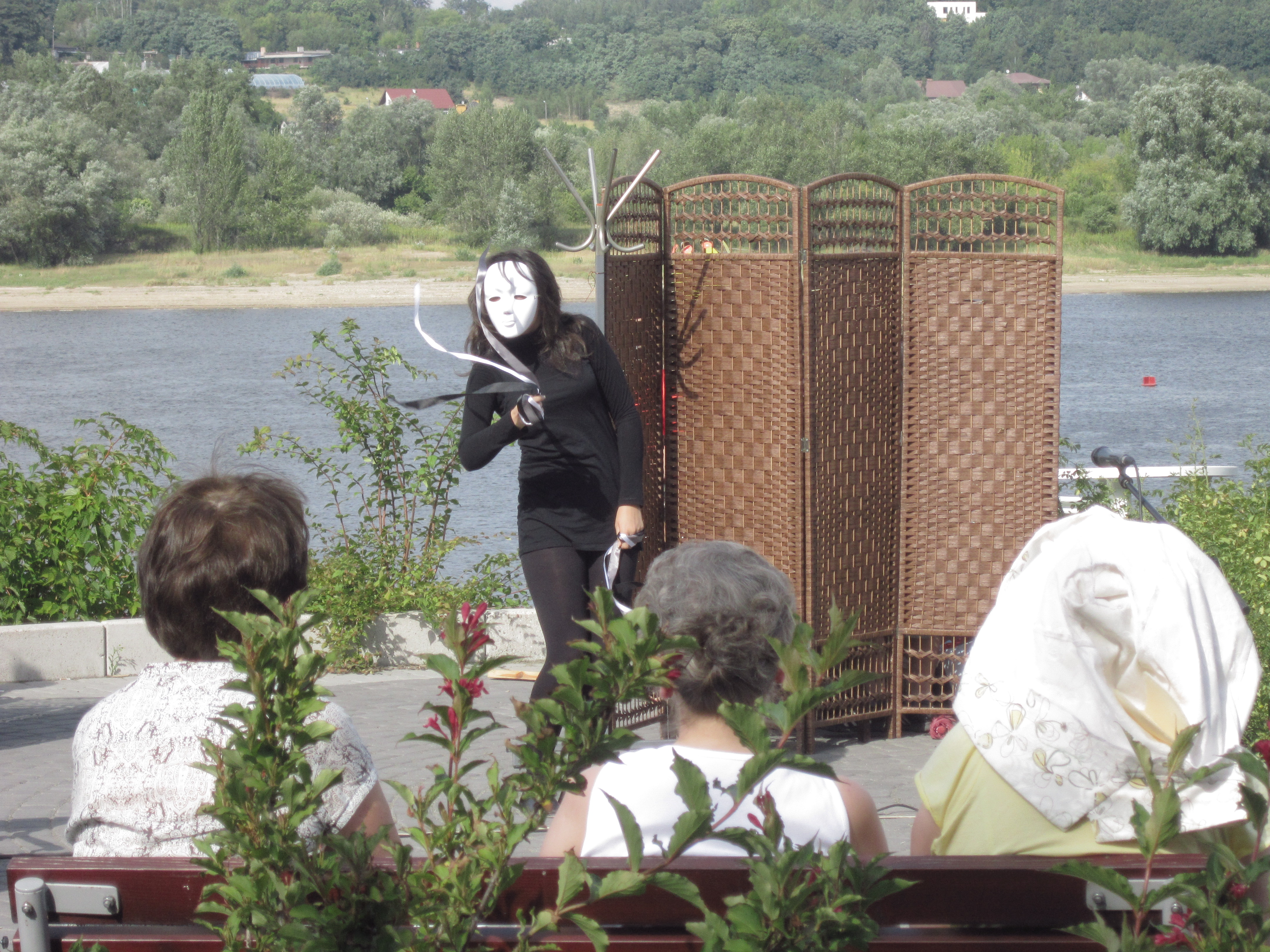
Performance during the "Boulevard of Art" event

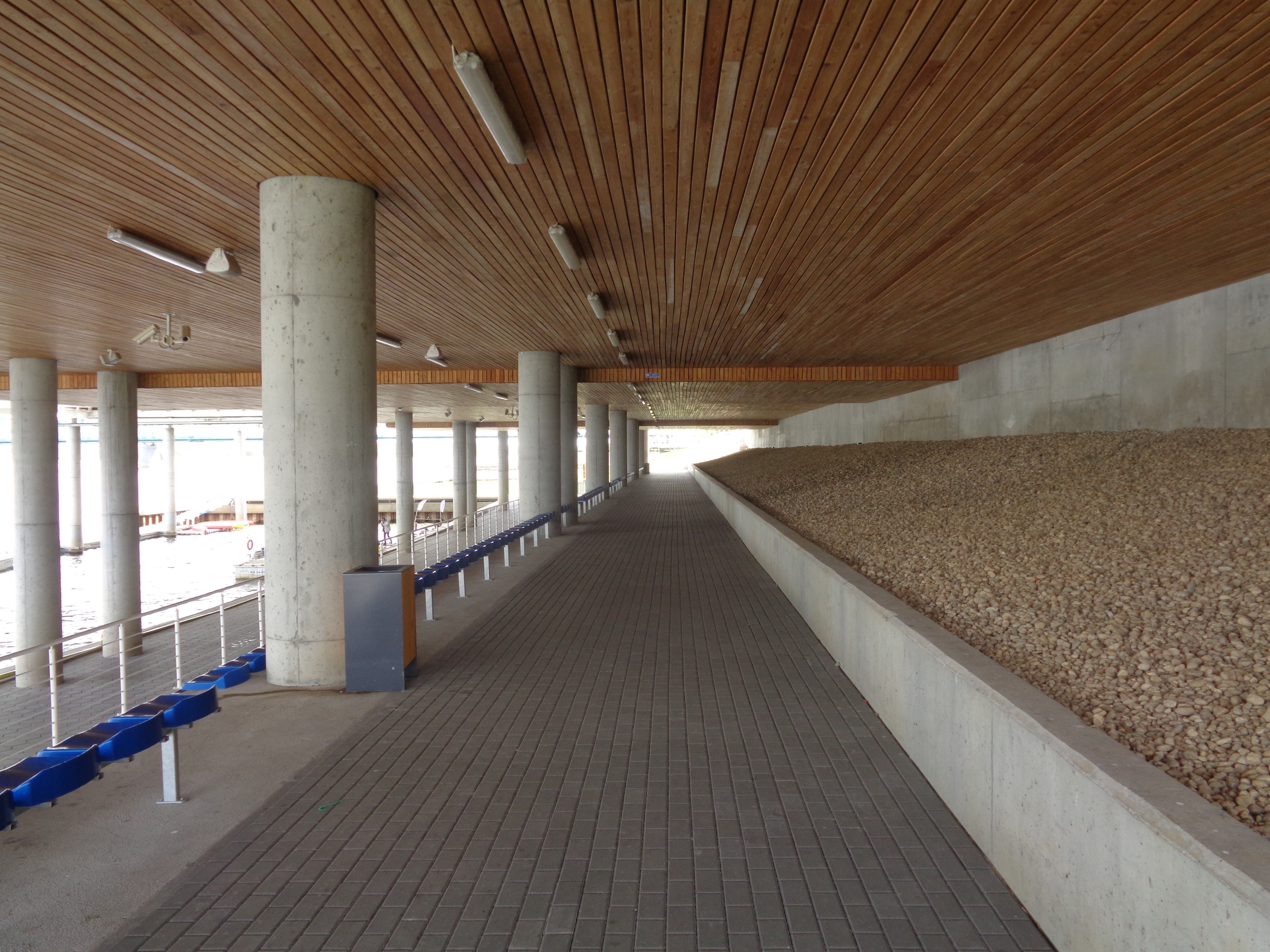
Water marina on the Vistula

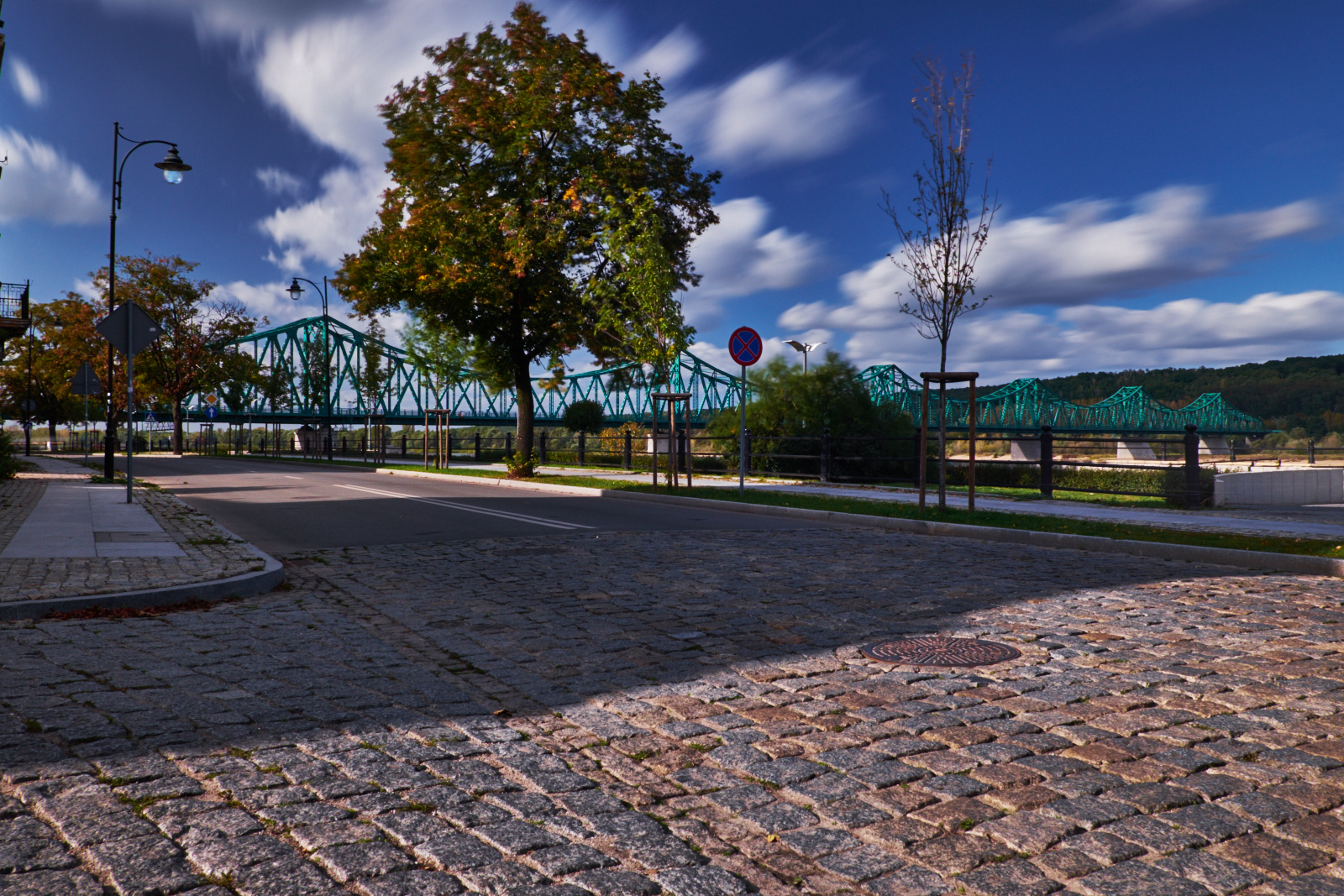
Marshal Józef Piłsudski Boulevards in Włocławek

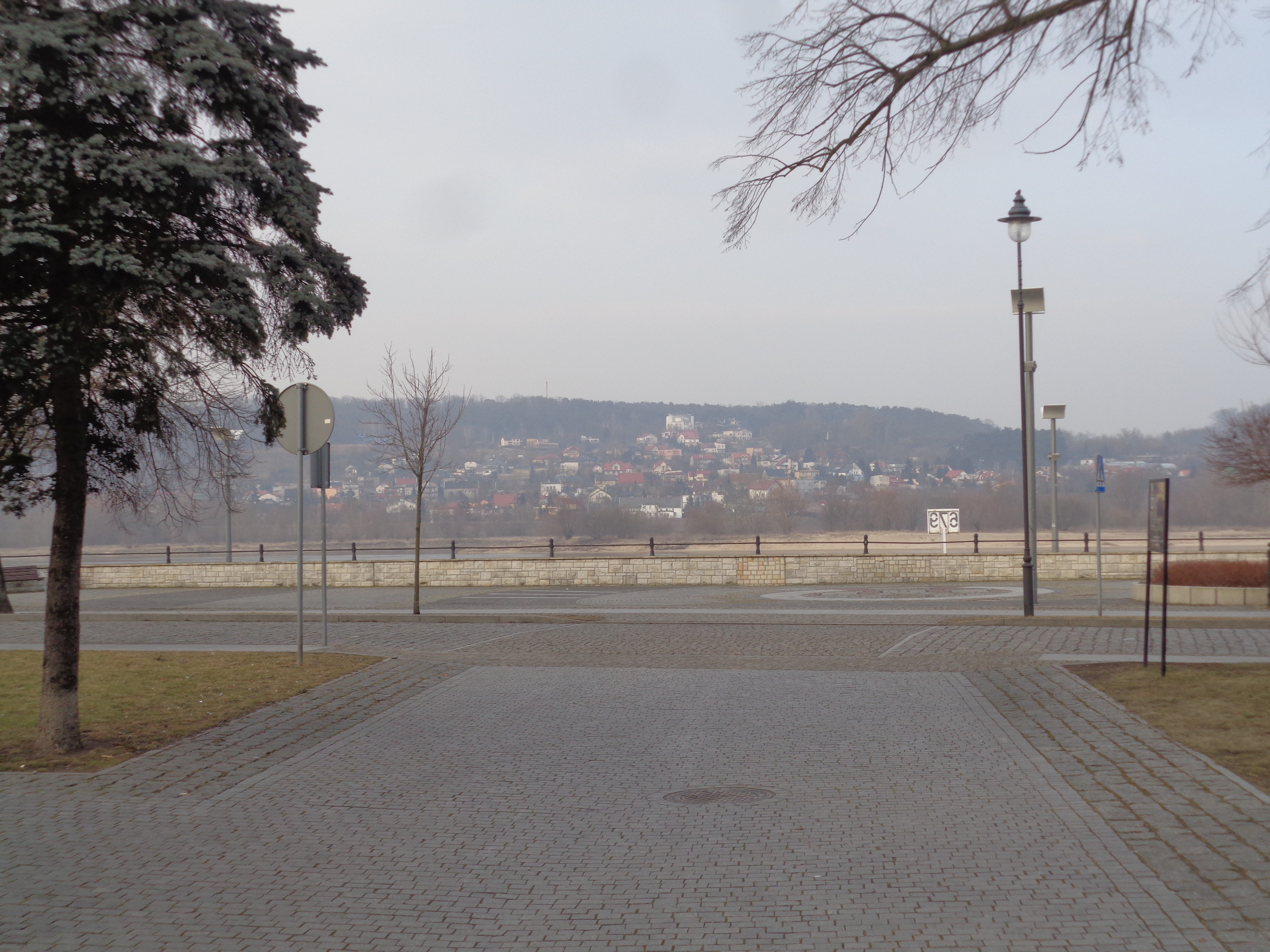
View of the Boulevard and Zawisle City District

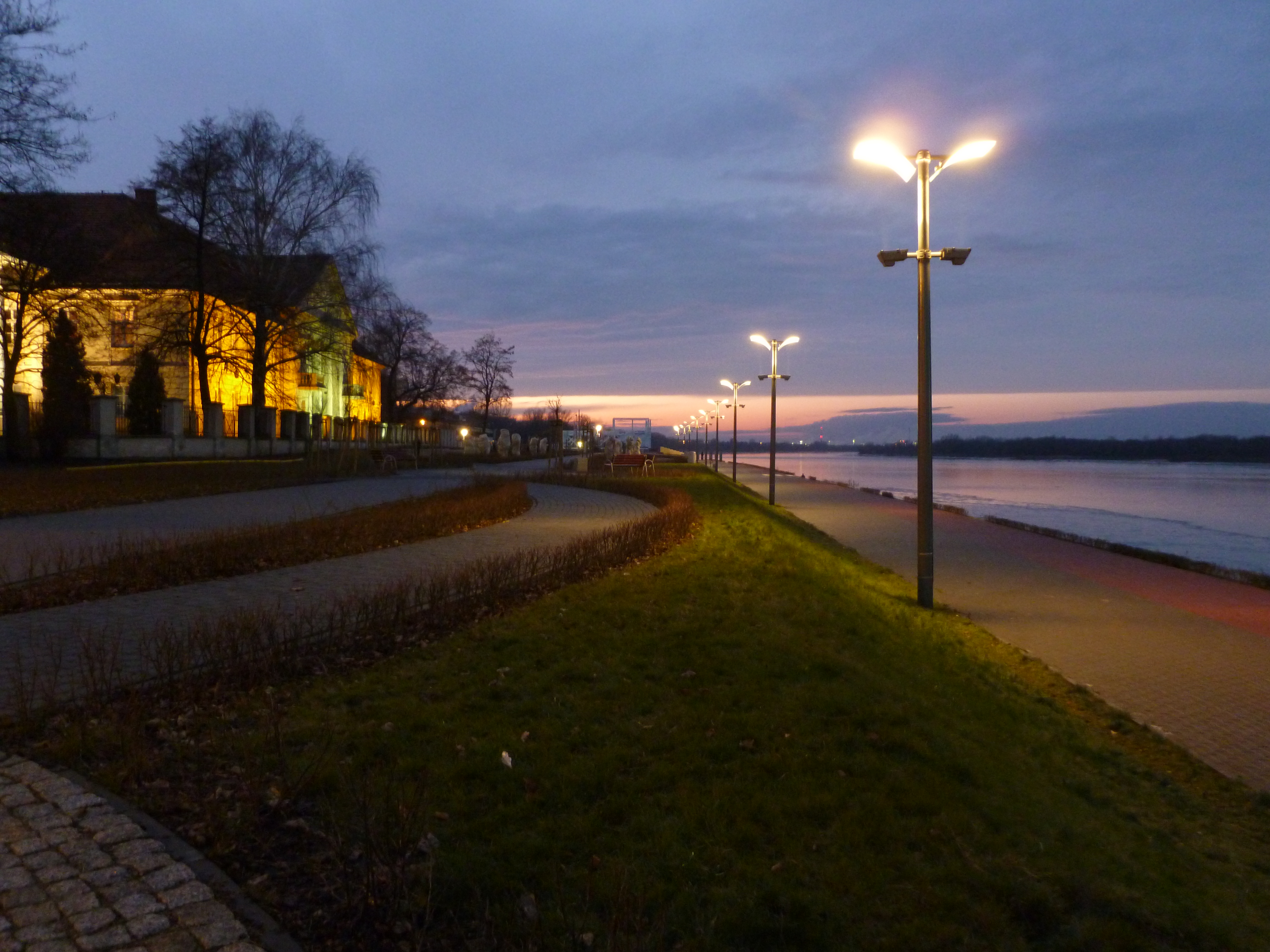
Marshal Józef Piłsudski Boulevards at night

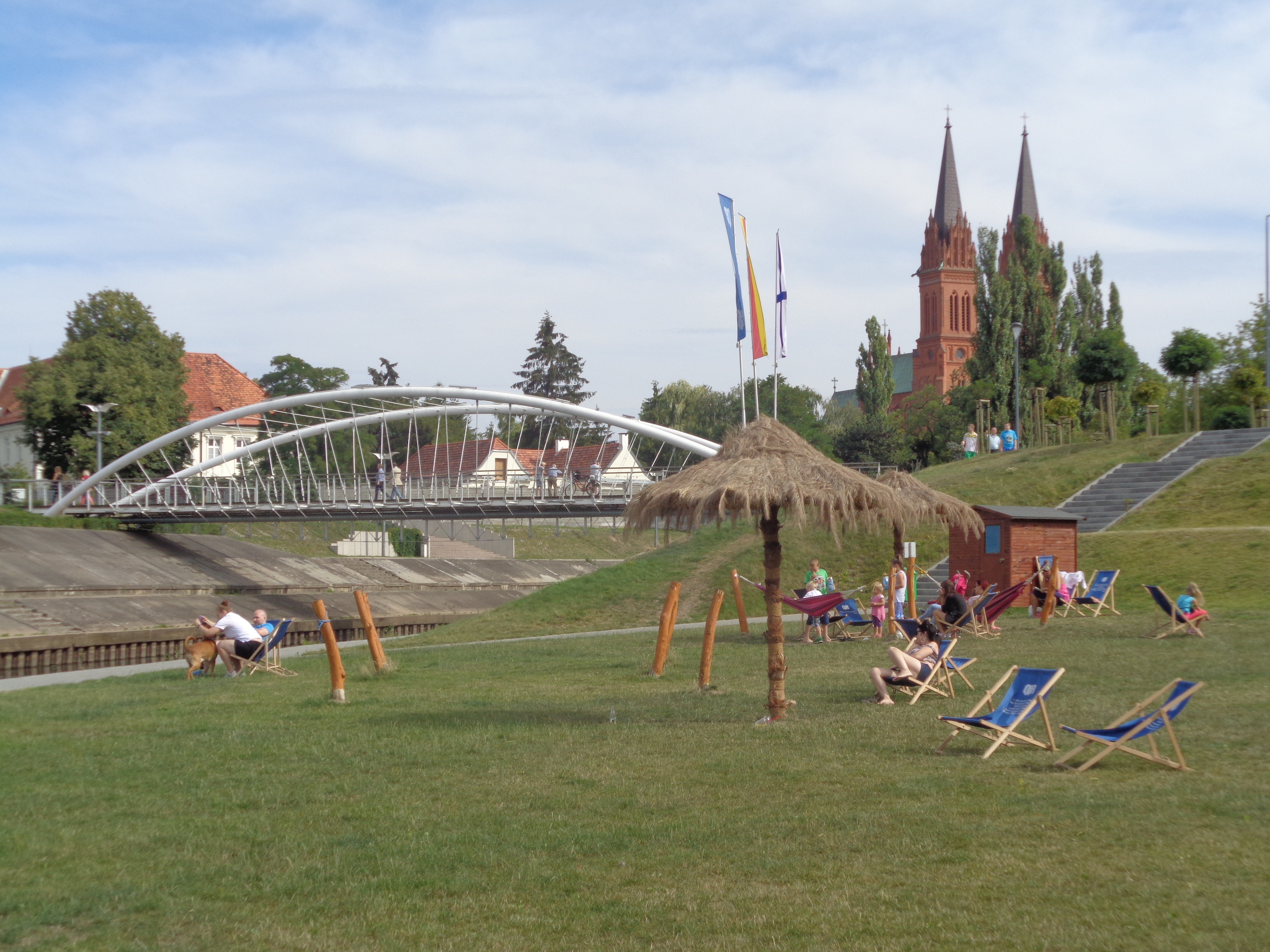
The square by the Jerzy Bojańczyk Marina in Włocławek

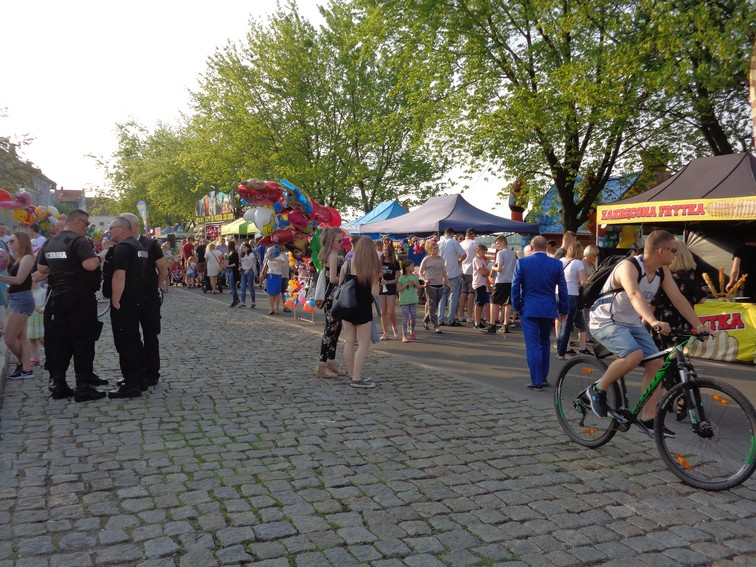
The May Holiday party on the Boulevards

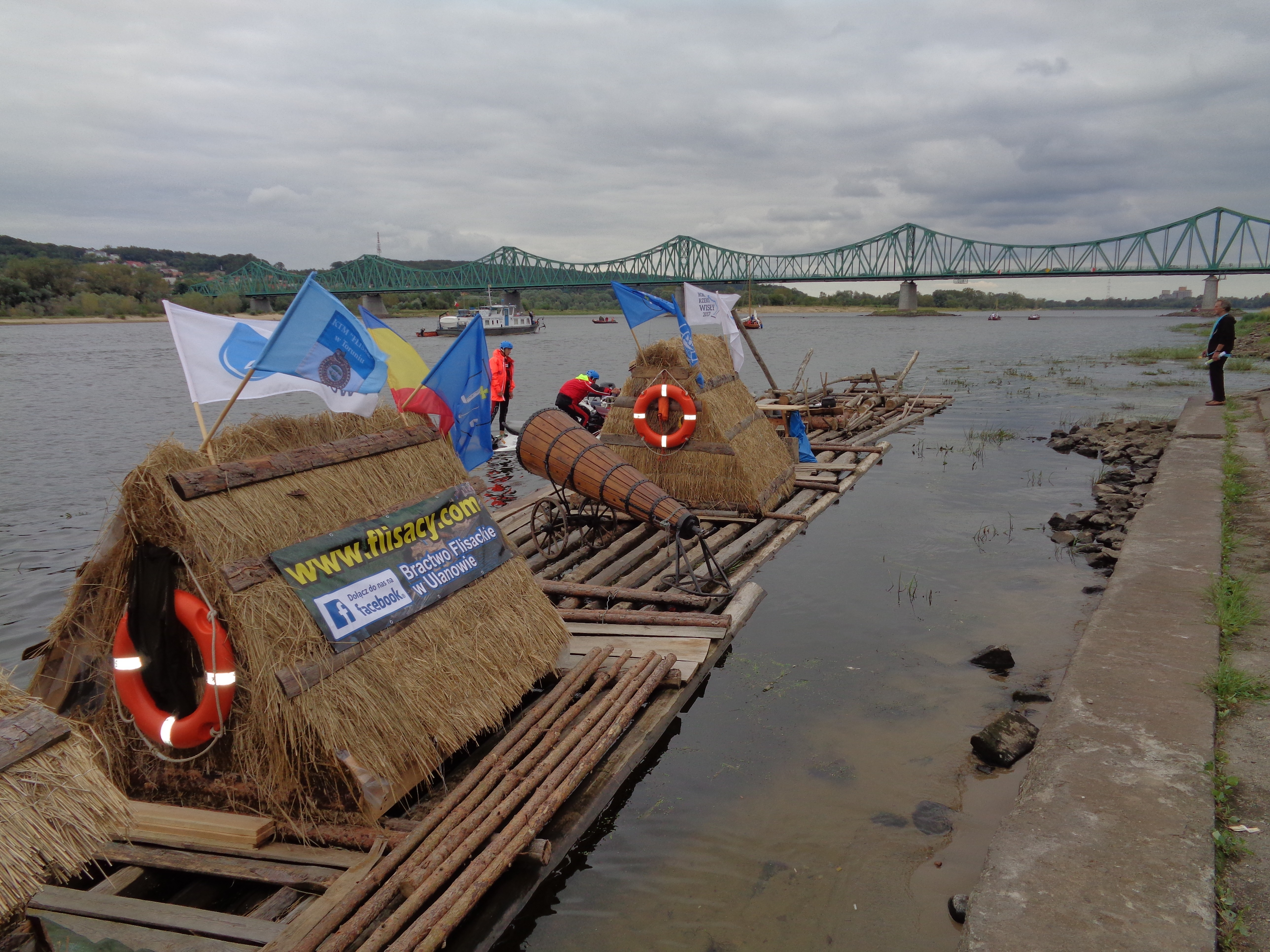
A replica of a flipper boat during the Vistula River Festival in Włocławek.

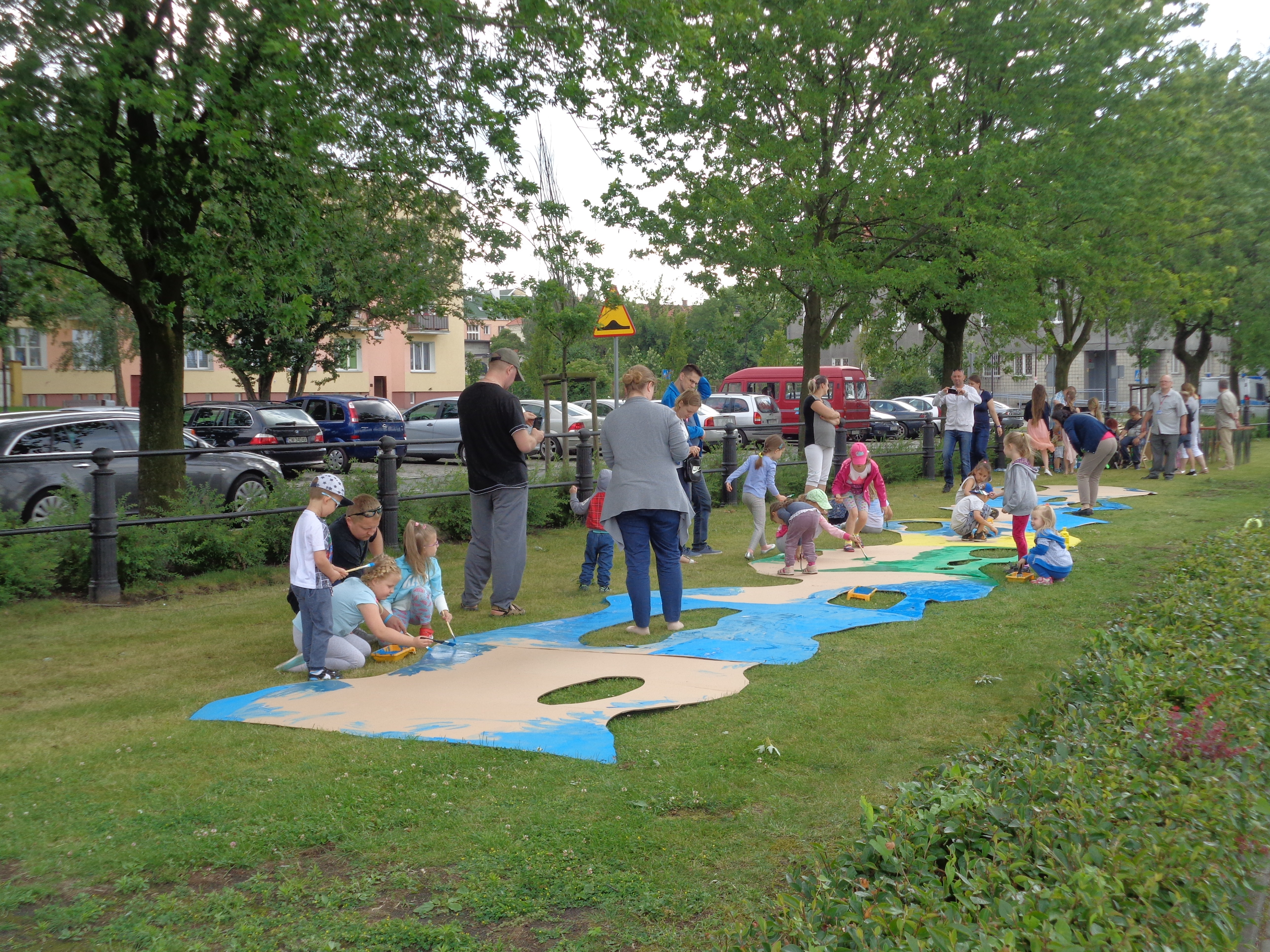
Children's games during the "Boulevard of Art and Sport", 2017.

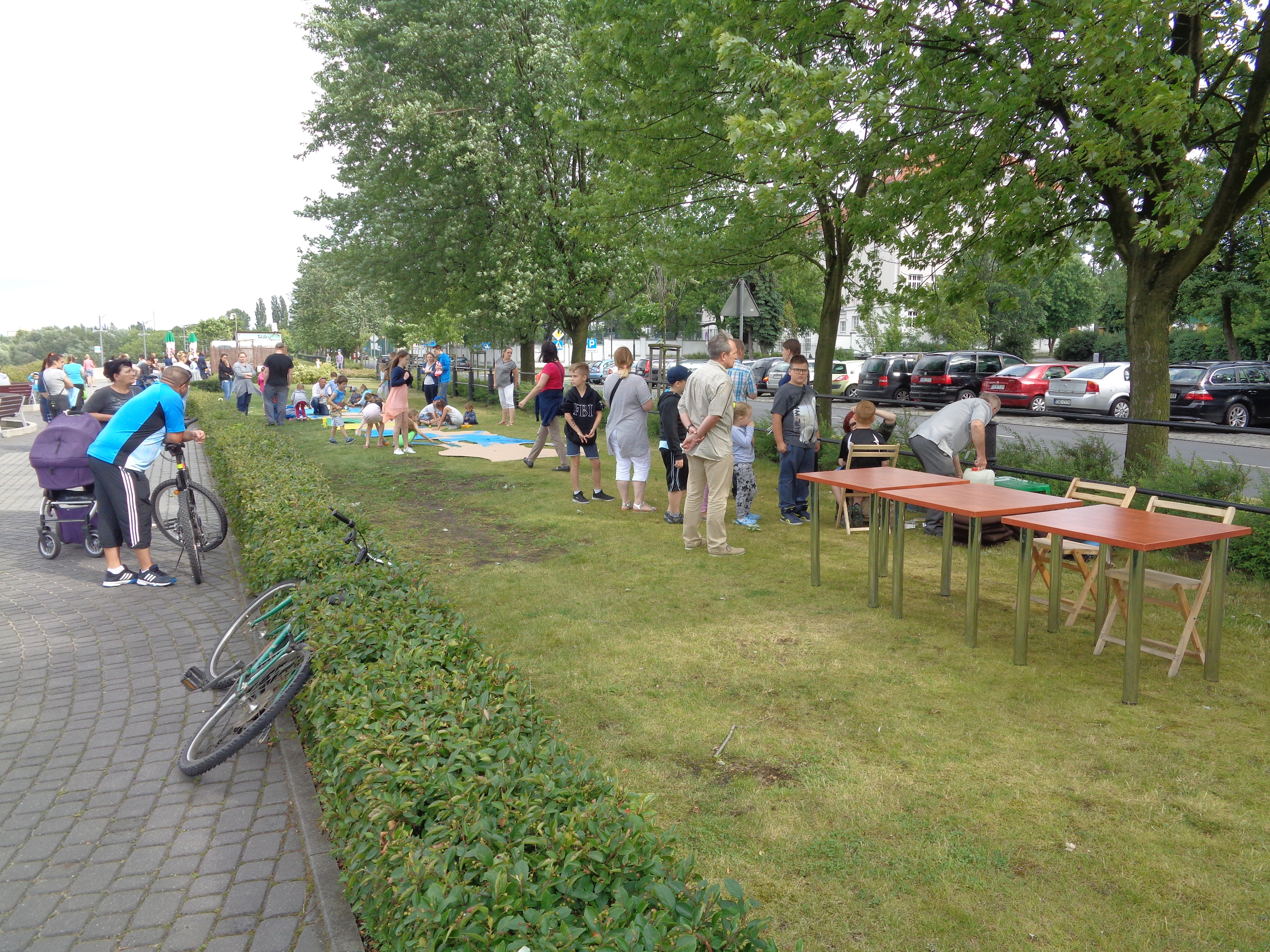
Stands during the "Boulevard of Art and Sport" in 2017 in Włocławek.

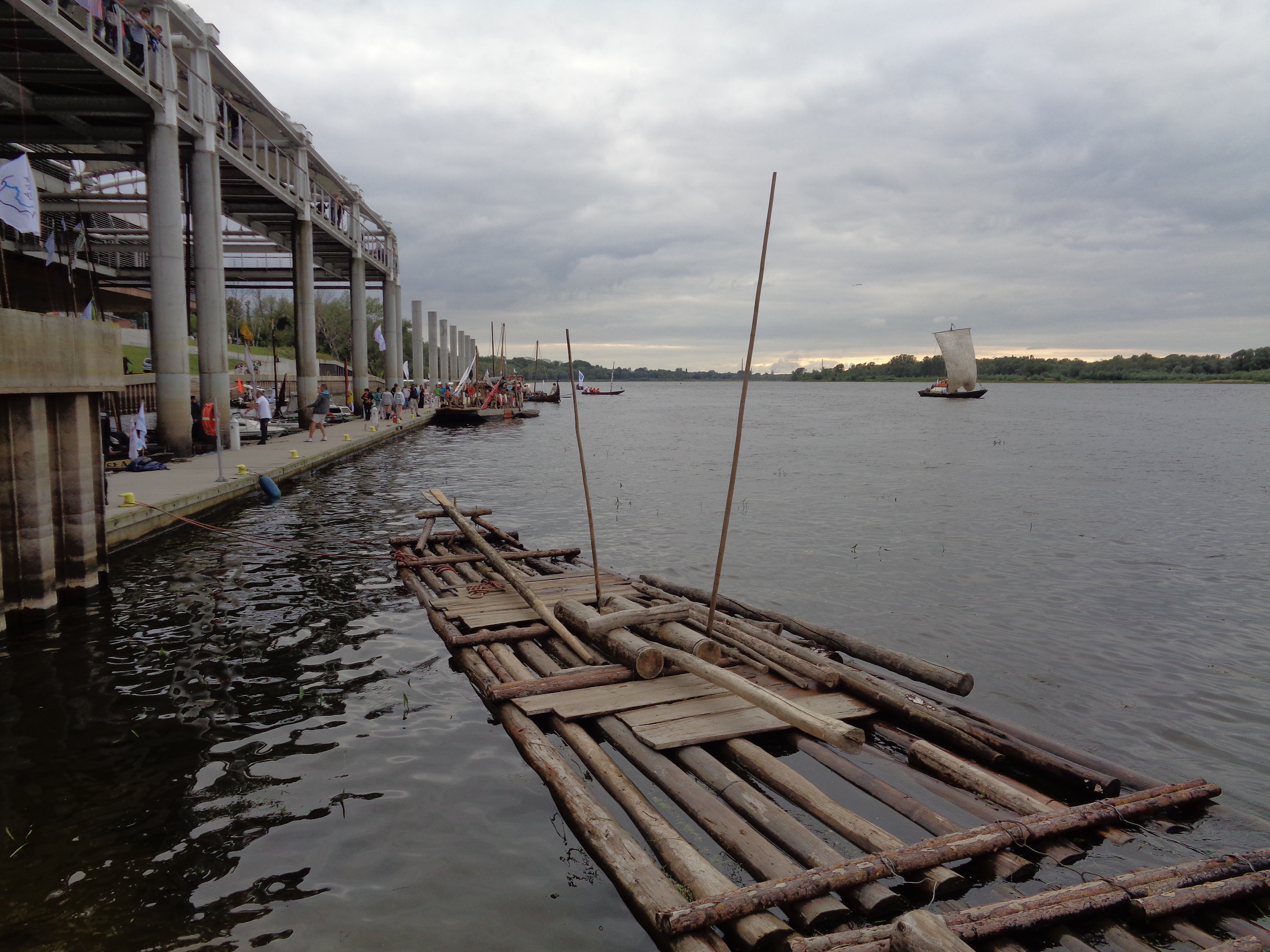
Vistula River Festival in Włocławek, 2017.

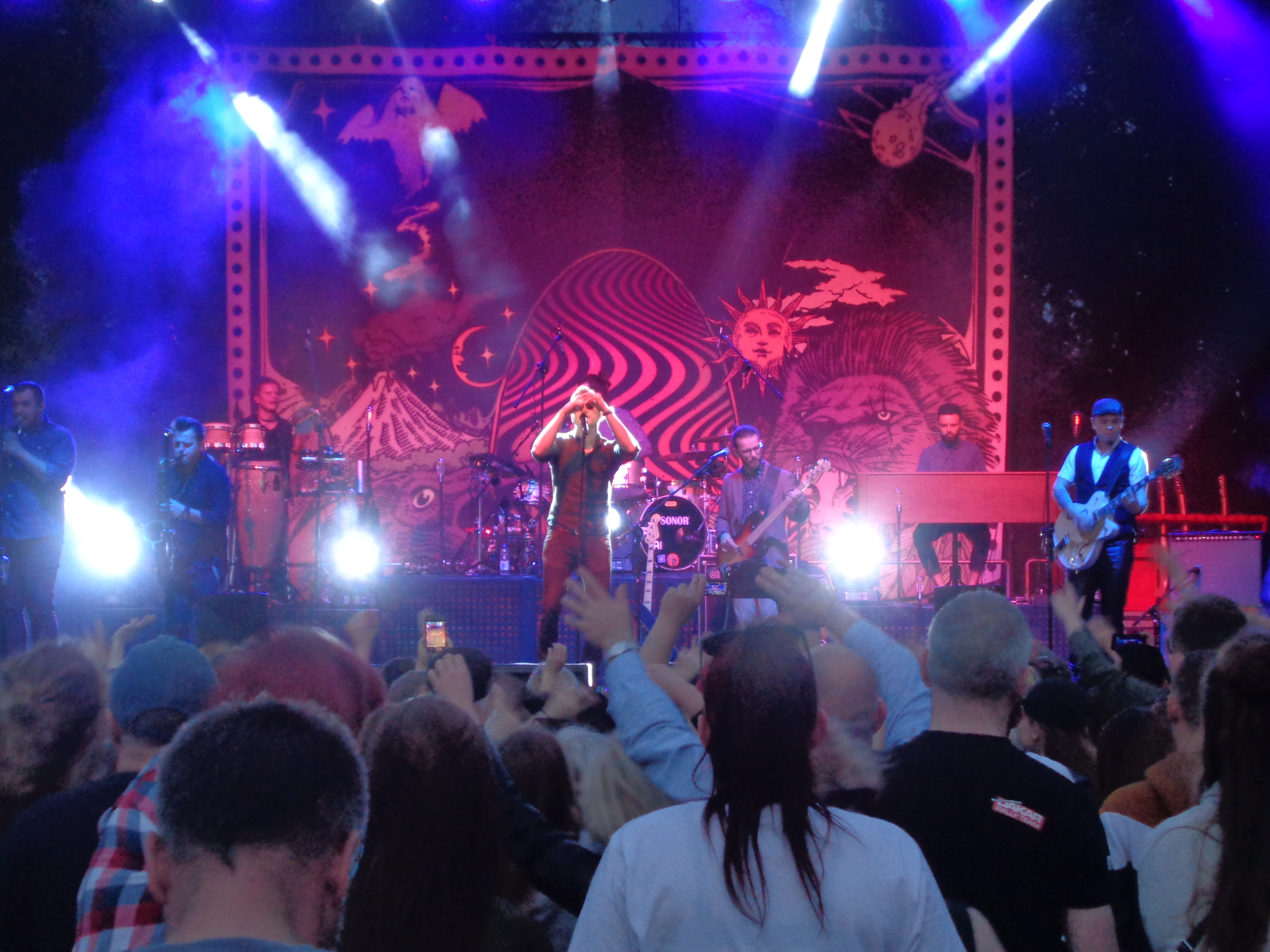
Mrozu concert during the May Holiday event on the Boulevards in Włocławek

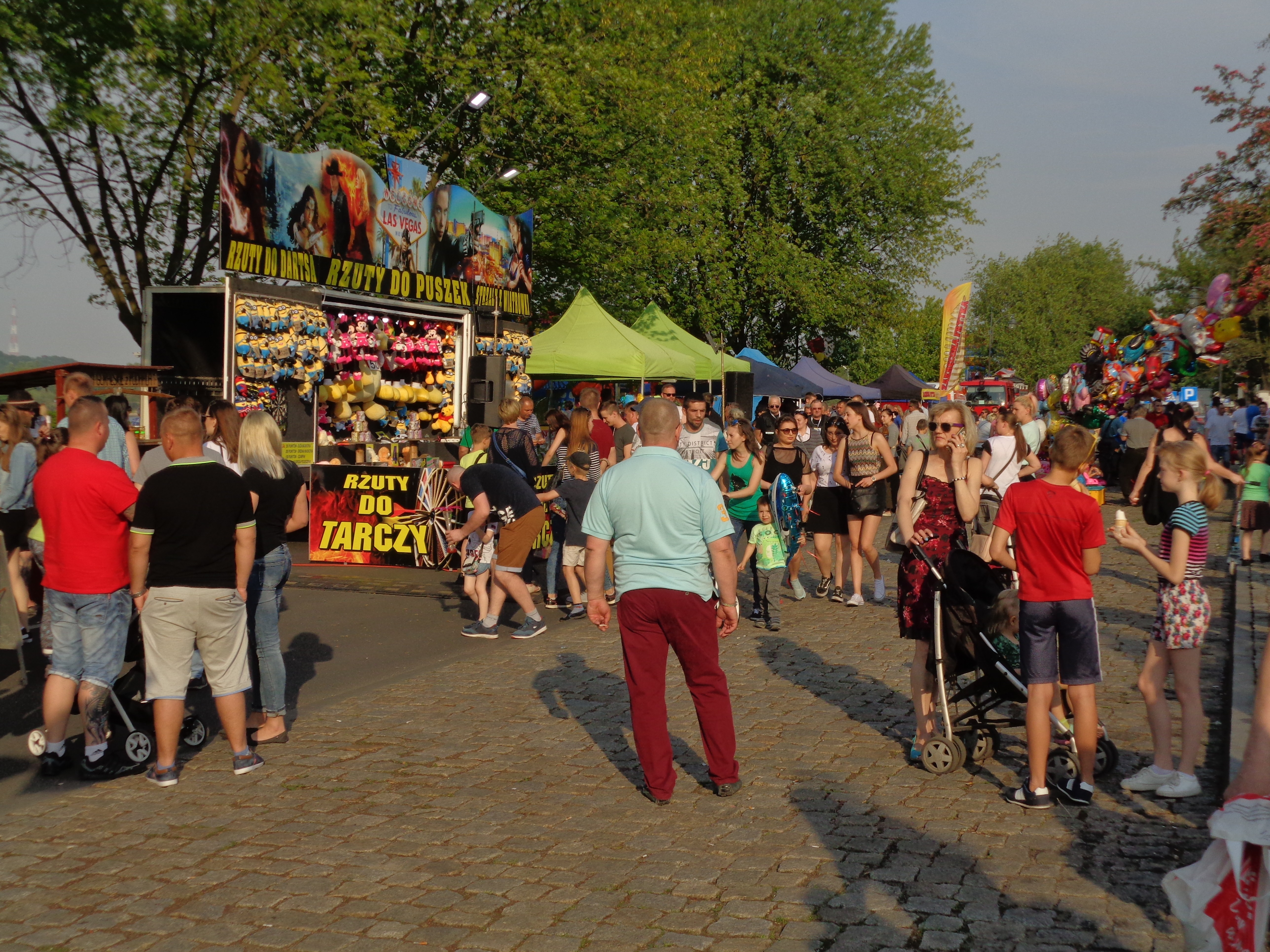
May Holiday on the boulevards in Włocławek
