= Włocławek Rowing Society =

Polish rowing club

The Włocławek Rowing Society is a rowing sports club founded in 1886 in Włocławek. A founding member of the Polish Rowing Societies Association. In the years 1921-1939 it functioned under the name "Rowing Society in Włocławek" and in the years 1945–1949 as the "Rowing Society".

== History ==
The club was founded on the initiative of the Polish intelligentsia, mainly thanks to the efforts of a lawyer from Włocławek - Bolesław Domaszewicz - and a doctor from Warsaw - Henryk Stankiewicz. Apart from promoting physical culture, it aimed to promote patriotism in partitioned Poland. A Polish reading room functioned in the club's premises, a men's choir "The Rowing Echo" also gave concerts. In 1903 a lecture by Henryk Sienkiewicz was organized, who came to Włocławek as an honorary member of the Society.

In 1887 Włocławek rowers organized the first local regatta on the Vistula, and fourteen years later they've managed to sail the Vistula upstream to Płock.

In the beginning, the Society's headquarters were located on Bulwarowa Street. It moved in 1894 to the premises at 77 Łęgska Street. The grand headquarters was not built until 1928 - at 3 Piwna Street, at the mouth of Zgłowiączka to the Vistula.

During World War I, the Society co-founded the local civic guard and established a primary school, many rowers joined the Polish Military Organisation.

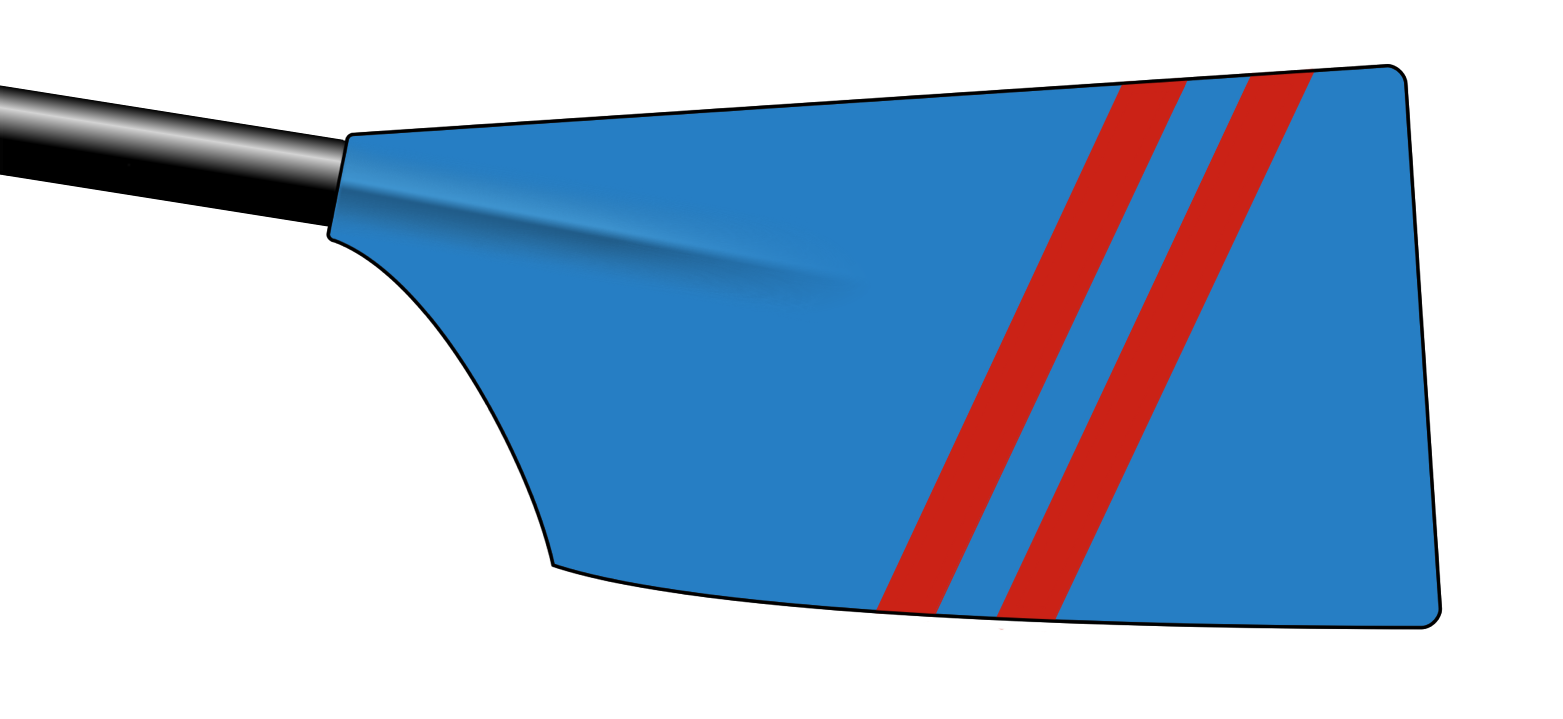
Club colors

In the interwar period, the club was enlarged by the women's section, as the Women Rowing Club, founded in 1919, was incorporated. For many years, starting in 1921, Jerzy Zygmunt Bojańczyk was the president of the club, a figure of exceptional merit for the city and local rowing. Bojańczyk himself sponsored the construction of the club's grand headquarters. His competence was highly valued, allowing him to chair the jury at the Olympic Games in Amsterdam (in 1928) and Berlin (in 1936).

In 1929 Wiktor Szelągowski, Henryk Grabowski and Tadeusz Gaworski won the first gold medal of the Polish Championship for the club, in the same year they also won the bronze medal of the European Championship. A year later the rowers achieved first place in the international regatta in Antwerp. In the interwar period, the Society was ranked among the ten best clubs of Poland on ten separate occasions.

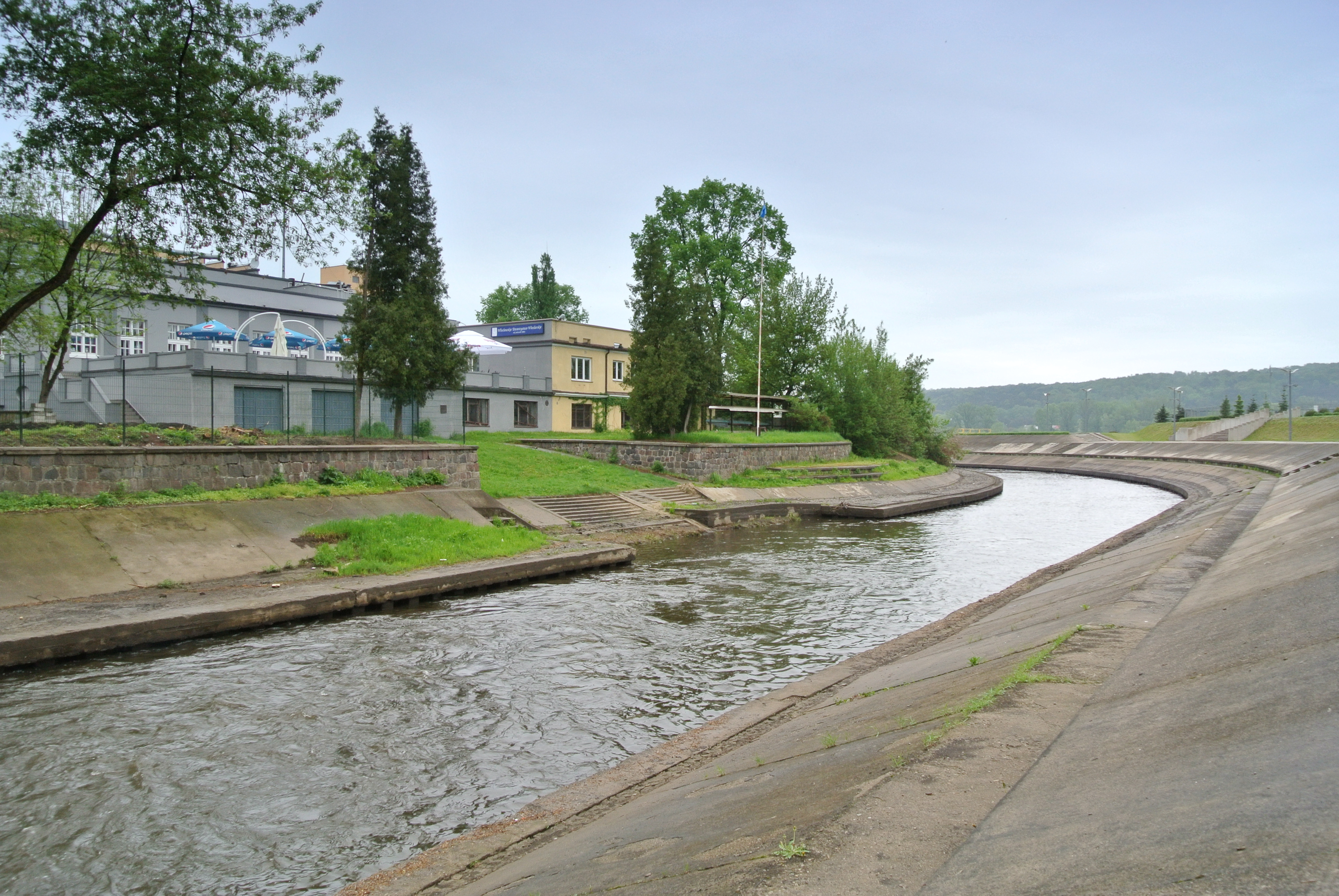
Former marina (not in use)

The war did not destroy the spirit of the Włocławek rowing industry, the equipment and buildings also survived. The Rowing Society, which was re-established just after the war, was again successful, it was ranked 4th out of 31 Polish clubs.

The communist authorities aimed to end the Society's independence, with its intellectual and elite origins, which finally happened in 1949, two years after Bojanczyk's death, when the organization was incorporated into the "Związkowiec" National Sports Division. After the centralization, rowing in Włocławek did not rise until the 1960s, mainly thanks to the involvement of coach Tadeusz Gawrysiak. His pupils (including Bogdan Piątek, Grzegorz Dudziński, Krzysztof Gabryelewicz, Marek Dudziński, Andrzej Peszyński) were awarded numerous national championship medals.

In 1987 the club became independent again - it was reactivated as the Włocławek Rowing Society.

== Controversy ==
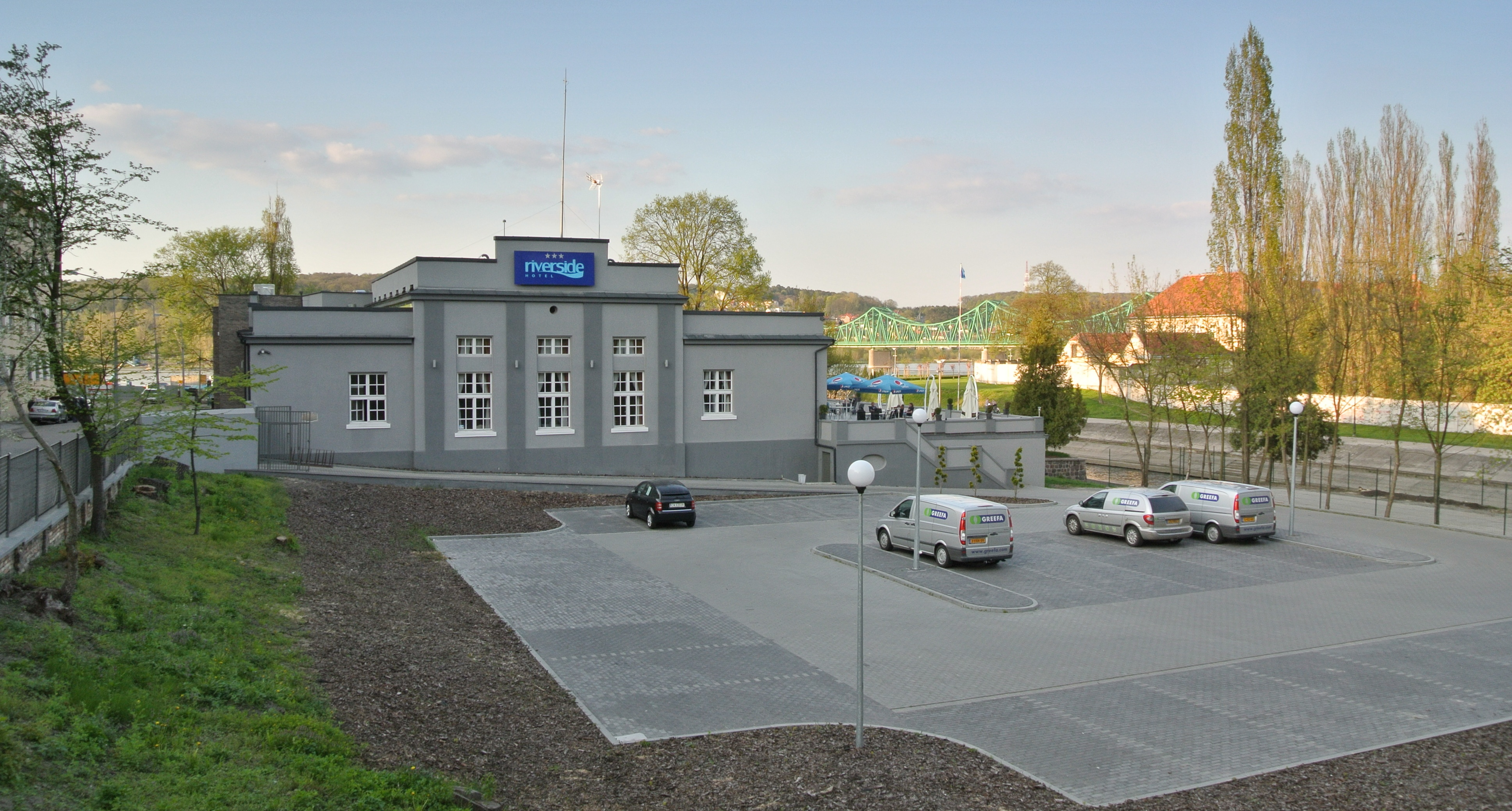
Former representative building (sold)

A controversial misunderstanding took place at the club in 2003, concerning the rectification of shares after a sale of a significant part of the real estate at 3 Piwna Street, which had been carried out five years earlier. The misunderstanding had to be clarified by the District Prosecutor's Office and the District Court. The case was being examined by the deputy general prosecutor.

== Changes in the financing arrangements ==
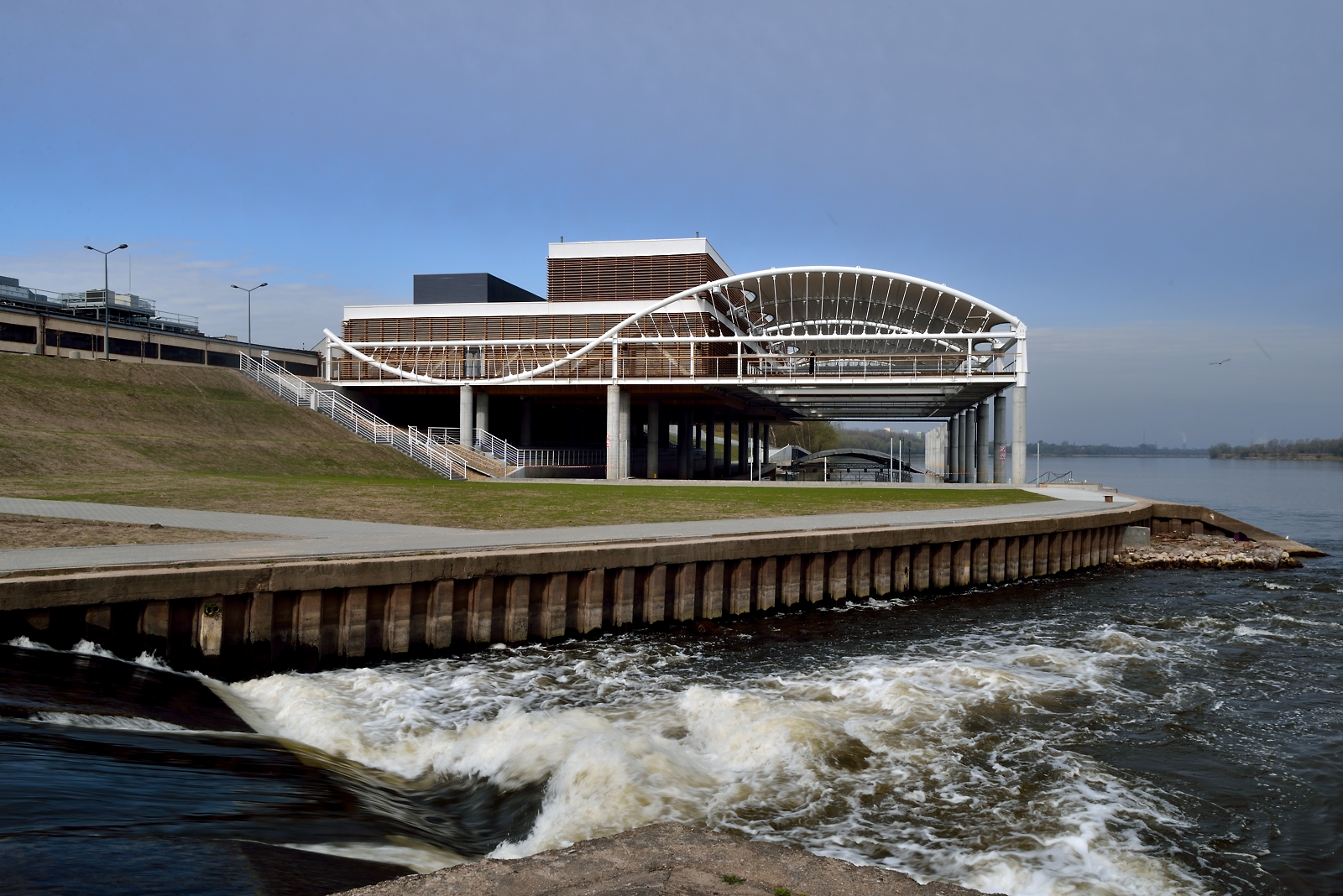
The city harbour at the mouth of Zgłowiączka to the Vistula River.

In the interwar period, members of the Society brought their private property into it, built it with their own money and maintained it by paying high membership fees. There were additional large donations from local entrepreneurs. At the end of the 1930s, Ferdinand Bohma's grain coffee factory joined the sponsors, thanks to that cooperation many young workers started to train in the club. Currently, the financing of the Society functions completely different. A significant part of the prestigious, historic buildings have been sold, the membership fees of the rowers are a margin of income, and the Society's coaches receive a normal salary for their work. The Society remains extensively active, largely thanks to the funding granted by the Municipal Office. The city also took care of the future of the club - a new marina for the rowers was built next to the old buildings.

== Current state ==
The Włocławek Rowing Society trains children and teenagers, the alumni are successful in sports on the national and international arena. Currently, the best and most successful player of the Society is Fabian Barański. In 2019, together with Mirosław Ziętarski, he won the title of European Champion in double scull and the title of World Vice-Champion in quad scull (Szymon Pośnik, Dominik Czaja, Wiktor Chabel).

The following members are also considered exepctionally successful: Oliwia Muraska, Magdalena Szprengiel, Piotr Śliwiński, Weronika Klasińska, Wiktoria Klasińska, Julia Gęsicka.

During the celebration of the 120th anniversary (2006), the Włocławek Rowing Society was awarded the gold medal of the Polish Olympic Committee.
