= Botanic Garden of Casimir the Great University, Bydgoszcz =

City park, 20th century, Bydgoszcz, Poland

Coordinates: 53°7′51″N 18°1′3″E

Botanic Garden of Casimir the Great University
- Ogród Botaniczny Uniwersytetu Kazimierza Wielkiego w Bydgoszczy
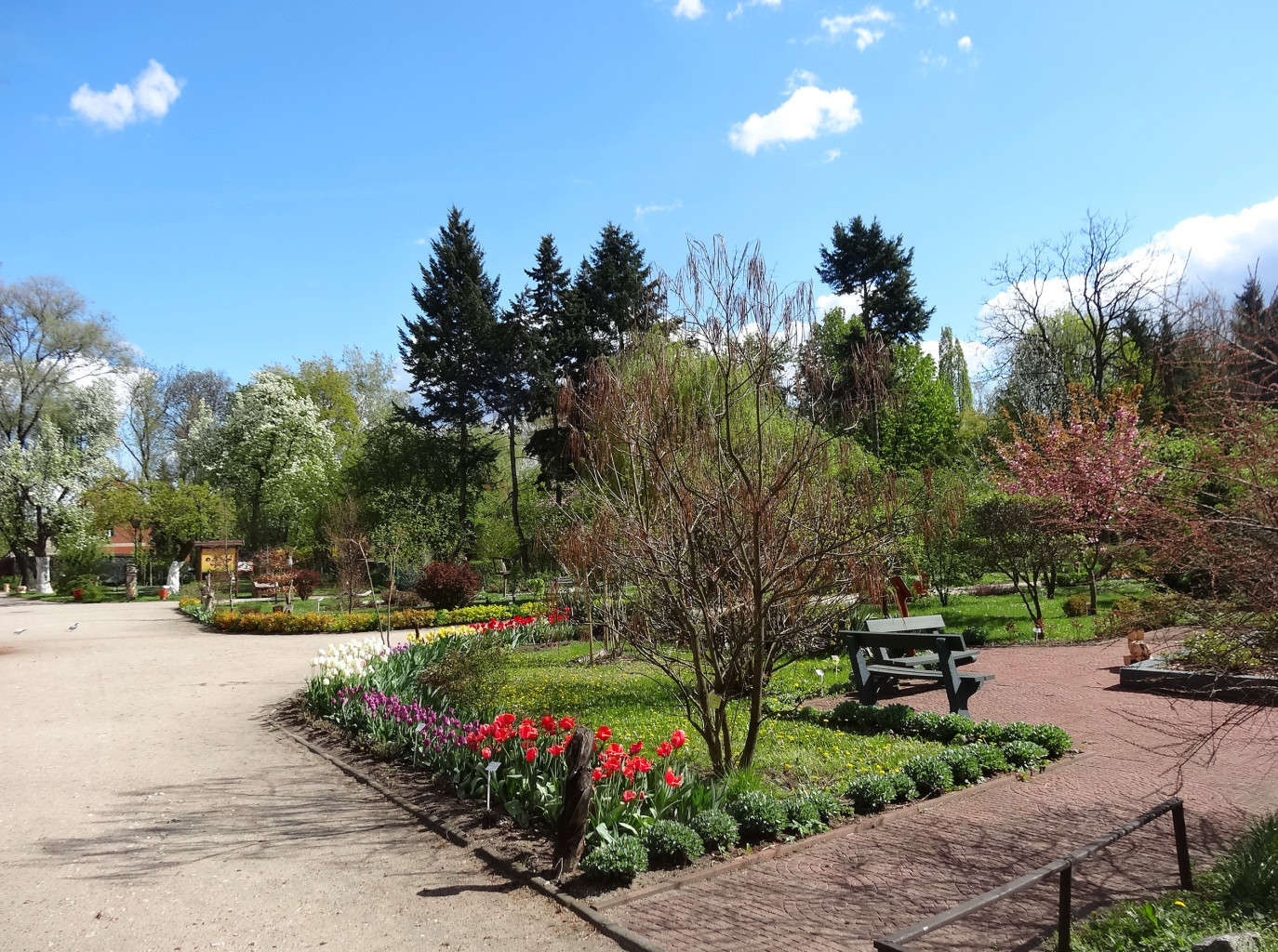
- View of garden parterres
- Interactive map of Botanic Garden of Casimir the Great University
- Type: Botanic and urban garden
- Location: Bydgoszcz, Poland
- Area: 2.33 hectares (5.8 acres)
- Created: 1930
- Operator: Kazimierz Wielki University in Bydgoszcz
- Open: 1 May to 30 September
- Plants: 400 species of trees/shrubs, 700 species of herbaceous plants

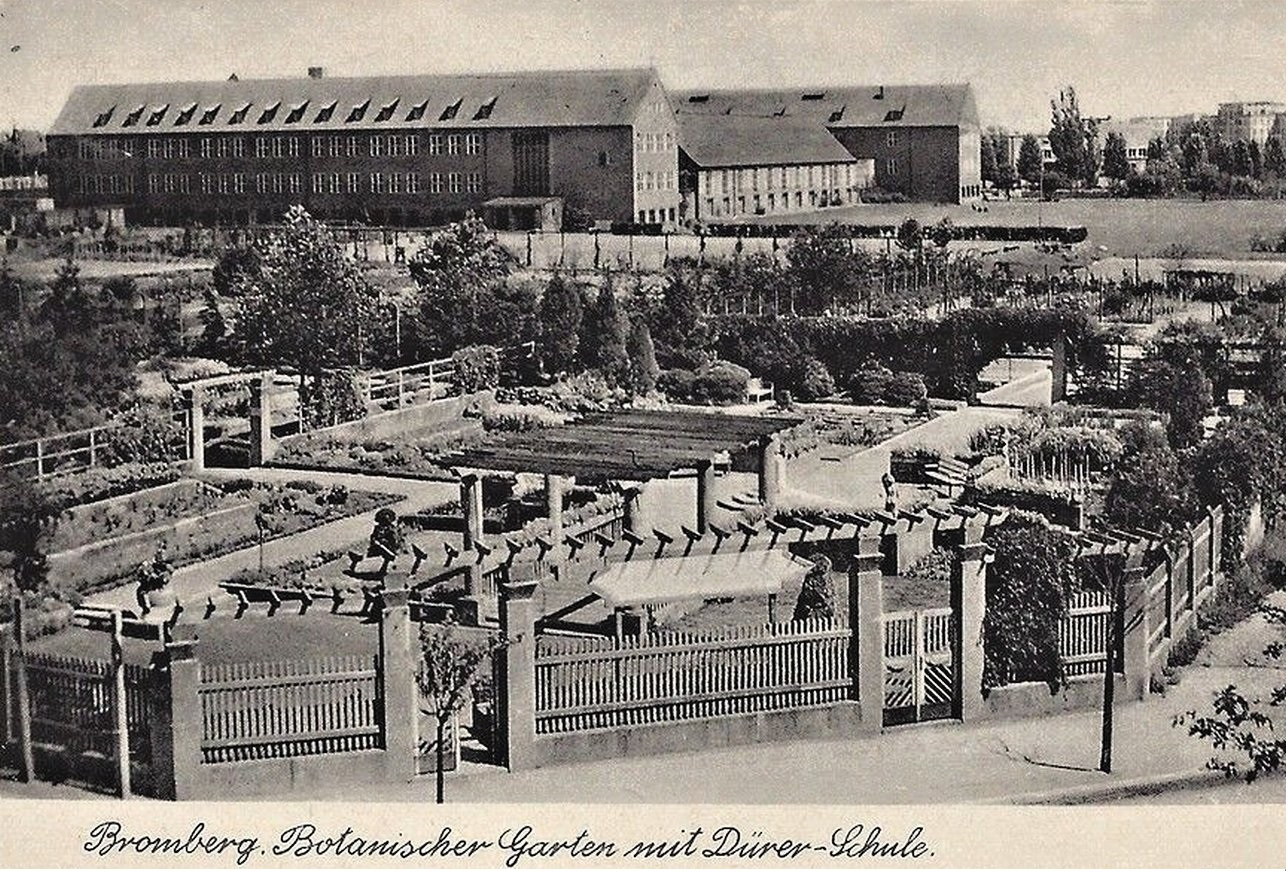
Arboretum ca 1940

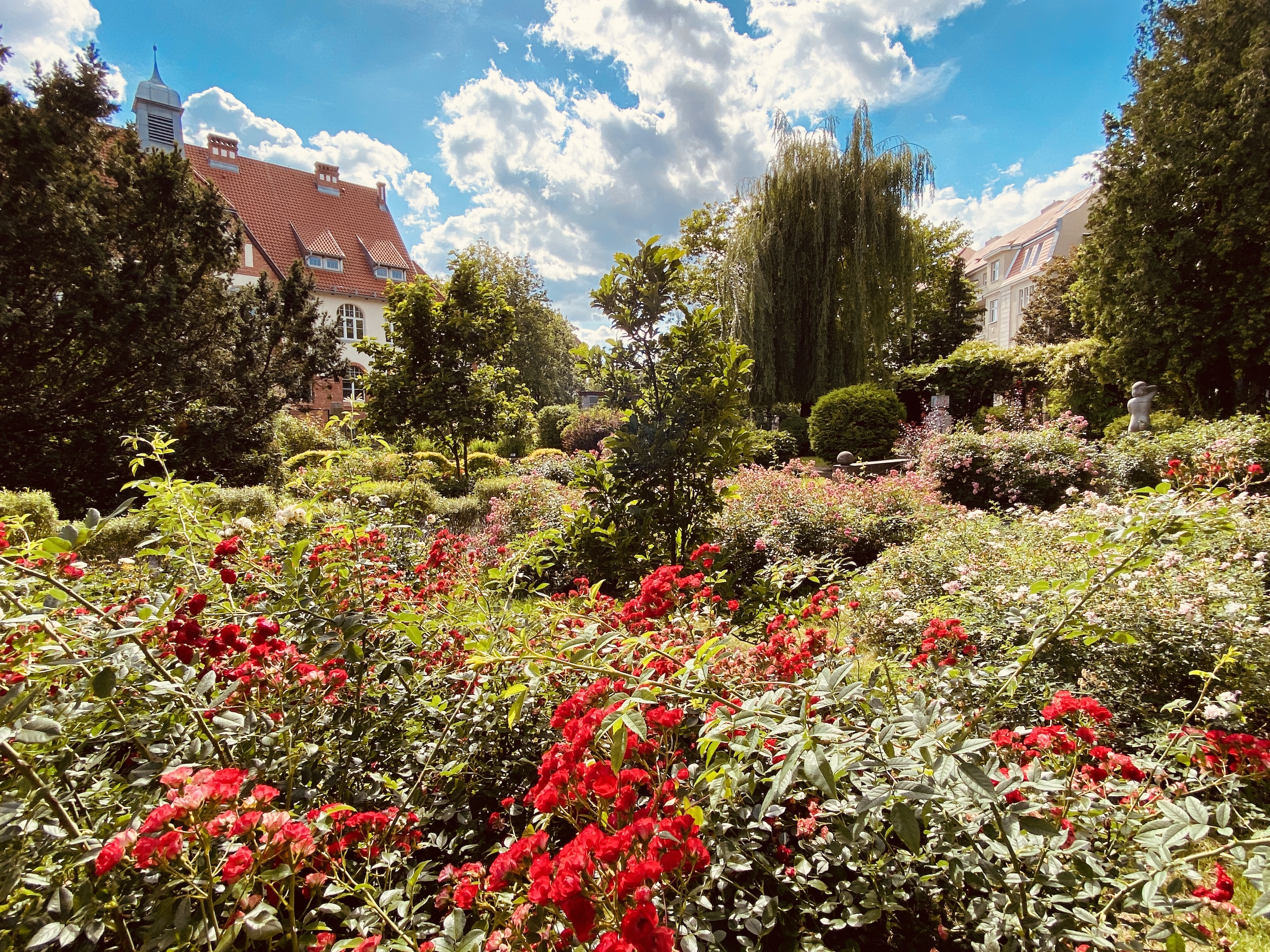
Rosarium

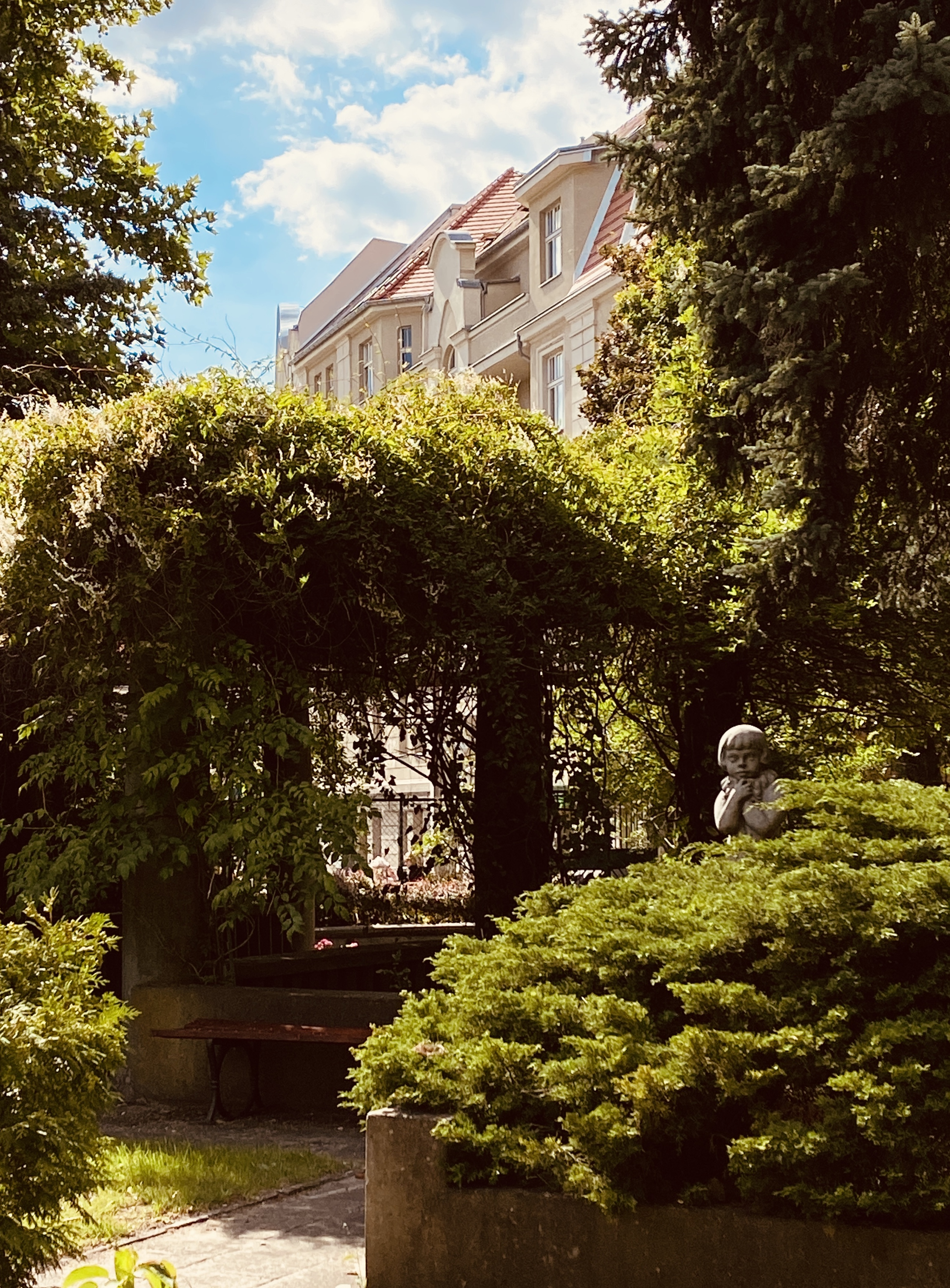
Pergola

The Botanic Garden of Casimir the Great University is located in the center of Bydgoszcz, close to the main campus of the Kazimierz Wielki University in Bydgoszcz (Polish: Uniwersytet Kazimierza Wielkiego w Bydgoszczy-UKW). The facility fulfils several roles: scientific research, but also didactic and recreational activities.

== Location and aims ==
The site occupies the site of the former Botanic Garden of Bydgoszcz downtown. The garden is 240 metres (790 ft) long and 80 metres (260 ft) large, bordered by the following streets: Chodkiewicza, Niemcewicza and Powstańców Wielkopolskich. On the east lies the main and historic campus of the UKW.

The mission of the garden is to collect, cultivate and display selected herbaceous species, trees, shrubs and phytocoenosis for scientific purposes, didactics and popularization. Scientific research is regularly conducted on site (e.g. mycorrhiza study on selected species, assessment of the insect pollination, study of large fungi). The garden participates every year to the Bydgoszcz Science Festival, an annual popular-science event organised by Bydgoszcz universities and non-academic institutions since 2010.

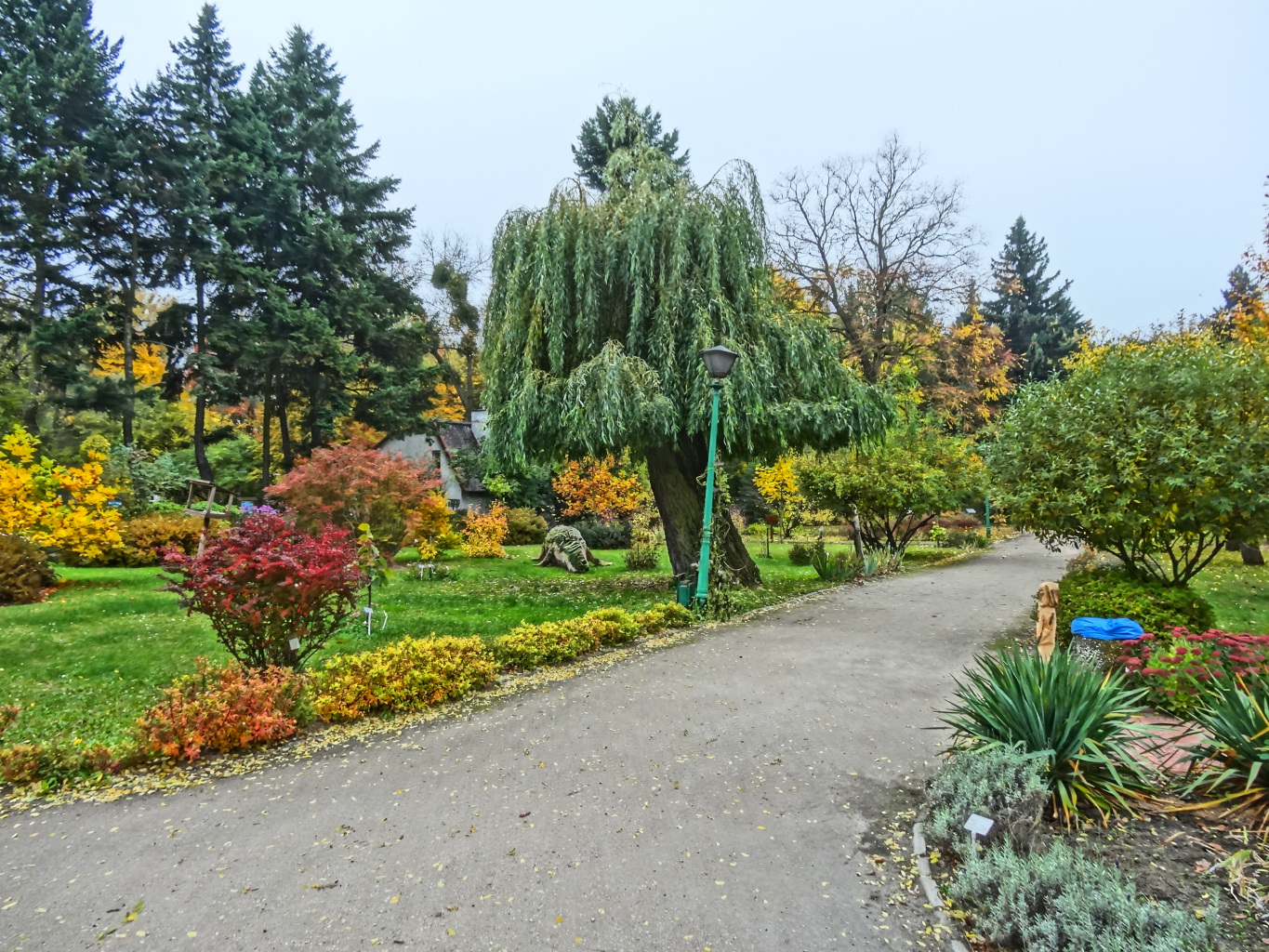
Parterre

== History ==
The Arboretum was established in 1930 on the site of a former school garden called Botanik, smaller in size than today (0.71 ha). It was part of a city botanic garden ensemble, managed by engineer Marian Güntzel.

During World War II, this facility was partially devastated by the necessary earthworks related to the defense of the city. After the war, municipal authorities decided to restore the site to its original appearance. As such, on January 26, 1946, City Board of Bydgoszcz passed a resolution to grant the Botanic Garden with the status of research institution, with a separate organizational structure. The area was increased to 2.5 hectares, and a villa was assigned to the management of the arboretum, together with commercial buildings, both adjacent to Niemcewicza street. Originally, a Museum of Natural History and Natural Sciences was planned to be established in these buildings.

Between 1946 and 1951, technical installations were set up, a small greenhouse and a farm house were built and the garden gradually replenished with new species of trees and bushes, native and foreign. In 1946, the city botanic garden was officially opened, with Andrzej Michalski as first director.

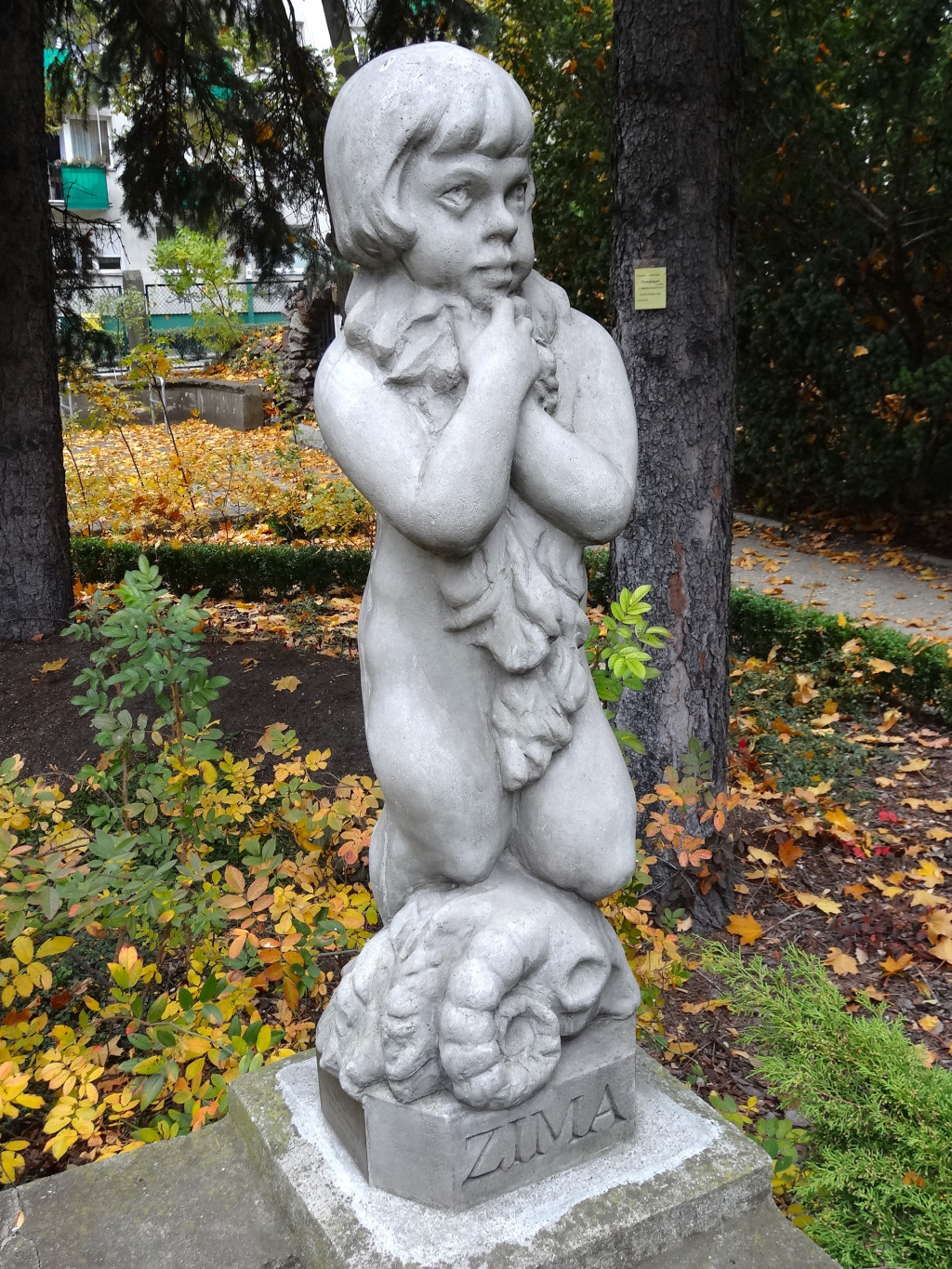
Winter allegory

In 1951, the garden was handed over to the Plant Breeding and Acclimatization Institute (Polish: Instytutowi Hodowli i Aklimatyzacji Roślin, IHAR) which ran it until 1979. IHAR facility is still present today at Powstańców Wielkopolskich Street 10. Since 1971, the arboretum has been part of the Polish Central Plant Collection.

Nonetheless, garden's main task has always been popularization of the diversity of the world of plants, both native and foreign, towards visitors, by giving the opportunity to face "in the flesh" the multiplicity of plants in an urban environment. Botanik has been covering -since its re-creation in 1951- various fields of biology, plant morphology, plant pathology, dendrology. In the 1970s, the garden had gathered 300 species of plants, and published annually a Seed Catalog, exchanging grains with other botanic gardens in Poland and abroad.

In 1977, decision was made to create a larger Botanic Garden in Bydgoszcz in the north-eastern part of the Forest Park of Culture and Leisure (Polish: Leśny Park Kultury i Wypoczynku, Myślęcinek), downgrading the old Botanik to an urban public park.

In 1995, with the help of Voivodeship Nature Conservator, Engineer Marek Wilcz, the park was granted the status of Comprehensive Natural Monument, as an arboretum. In 1999, the botanic garden, comprising about 220 species of trees and shrubs, was handed over to the UKW and became a didactic and scientific laboratory of the Department of Botany of the Institute of Biology and Environmental Protection of the Faculty of Natural Sciences. Since then, a gradual revitalization of the garden has begun:

- In 2002, the pond was modernized and a number of small architectural elements have been established (Rose garden, rural garden with an insect habitat and a cactus garden);
- Since 2006, UKW runs the area in accordance with the Nature Conservation Act. The Botanic garden is now a member of the Polish Botanic Gardens Council;
- Since 2010, in the building of the former garden library, an Arboretum Gallery has been set up, presenting art pieces and pictures.

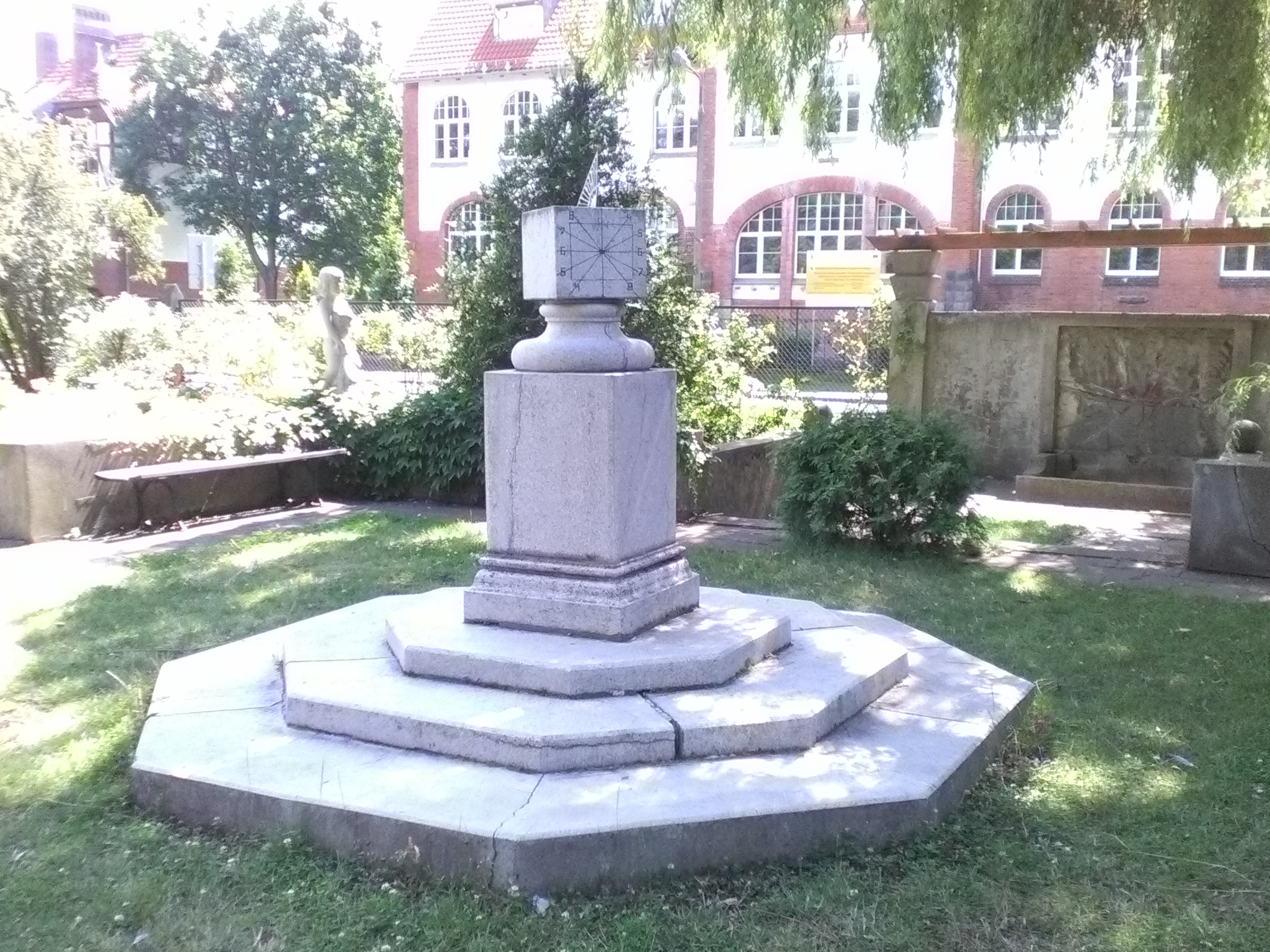
Sundial

The manager of the Arboretum since 1999 is Barbara Wilbrandt.

The revitalization project of the arboretum was included in the Bydgoszcz Development Program 2009-2014. It encompassed the renovation and reconstruction of the technical infrastructure (i.e. greenhouses, pergolas, sundials, sculptures, walls, gates fences, water and alpine plants and others) and the revitalization of the botanical area (e.g. reconstruction of stands, creation of a parterres for endangered and protected plants).

== Characteristics ==
The garden occupies a partly covered area featuring wide, mildly descending terraces, with a slight slope from north to south. Nowadays, around 400 species of trees and shrubs and 700 species of herbaceous plants, both from native and foreign origins, are gathered there. The arboretum is divided into sections: plant biology, ecology, systematics, useful plants, medicinal plants, ornamental plants, arboretum and orchard. Within the ecology area have been re-created on a 50 m^{2} surface the flora of mountains, inland dunes, steppes, salt flats, peatlands and ponds.

Among the built structures, one can notice stone arches, pergolas, and a small courtyard showing on its centre a sundial, with four stone sculptures (1.5 metres (4.9 ft) tall) standing in corners, portraying the seasons. This allegoric ensemble, called The four parts of the year, was in the initial 1930's botanic garden lay out, offered by Polish sculptor Bronisław Kłobucki (1896-1944). They have been lost, together with the sundial, when the new botanic garden at Myślęcinek opened in 1979. Thanks to sponsoring efforts (Ewa Taterczynska Foundation and Bydgoszcz Pomeranian Gas Company), the decorative courtyard has been restored to its original shape and location. Stone figures Autumn (Polish: Jesień) and Winter (Polish: Zima) have been realized by Stanisław Radwański from Gdańsk and set back in the arboretum in mid-May 2008 and on March 22, 2010. Last two sculptures, also by Stanisław Radwański, have been placed back to the garden on September 18, 2014 (Spring - Polish: Wiosna), and on October 17, 2015, (Summer - Polish: Lato). In addition, the lost sundial has been replicated by Richard Lewandowski.

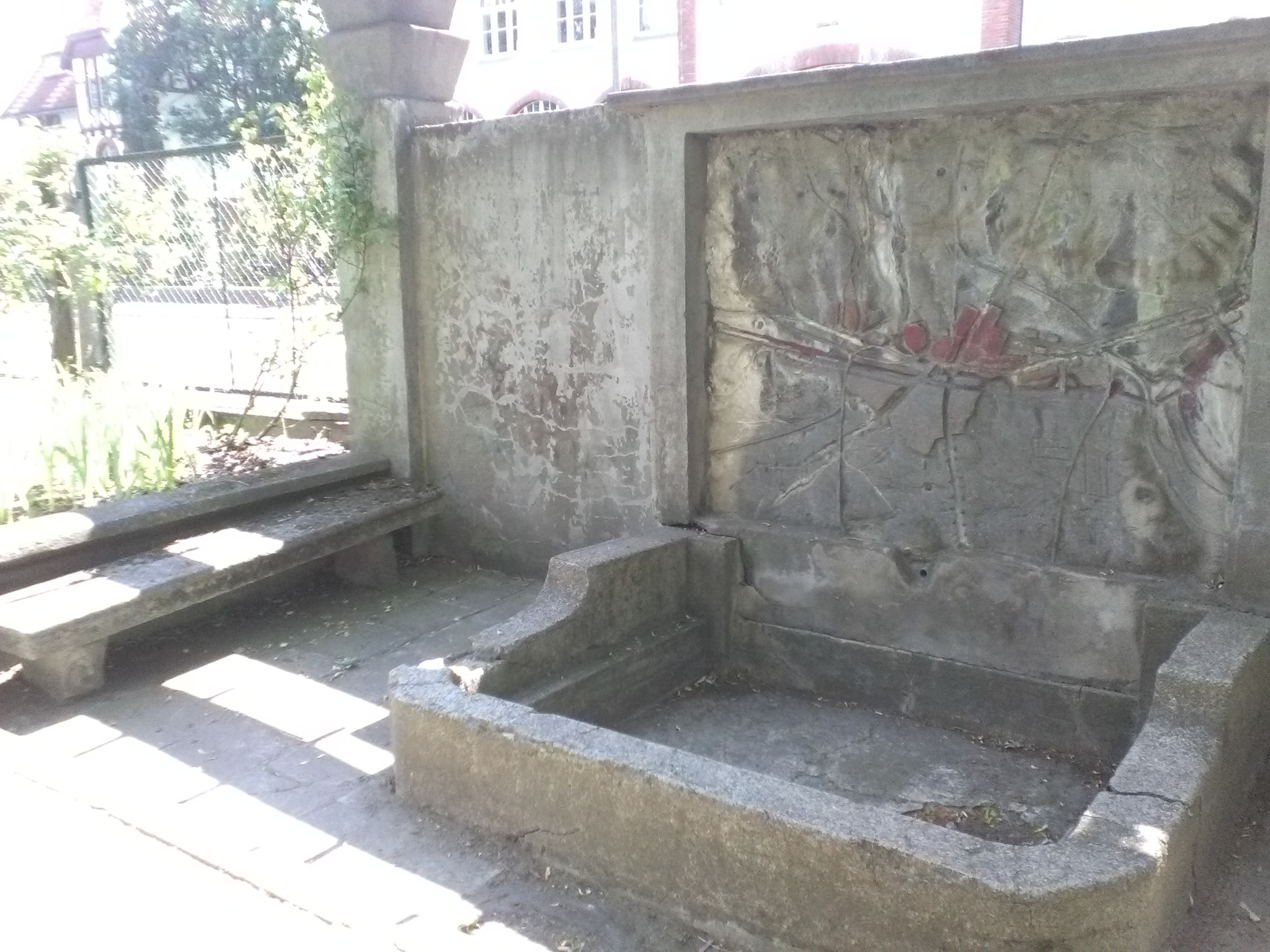
Relief map of Bydgoszcz

On the southern side of the Botanic Garden stands, along the fence, a 1930 relief displaying a map of Bydgoszcz. Made of artificial stone by Bronisław Kłobucki, author of the allegory figures of the seasons, the plan exposes rivers, valleys, hills, waters, railways, selected roads and buildings. The relief was accompanied by water sprayers (now non-existent) and two stone benches with mascarons.

In 1979, the sculptor Stanisław Horno-Popławski moved to a small house in the Botanic Garden, which he used as a studio. On July 22 of this year, then the official holiday in the Polish People's Republic, Horno-Popławski opened in the garden permanent outdoor exhibition of his compositions, which he donated to the city. Called Stone Stream (Polish: Potok Kamienny), the collection included the following works: "Partisan", "Memories of Bagrati", "Morena", "Copernicus", "Tadeusz Breyer", "Tehura", "Gruzinka", "Waiting", "Szota Rustawelli", "Colchida", "Żal", "Pogodna", "Beethoven" and "Hair". These artworks are now incorporated into the rich vegetation of the Garden, giving it a poetic look.

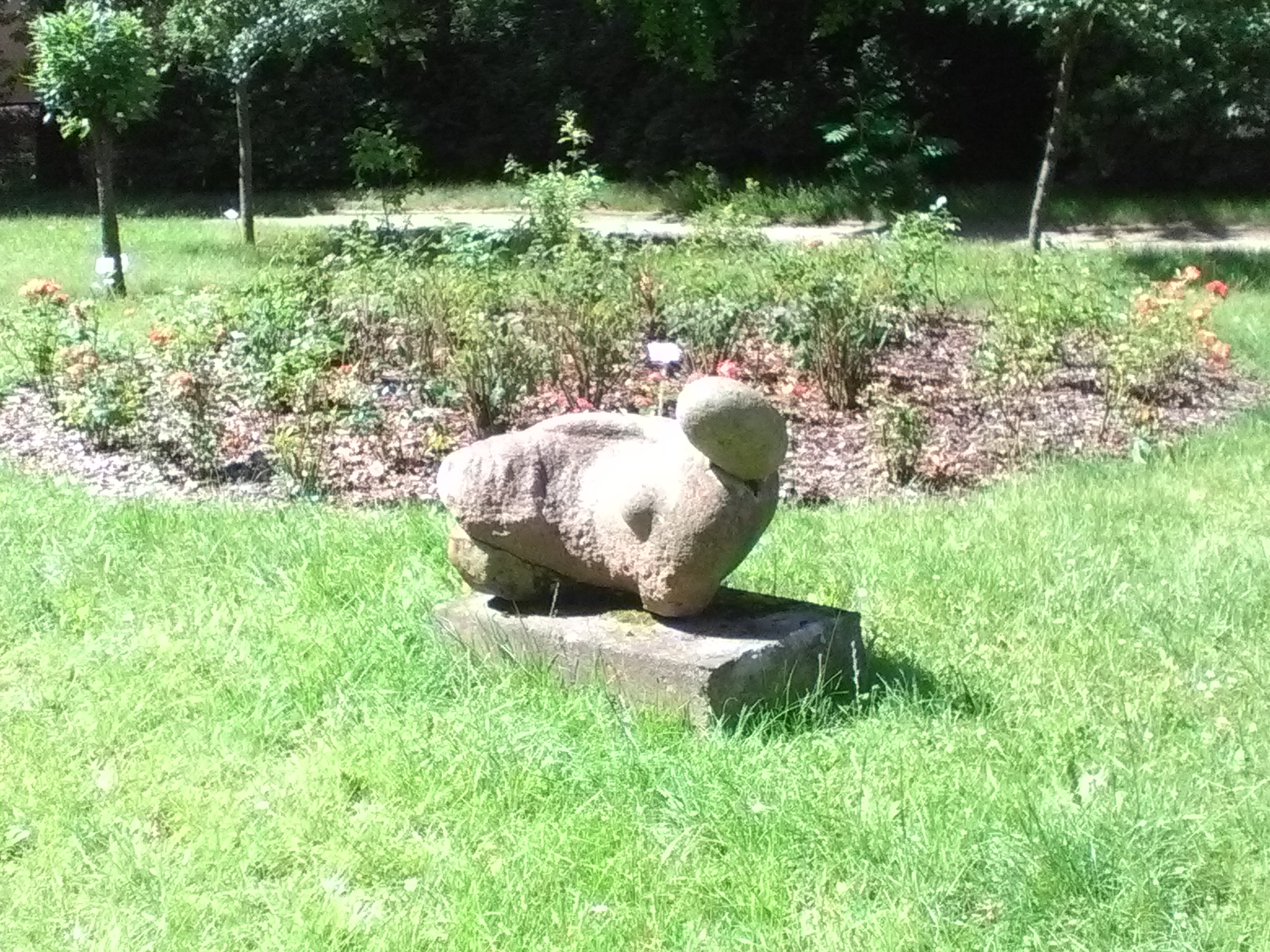
Stanisław Horno-Popławski Sculpture

== Species and vegetation ==
The collection of trees and shrubs of the arboretum counts 660 species and plant varieties, including 65 families, 161 species and 13 crossbreedings. They are from diverse origins: native, foreign, legally protected and relict species. Most represented plants are roses (143 varieties), maples (26), junipers (24), birches (15), spindle trees (13) and dogwoods (11).

Relict species (flourishing time dating back to other geological periods):

- Betula humilis, birch family - post-glacial relic;
- Ginkgo biloba, considered as a living fossil;
- Japanese elm - Japanese tertiary era relic.

Legally protected species:

- European Bladdernut;
- Sea Buckthorn;
- Swedish Whitebeam;
- Mountain Pine;
- Japanese and English yews;
- Swiss Pine;
- Dwarf Birch;
- Mongolian Cherry;
- February Daphne;
- Dwarf Periwinkle.

Coniferous species:

- White Fir;
- Eastern Emlock;
- Douglas Fir;
- Ginkgo;
- Giant Sequoia;
- Siberian Carpet Cypress;
- Cedar;
- Larch, Pine, Spruce, Fir, Cypress, Thuja and Juniper.

Other evergreen species:

- Boxwood;
- Thorny Scarlet firethorn;
- Common Mistletoe.

Other species:

- Willow;
- White Mulberry;
- Common Ash;
- Common beech.

Exotic species (generally imported to Europe from overseas countries as park and garden ornamental plants):

- Kentucky coffeetree;
- Balsam Poplar, native of Northern America river banks;
- Sweet Shrub;
- Katsura;
- Cornish Oak;
- Russian Olive, originating from Balkans valleys;
- American Hackberry;
- Sweet Chestnut;
- Ailanthus, Asian Tree;
- Indian-bean-tree;
- Korean Evodia;
- Quince;
- Saucer Magnolia, from Asia and North America.

Far East species (among others):

- Ginkgo;
- Dawn Redwood (endangered species);
- Bhutan Pine;
- Asunaro;
- Eucommia ulmoides (near-threatened in the wild);
- Chinese Kolkwitzia;
- Phellodendron.

North America species (among others):

- Sequoia, White Fir, Eastern Emlock, Bladdernut tree;
- Osga Orange;
- Eastern Black Walnut;
- Bottlebrush Buckeye;
- Desert False Indigo;
- Tulip Tree;
- Umbrella Magnolia.

Native species of the park include, among others, different varieties of poplar, maple, birch and Austrian Oak growing near the main entrance.

=== Aquatic plants ===
Aquatic flora in the arboretum counts over 100 species.

=== Avifauna ===
The Botanic Garden is home to numerous birds:

- Bohemian waxwings (flocks of 320 individuals in winter period);
- Tits (Coal tit, Great tit, Eurasian blue tit);
- Common wood pigeon;
- Eurasian nuthatch.

Eurasian sparrowhawks are regularly observed.

== Gallery ==
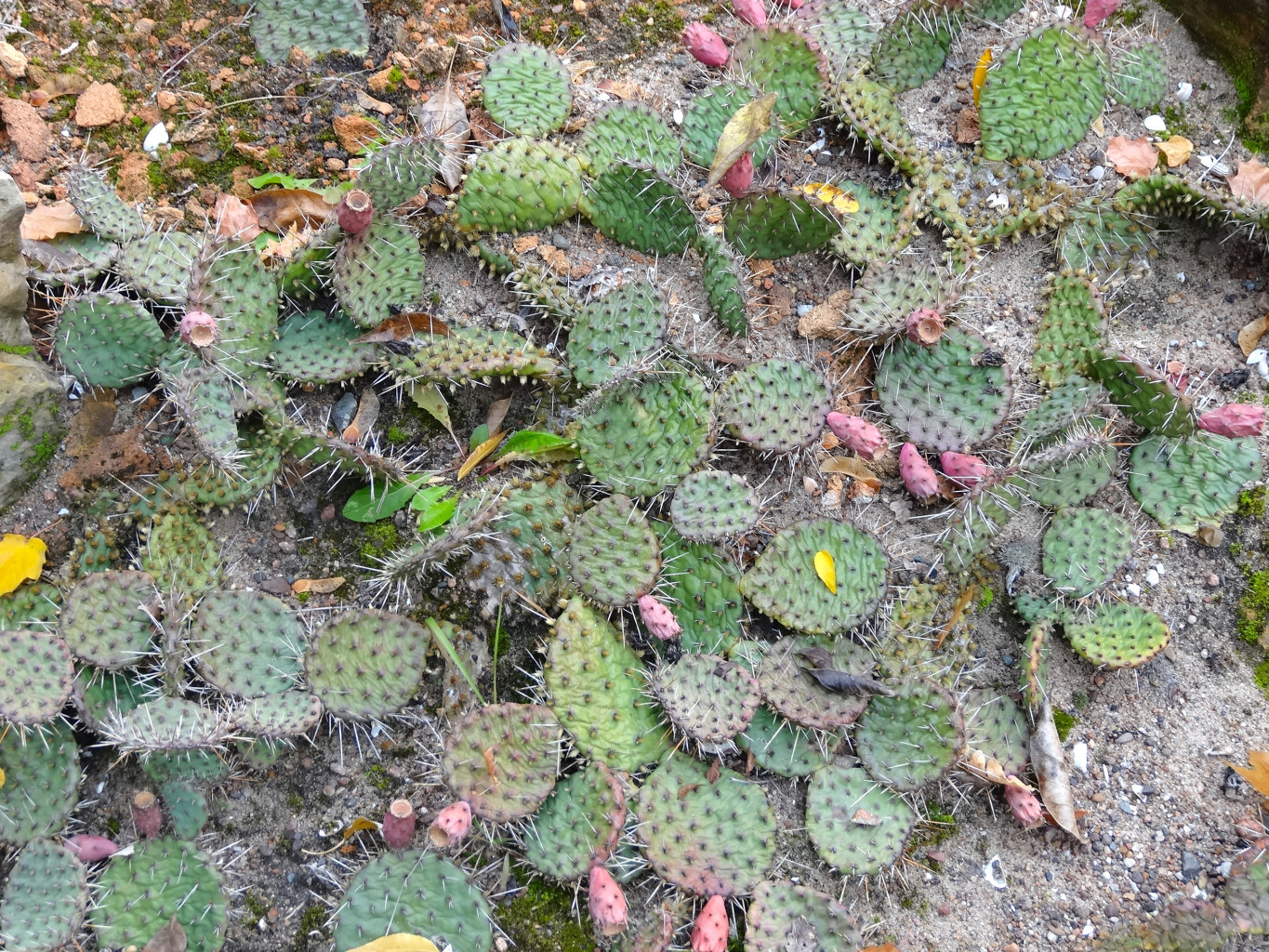
Cactus parterre

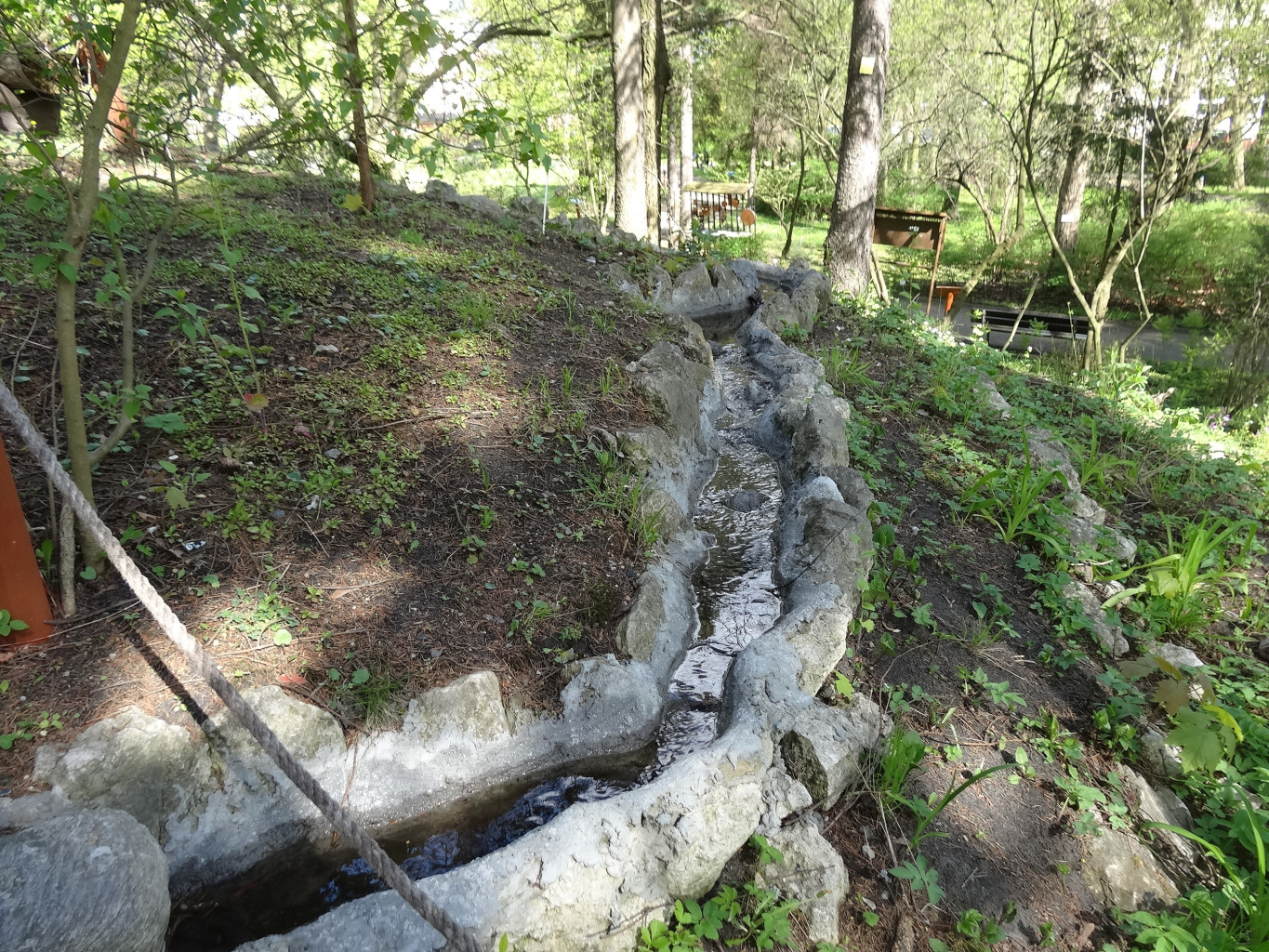
Shaped terrace

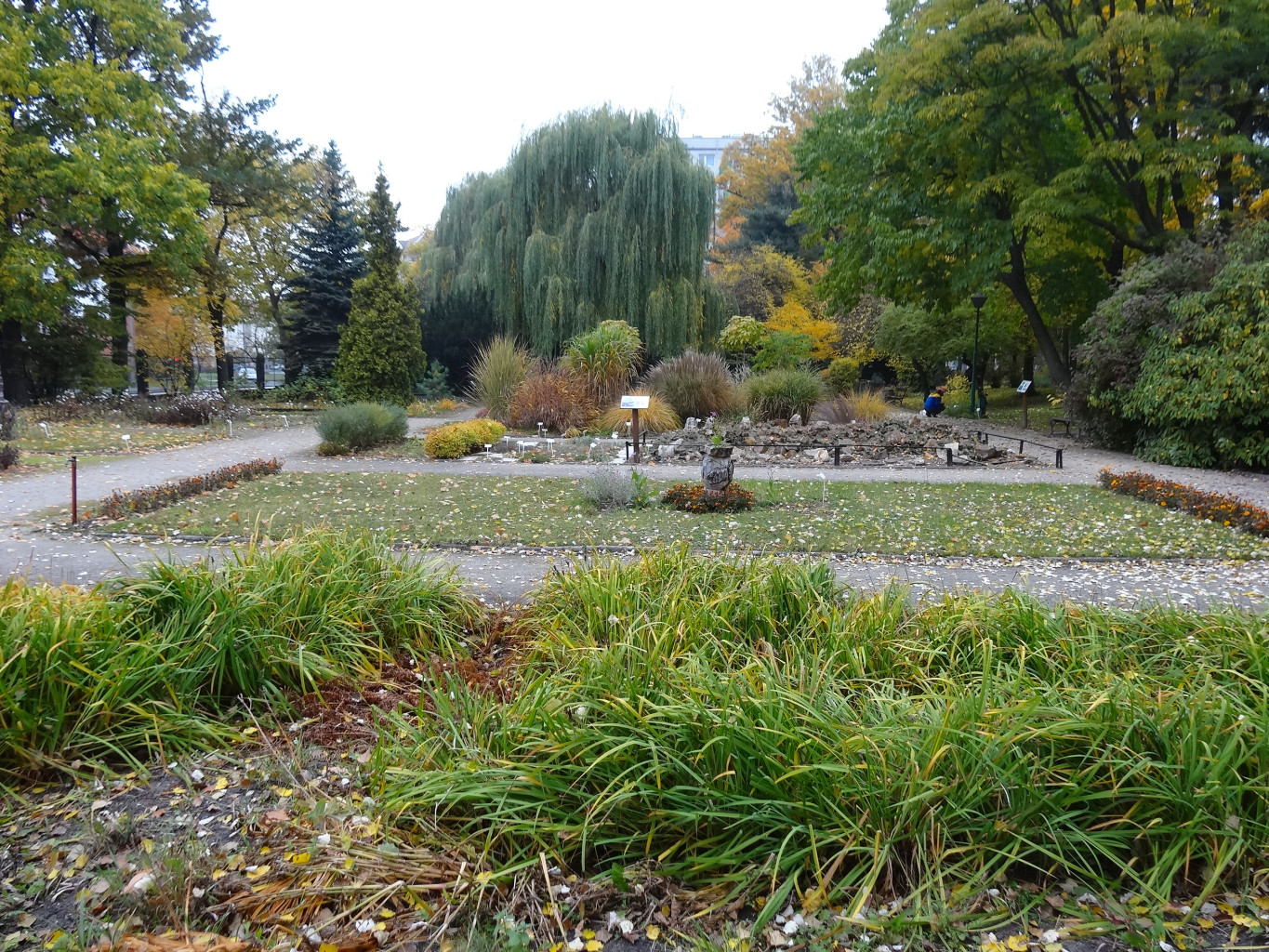
View of parterres

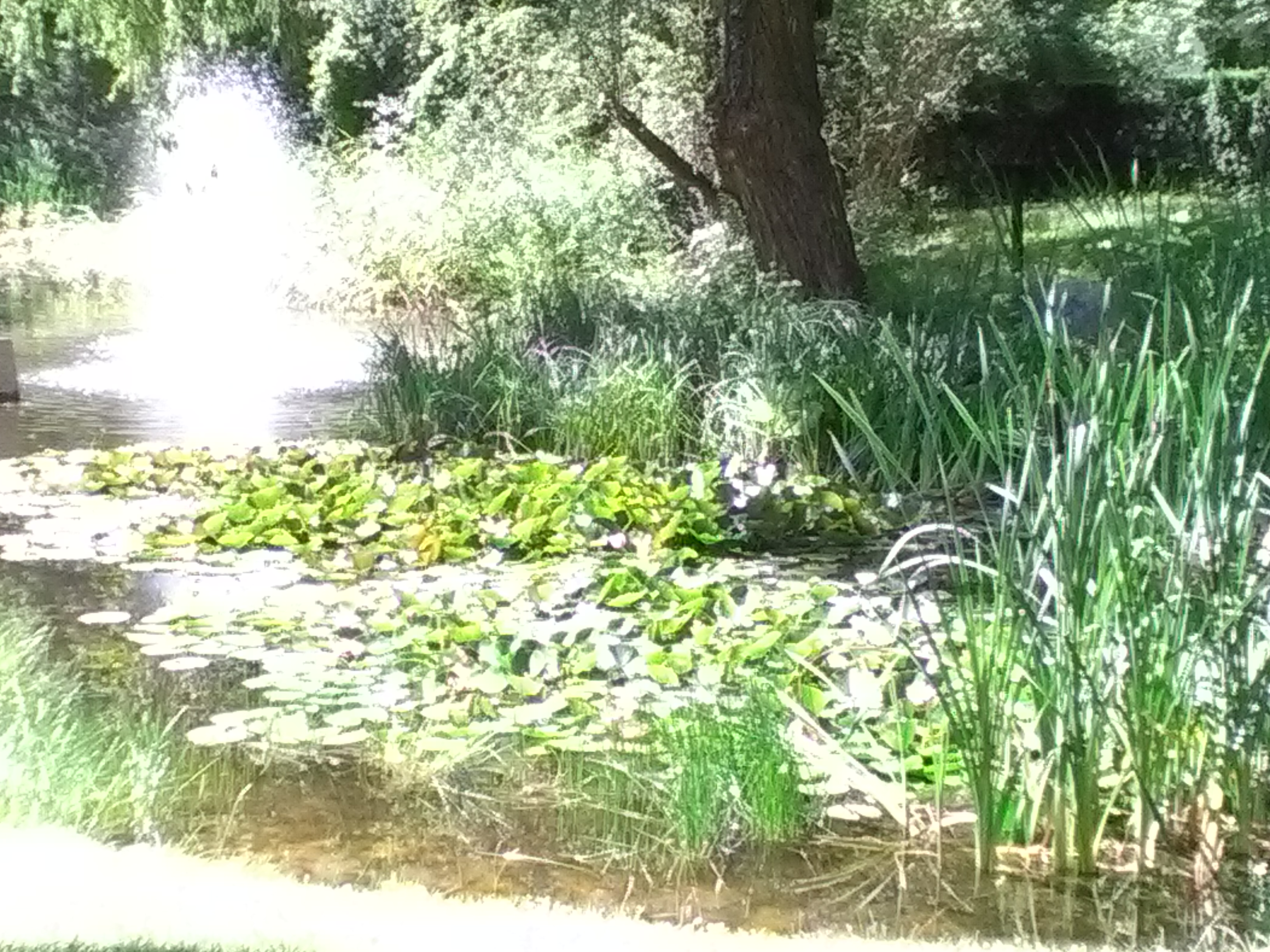
Arboretum pond

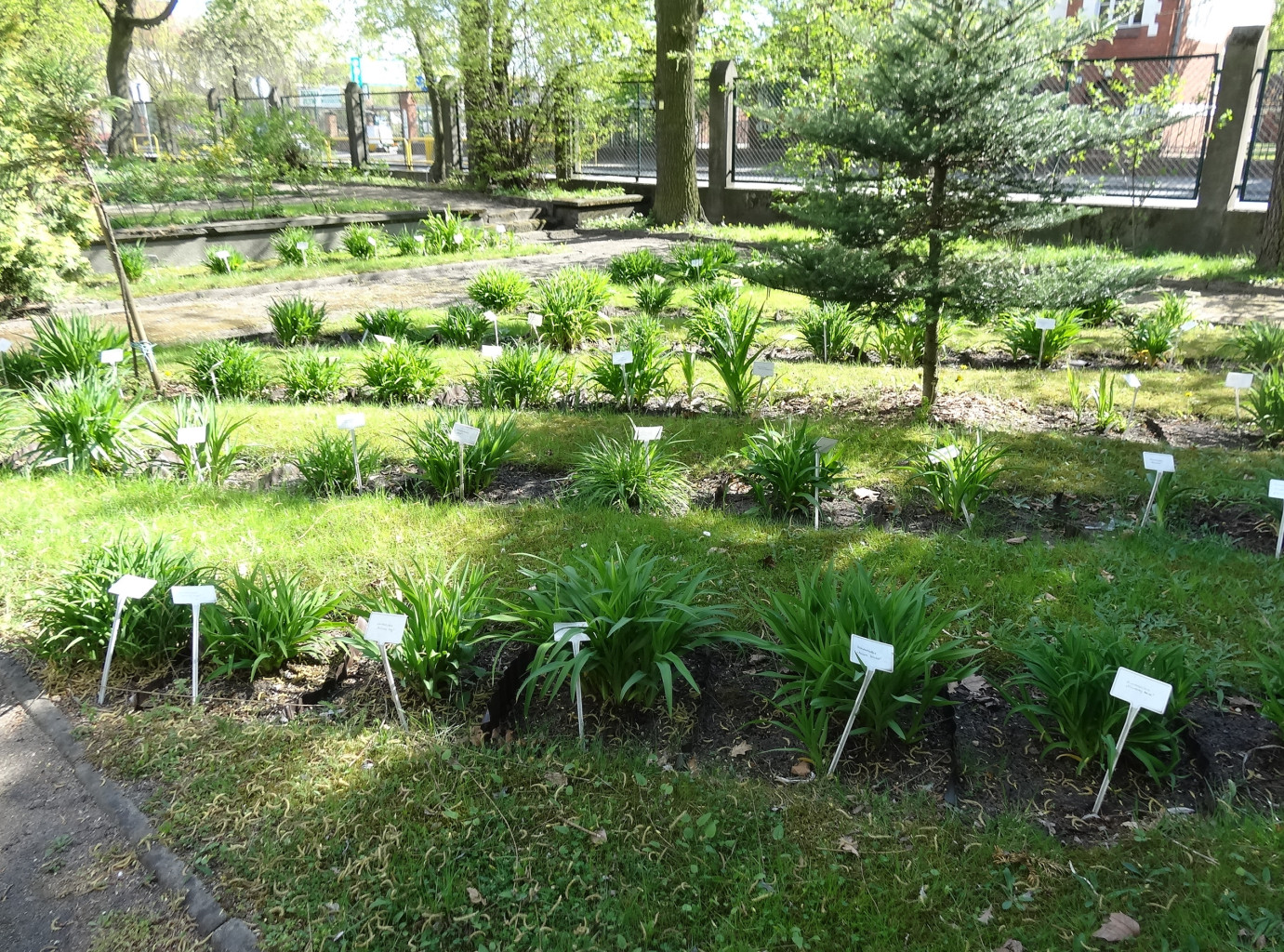
Plant area

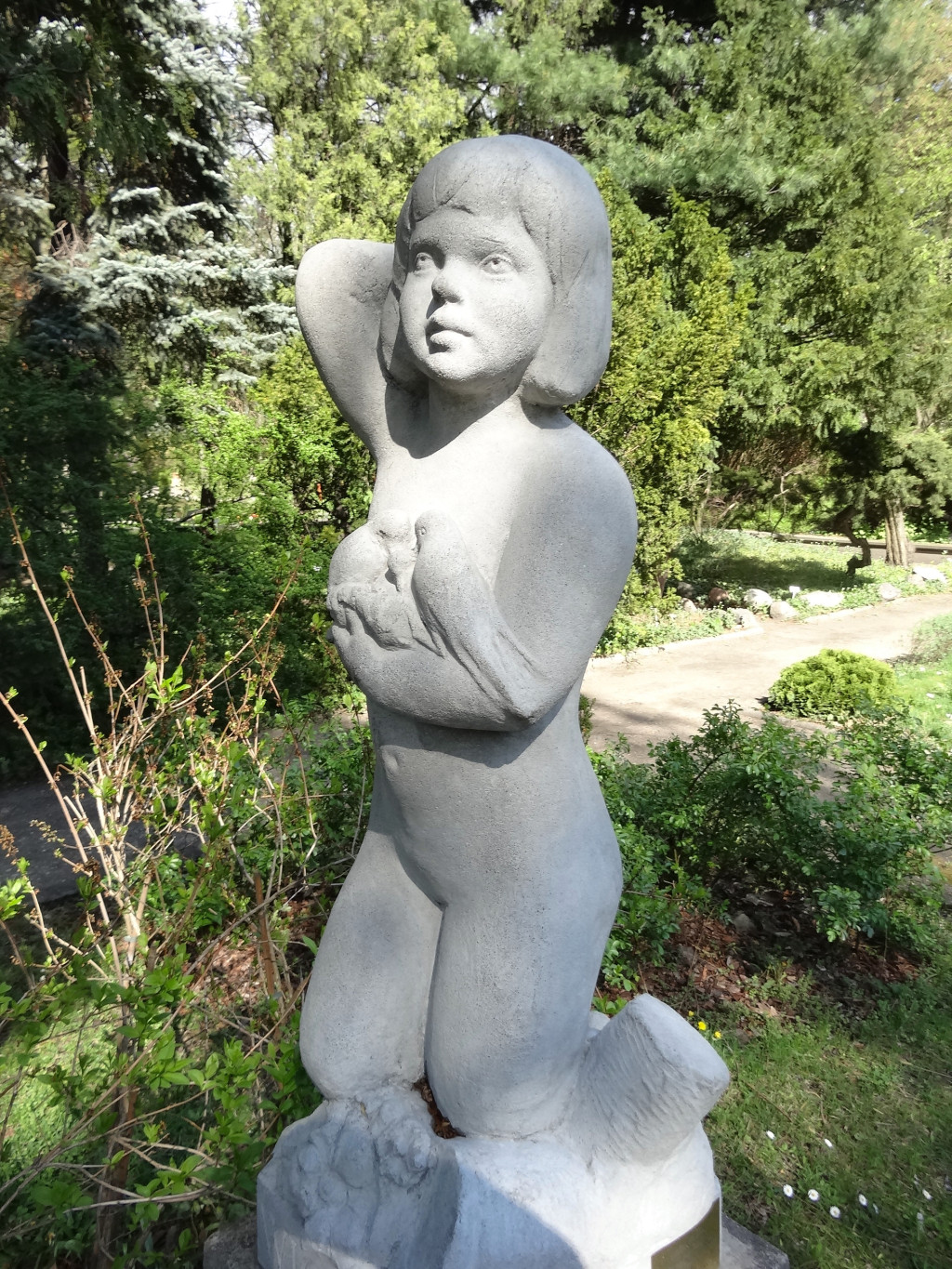
Spring allegory

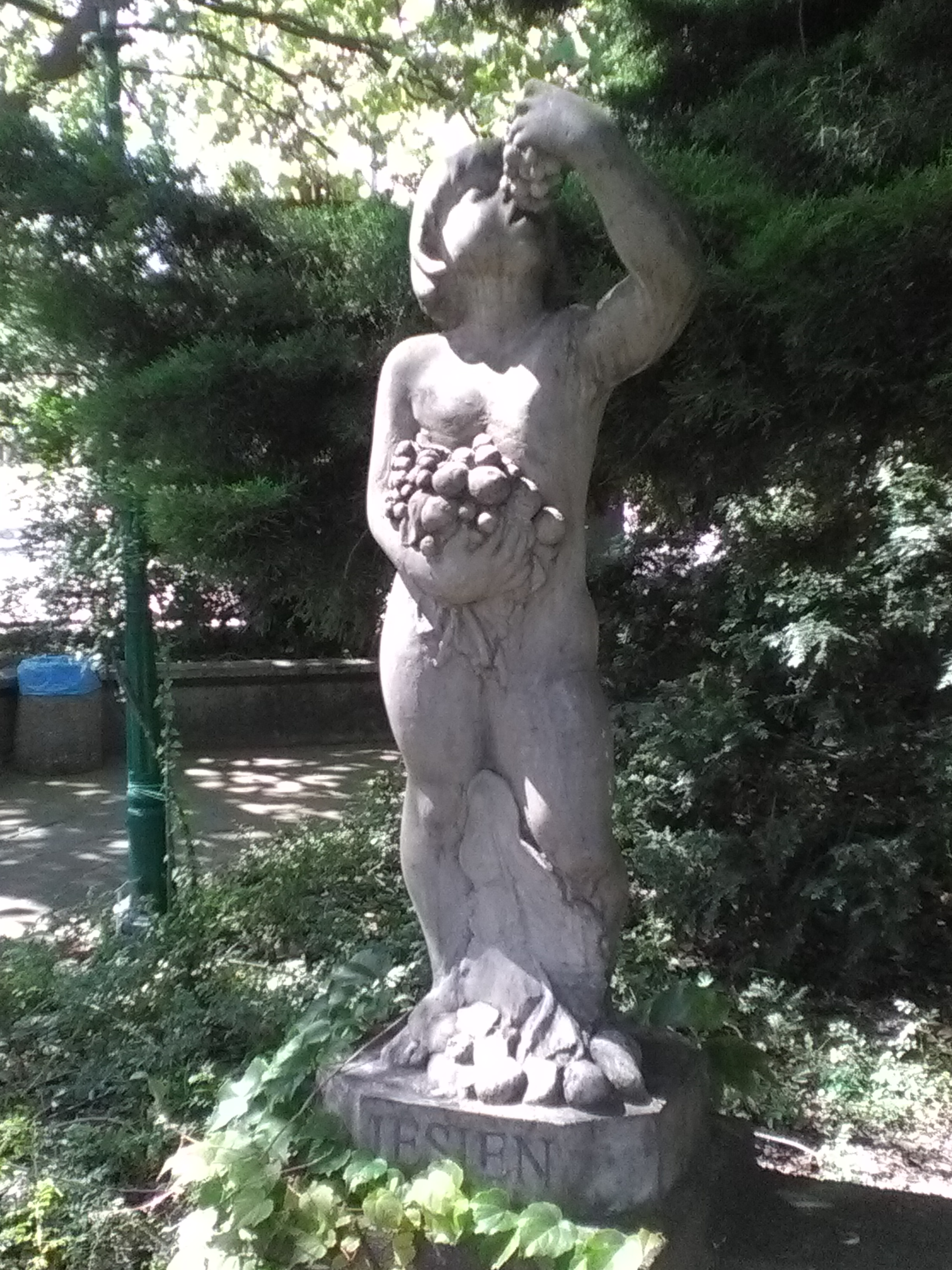
Autumn allegory

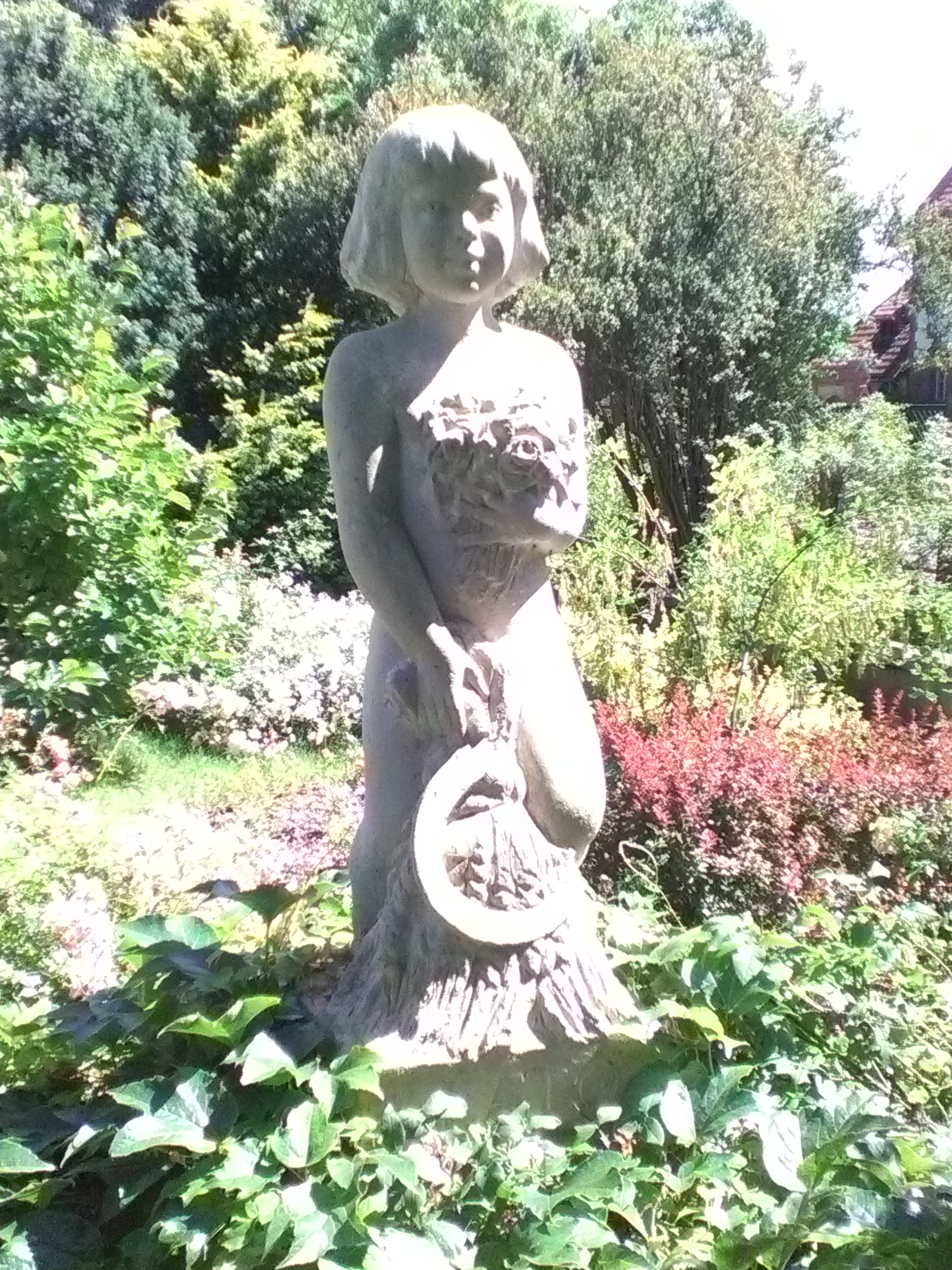
Summer allegory

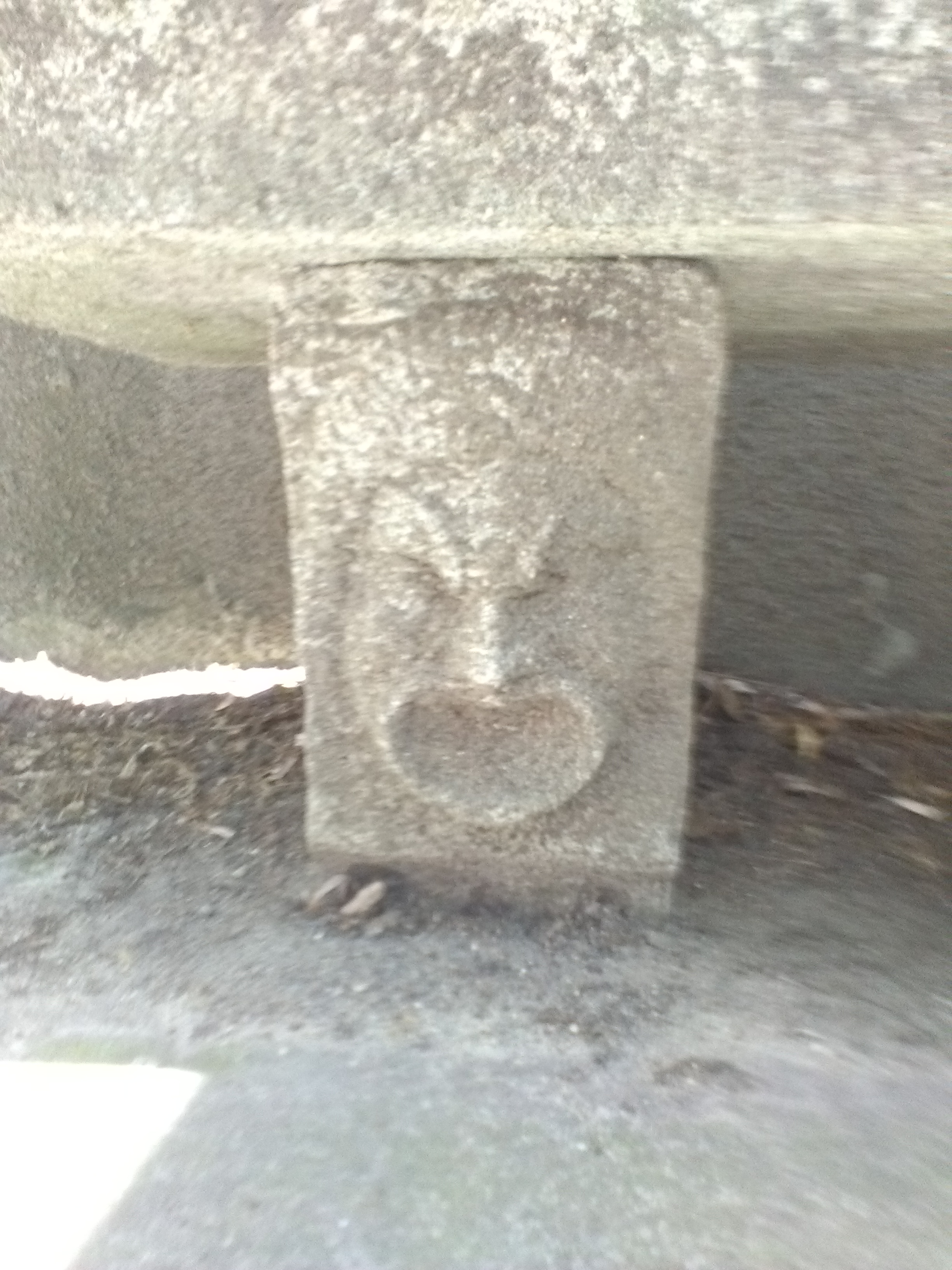
Mascaron adorning the relief

== See also ==
- Bydgoszcz
- Institutes of Agriculture of Bydgoszcz
- Stanisław Horno-Popławski
- Dendrology

== Bibliography ==
- Jastrzębski, Włodzimierz (2001). Encyklopedia Bydgoszczy. t.1 (in Polish). Bydgoszcz: Towarzystwo Miłośników Miasta Bydgoszczy. ISBN 9788392642367.
- Kaja, Renata (1996). "Arboretum" - kompleksowy pomnik przyrody Bydgoszczy. Kalendarz Bydgoski (in Polish). Bydgoszcz: Towarzystwo Miłośników Miasta Bydgoszczy.
- Kaja, Renata (1995). Bydgoskie pomniki przyrody (in Polish). Bydgoszcz: Instytut Wydawniczy „Świadectwo”. ISBN 83-85860-32-0.
