= Stanisław Horno-Popławski =

Russian-Polish sculptor (1902–1997)

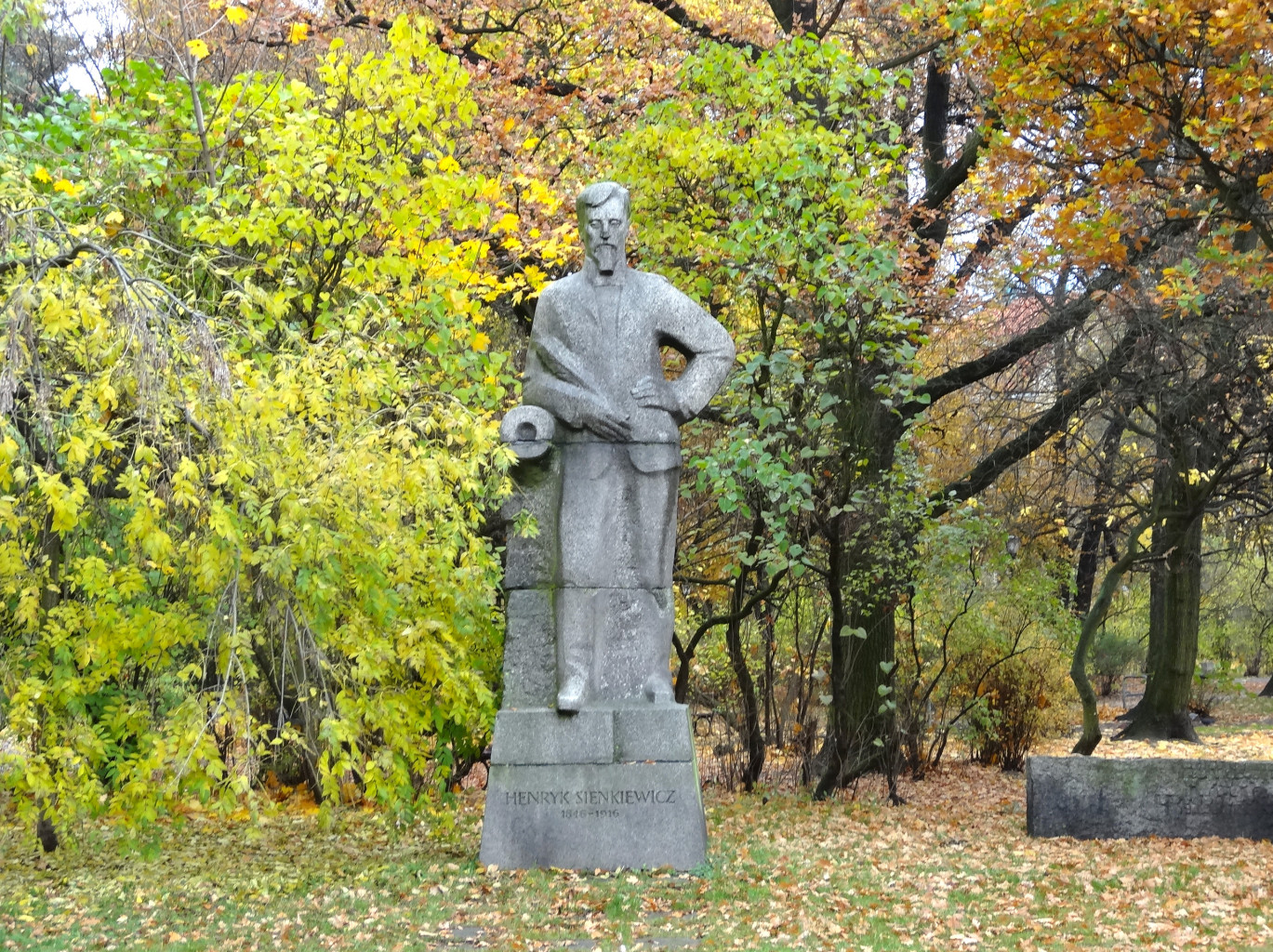
- Monument to Henryk Sienkiewicz, Bydgoszcz (1968)
- Born: July 14, 1902; Kutaisi, Georgia, Russian Empire
- Died: July 6, 1997 (aged 94); Sopot, Poland
- Resting place: Gdańsk, Poland
- Awards

Stanisław Horno-Popławski (1902-1997) was a Russian-Polish painter, sculptor and pedagogue.

== Life ==
Stanisław's mother was Maria-Natalie-Agripina Popłavskaya (Russian: Мария-Натали-Агрипина Поплавская), née Czeczott (1869-1935).

In March 1891, she married Bartłomiej Józef Popławski (1861-1931) a Russian-Polish railway engineer (1861-1931) who later became president of the Warsaw Shipping and Trade Society. Bartłomiej had just been transferred the same year to Crimea (then part of the Russian Empire), due to poor health and was involved in the construction of the Feodosia-Dzhankoy railway line (1891-1895). A year later in Feodosia, they had a daughter Maria Yadviga (1892-1930s). Stanisław was born on July 14, 1902, in Kutaisi, Georgia, then part of the Russian Empire.

In 1908, the family left Georgia for Moscow where the young Stanisław began his art studies in the late 1910s. While visiting museums and galleries in the Russian capital, he was fascinated by painting. In 1921, Stanisław lived briefly in Vilnius, but soon they transferred from Soviet Union to motherland Poland in 1922.

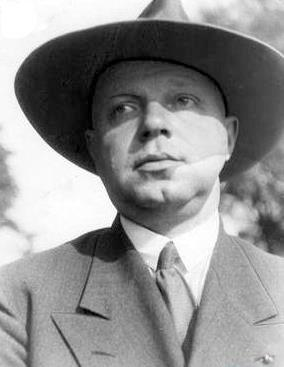
Tadeusz Pruszkowski ca 1930s

In Warsaw, he resumed his education from 1923 to 1931, at the Warsaw School of Fine Arts under the tutoring of Tadeusz Pruszkowski and Tadeusz Breyer. After graduation, he traveled to France and Italy.

In 1931, Horno-Popławski began his teaching career at the Faculty of Fine Arts of the Stephen Báthory University in Vilnius, today's part of the Vilnius University. He was a member of several associations:

- the Association of Polish Visual Artists with its periodical official publication "Forma", led by Władysław Strzemiński;
- the Vilnius Society of Plastic Artists
- the Warsaw Trade Union of Artists and Sculptors.

In 1935, her mother Maria died in Italy. She was buried in the family vault in the Powązki Cemetery in Warsaw, together with her husband, who died four years earlier.

Stanisław took part to the Second World War from its beginning in September 1939 and got captured. He spent the rest of the conflict in the POW camp for Polish officers "Oflag II-C" located in Woldenberg (today Dobiegniew, Lubusz Voivodeship). During his detention, he realized several religious statues placed in the camp chapel.

A the end of the war, once released from the POW camp, he worked for a year as a professor at the School of Fine Arts of Białystok. It is in the city that he found back his wife and his children he was separated from since 1939.

From 1946 to 1949, he was a teacher at the Faculty of Fine Arts of the Nicolaus Copernicus University in Toruń. In 1948, he received the second prize in a competition for the design of a monument to Adam Mickiewicz in Poznań.

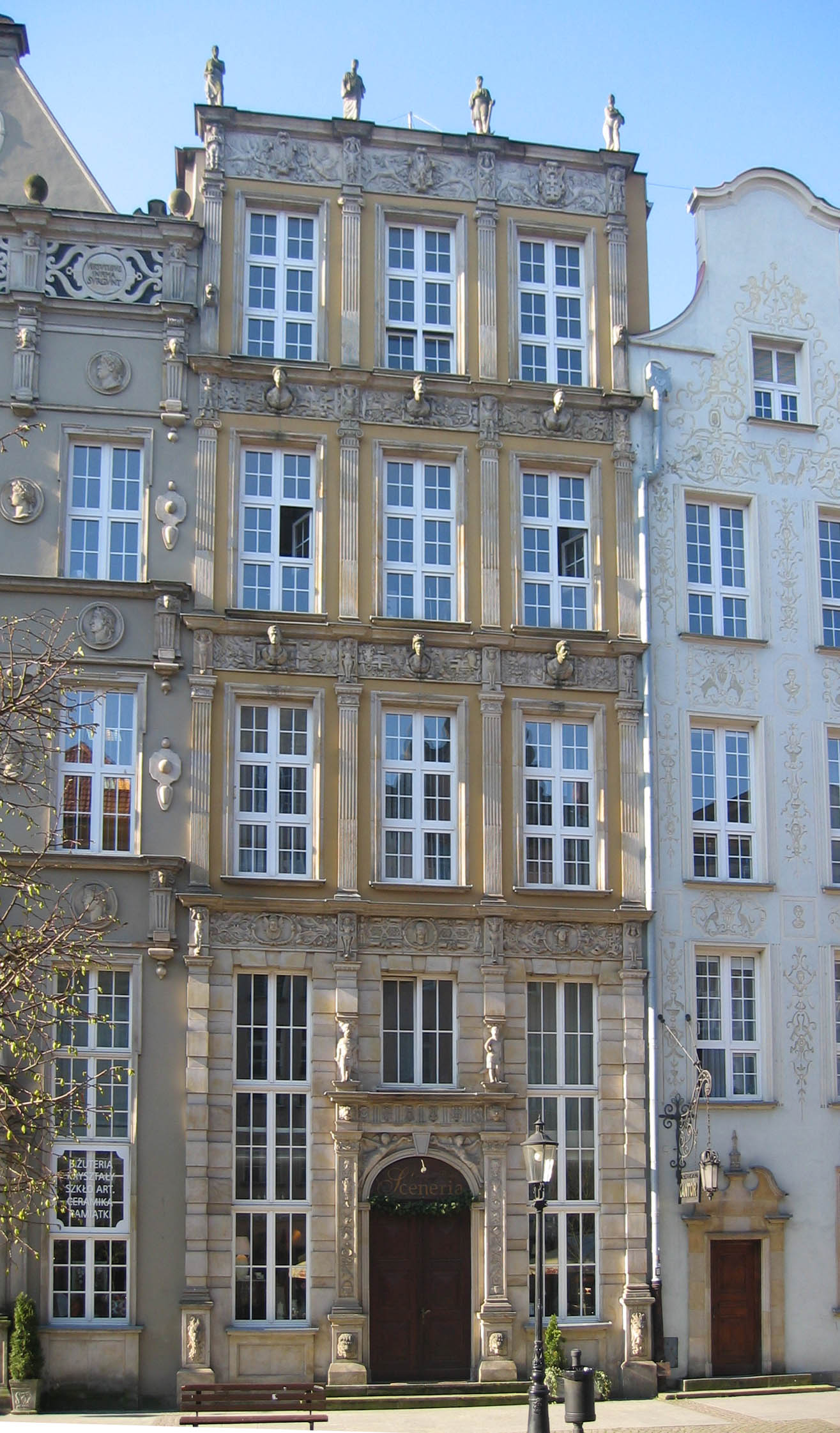
Ferber house, Gdańsk

In 1949, he moved to Sopot then Gdańsk at the Academy of Fine Arts, where he even served in the position of the Dean of the Faculty of Sculpture in 1949-1950 and in 1956–1960. Between 1951 and 1954, Stanisław was the main expert in the reconstruction project of the Old Town of Gdańsk, designing houses and sculptural decorations. He worked more particularly on:

- the Ferber House at 28 Długa street;
- the house at 38 Długa street;
- the tenement details at 43 Długi Targ square.

The artist's face can be found on the keystone of the vaulted afacade at 1 Pończoszników street.

He took part in exhibitions of National Fine Arts in Warsaw and received a number of high awards in the field of sculpture. In 1952, he took part in the soviet sponsored exhibition "100 Years of Realism in Poland" (Russian: 100 лет "реализма" в Польше) in Moscow.

As an outcome of a 1954 competition, he was granted the realization of a monument to Adam Mickiewicz placed in 1955 in the front yard of the "Palace of Culture and Science" in Warsaw.

At the end of the 1950s, inspired by archaic Greek and Etruscan sculptures, Horno-Popławski undertook new formal searches using the expression of natural shapes of "fieldstones", which gave him a high position among the 20th century sculptors.

Stanisław's works, during the post-war years, were exhibited in Poland, in Europe (Paris (1961), Berlin (1971), Bucharest (1972), Oslo and Essen (1974)), as well as in Asia (New Delhi, Kolkata, Bombay, Beijing). He won recognition for his merits in favour of the Polish Culture (1962, 1965, 1995) and was even awarded a gold medal at the "Contemporary Art Biennale" in Florence in 1969. He made two trips to his Georgian roots (1967, 1978), where two of his works are displayed (Kutaisi State Historical Museum and Niko Pirosmani Museum in Tbilisi).

From 1979 to 1983, thanks to Marian Turwid's suggestion, the sculptor moved to a small house in the botanical garden of Bydgoszcz, looking for a city "whose character guarantees the possibility of quiet creative work, and whose atmosphere is devoid of nervous hustle and bustle, which absorbs and disturbs focused actions". On July 22 of this year, then the official holiday in the Polish People's Republic, Horno-Popławski opened in the city garden an open-air gallery of his compositions, which he donated. The collection included the following works: "Partisan", "Memories of Bagrati", "Morena", "Copernicus", "Tadeusz Breyer", "Tehura", "Gruzinka", "Waiting", "Szota Rustawelli", "Colchida", "Żal", "Pogodna", "Beethoven" and "Hair". Unfortunately, most of these works have been stolen.

After this spell in Bydgoszcz, Stanisław moved back to Sopot where he had his atelier set up near the Grand Hotel.

Hi was married to P. Inga Stanisława, a sculptor as well. They had several children, among whom a daughter, P. Jolanta Ronczewska who married in 1960 Polish actor Ryszard Ronczewski.

Stanisław Horno-Popławski died on June 6, 1997, in Sopot.

== Family ==
=== Popławski branch ===
- Bartłomiej Józef Popławski (Russian: Варфоломей-Иосиф Иванович Поплавский), Stanisław's father, was born in 1861 in Chita,: his grandfather, a Polish noble, had been exiled to a hard labor settlement in Siberia for having participated in January Uprising. Graduated in 1887 as an engineer from the St. Petersburg State Transport University, he worked for ten years on the construction of many railway lines in Russian Siberia (Trans-Siberian Railway, Chinese-Eastern Railway). He was then posted until 1914 as the manager of the "Society of Warsaw Access Railways" and "Director of the Warsaw Society of Shipping and Trade"; as such, he directed the construction of the narrow-gauge railway from "Warszawa Most" to Jabłonna II (1898). At the end of WWI, he returned to Warsaw with his family. He died there on July 4, 1931.
- Stanisław's grandfather, Ivan Varfolomeevich Popławski (1822-1893) (Russian: Иван Варфоломеевич Поплавский), was the vice-governor of the Transbaikal region, a member of the Irkutsk City Duma. He died on October 31, 1893, in St. Petersburg.
- Stanisław's grandmother, Yadviga Iosifovna Poplavskaya (Russian: Ядвига Иосифовна Поплавская), née Ventskovskaya (Russian: Венцковская) (1837-1924), was a Polish noblewoman, owner of a tea plantation in Gudauta, Georgia, and of a match factory, "Sun" ("Солнце") in Chudovo, Novgorod province. Together with Ivan, they had 7 children.

Stanisław's uncles were:

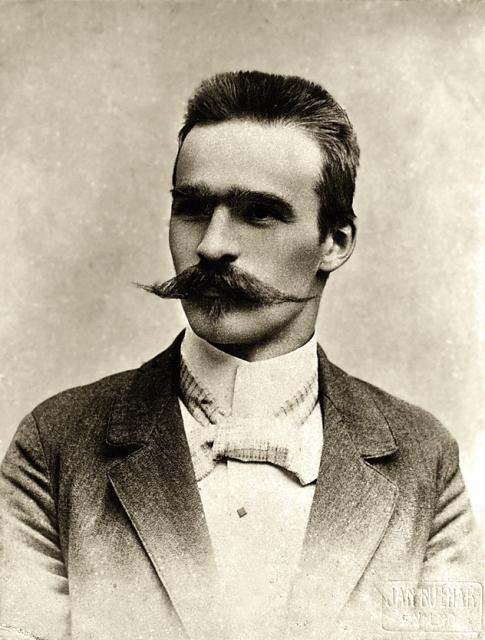
Piłsudski c. 1899

- Jan Popławski (Russian: Иван Иванович Поплавский) (1859–1935), a doctor of medical sciences in internal and nervous diseases. In 1900, he was the head of the medical unit for the mentally ill at the "Saint Nicholas hospital" together with the chief physician Otton Czeczott.

During 5 months they hid Józef Piłsudski (1867–1935) feigning mental illness, who has been sent for a medical examination after his arrest in Łódź. Using their official positions, Jan, together with other physicians (Władysław Mazurkiewicz, Aleksander Sulkiewicz and others) helped Piłsudski to escape to Galicia. After this action, Popławski had to leave his post: he then took up a private practice as a physician. Jan enlarged successfully the art collection started by his father. His gathering was focused on Dutch and Flemish painting and the Italian Quattrocento. In 1924, at the personal invitation of Józef Piłsudski, Jan left Leningrad at the age of 65 for Warsaw to attend his seriously ill brother Bartholomew-Joseph, and stayed there. Popławski's collection is today the pride of the National Museum in Warsaw, including, among others, works from Rubens, Van Dyck, Rembrandt, Tintoretto, Jordaens or Jan Steen. Widowed in 1933, Jan moved to a rented apartment at 16 Chłodna street in Warsaw, where his private medical practice received a large high-ranking clientele, in particular Józef Piłsudski. He died in his flat in 1935.

- Iosif Ivanovich Popławski (1865–1943), a lawyer, legal representative of the Board of the Joint Stock Company of the Chinese Eastern Railway and director of the family match factory "Солнце" in Chudovo. He died in 1943 in USSR.

=== Czeczott branch ===
- Stanisław's mother, Maria-Natalie-Agripina Popłavskaya (Russian: Мария-Натали-Агрипина Поплавская), was the daughter of Otton Czeczott (Russian: Оттон Чечотт), a famous Russian-Polish psychiatrist, professor at Saint Petersburg's Psychoneurological Institute. Maria was an artist and a sculptor. In her youth, she took painting lessons from Ivan Aivazovsky one of the greatest master painters of marine art.

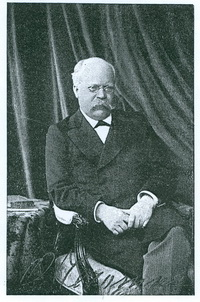
Otton Czeczott in 1906

- Stanisław's grandfather was the psychiatrist Otton Dionizy Antoni Czeczott (Russian: Оттон Антонович Чечотт (1842-1924). Coming from a noble family of Mogilev, Russian Empire (today's Belarus), he graduated from the "Imperial Medical-Surgical Academy" of Saint-Petersburg in 1866. From 1881 to 1901, he was a senior and then chief doctor of the "Saint Nicholas hospital". He left his position after Józef Piłsudski's escaping from his institution. In 1922, adopting Polish citizenship, he emigrated with his family to Poland. He died on October 8, 1924, and was buried in the Powązki Cemetery in Warsaw.

Stanisław's uncles were:

- Henryk Czeczott (Russian: Генрих Оттонович Чечотт) (1875–1928), an engineer graduated from the Saint Petersburg Mining University in 1900. In 1914, he was sent to the US to study the senior course of the enrichment department of the Massachusetts Institute of Technology under the lead of Robert Hallowell Richards. He set up a gold mine in the Altai Mountains and managed it until the nationalization in 1918. On his initiative, Russia's first department of mineral processing was established at the Mining Institute, which after October Revolution, was transformed into the "Institute of Mechanical Processing of Mineral Resources" (Russian: Механобр) under his direction. In 1922, he moved to Poland, where he became a professor at the Krakow Mining Academy. In 1928, during a scientific trip to Germany and Spain, he died on June 6, 1928, in Freiberg from blood poisoning. His body was transported back to Poland and buried at the Evangelical Cemetery in Warsaw.
- Albert Czeczott (Russian: Альберт Оттонович Чечотт) (1873–1955), graduated in 1897, from the "Saint Petersburg Institute of Railway Engineers", where in 1914, he became a professor. After the October Revolution and the following Civil War, he emigrated in 1922, to live in Poland. From 1927 onwards, he taught at the Warsaw Polytechnic Institute and in 1928 he worked also at the Polish Ministry of Railways. In 1933, he supervised the construction of a measuring laboratory in Romania for the study of locomotives. From 1934 to 1937, he worked in Tehran at the construction of the Trans-Iranian Railway. During the German occupation, he was engaged in theoretical work at home. Soon after the liberation of Warsaw by Soviet troops, on February 6, 1945, he resumed his work at the Ministry. In 1951, he moved to the newly created Railway Institute, where he organized a laboratory on flue gas and steam traction. He died on November 3, 1955, in Warsaw.

== Recognition ==
Initially, Horno-Popławski's works were following realistic convention. In the last years of his life, he progressively drifted away from the classical line towards compositions realized from slightly worked rough stones. He was going to his studio every day, it was like his factory work. In this way, he did not have to wait for a sudden surge of creative energy. His works are now scattered in many Polish cities.

Popławski's works keep to draw attention. In April 2005, an exhibition was held in the "Exhibition Hall" of Moscow titled "Stanislav Horno-Popławski. The road of art - the art of the road." The display included more than 50 sculptures of the artist loaned from Polish museums, among which the National Museums of Warsaw, Kraków, Poznań, Szczecin or Gdańsk. The exhibit covered works from the 1950s to the 1970s, up to the last ones created in the 1980s-1990s, in particular pieces from his cycle "The Dream of a Stone" (Polish: Sen Kamienia).

This cycle is rated as "oneiric, intuitively archetypal, symbolic" representing "metacultural female heads, which he developed until the last days of his life.", as expressed by dr. Dorota Grubba-Thiede, from the Academy of Fine Art Gdańsk, during a lecture performed for the Art Centre of Bydgoszcz (Polish: Bydgoskie Centrum Sztuki) on June 6, 2020.

Dr. Dorota Grubba-Thiede had the honor to meet the artist in Sopot in 1997. From this conversation stemmed an album-monograph edited by prof. Jerzy Malinowski with the cooperation of the sculptor's family, entitled Stanisław Horno-Popławski (1902-1997) - The Way of Art - The Art of the Way, published in 2002 by the State Art Gallery of Sopot.

On July 22, 1952, by decision of the President of the Republic of Poland, the artist was awarded was awarded the Golden Cross of Merit (Polish: Złoty Krzyż Zasługi) for his works in the field of culture and art.

In 1953 he was awarded the State Award Badge, 2nd echelon.

In 1996, Horno-Popławski was promoted doctor honoris causa of the University in Toruń, UMK of Toruń.

On April 25, 1997, Horno-Popławski was awarded the title of doctor honoris causa from the Academy of Fine Arts in Gdańsk.

In 2004, the Sopot exhibition „Stanisław Horno-Popławski. Droga sztuki- sztuka drogi” traveled to Lviv and Odessa.

Commemorative plaques to his memory have been unveiled in 2005 (Gdańsk) and 2011 (Sopot).

In 2017, the newly open Bydgoszcz Art Centre (Polish: Bydgoskie Centrum Sztuki) has taken as patron name "Horno-Popławski". The gallery at 47 Jagiellońska street has organized an exhibition on the artist in February–March 2020.

== Notable works ==
His works can be seen in many museums in Poland and around the world (e.g. Kraków, Poznań, Bydgoszcz, Berlin, Moscow, Tbilisi). Furthermore, many other works are in the hands of private collectors in Norway, Canada, Israel or Japan.

- Portrait of Antosię from Kalin (1928)

One of the first piece of art realized by Horno-Popławski. It was last seen in an exhibition at the Branicki Palace of Białystok after WWII.

- Hadasa, Tehura (1930s, 1960s)

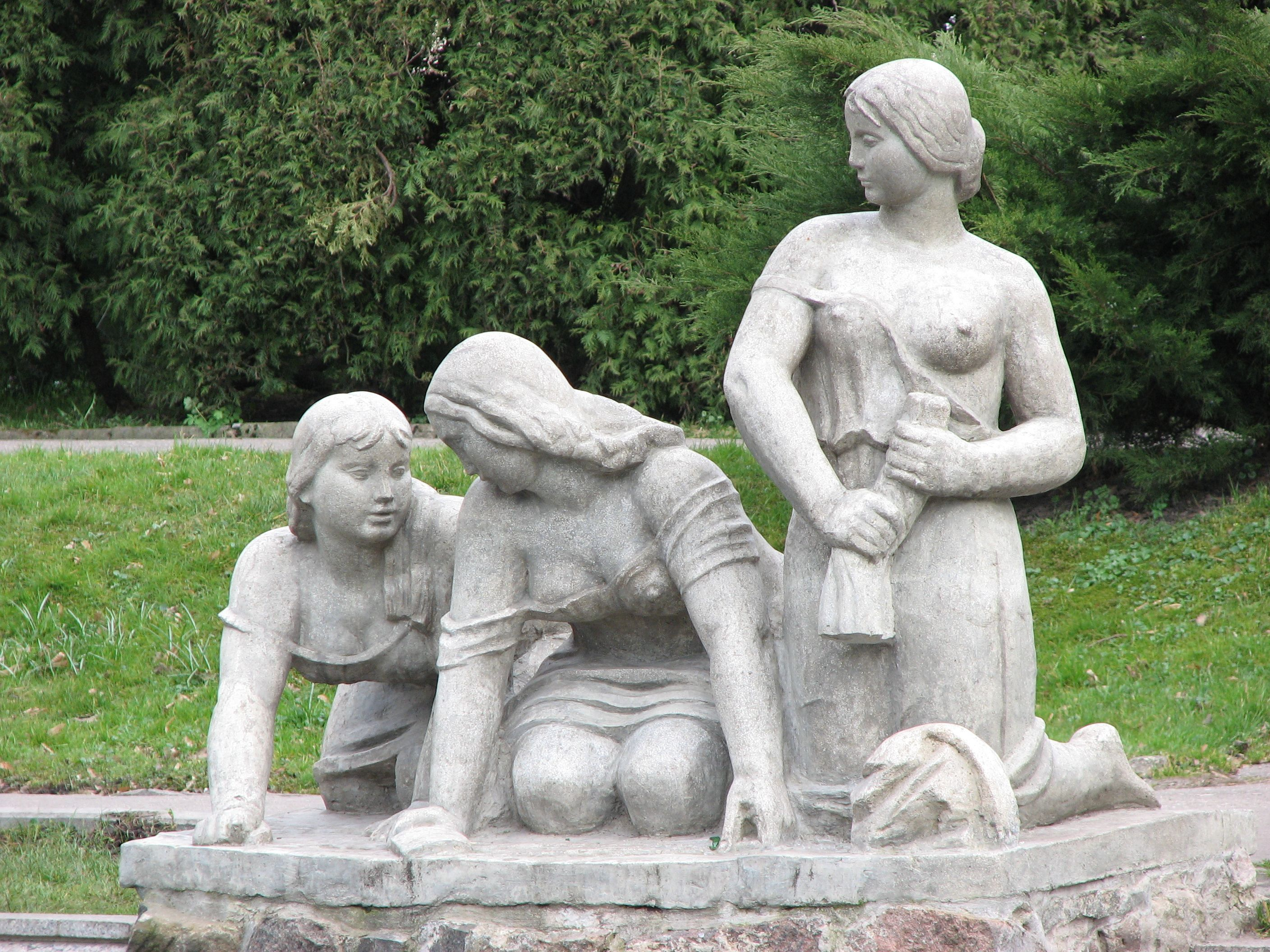
Washerwomen, Bialystok

- Biała głowa ("White head") (1980)
- Monument to bishop Władysław Bandurski in the cathedral crypt of Vilnius (1938)
- Altar statues at the Church of Jesus the Redeemer, Vilnius in Antakalnis, near Vilnius (1933-1934)
- Sculpture ensemble Praczki ("Washerwomen") in Białystok (1938)

The work was created in Toruń in 1938, commissioned by the then Białystok Voivodeship: it is the only profane work of Stanisław Horno-Popławski in the city. In 1945, it was placed over one of the ponds of the "Planty Park".

In 1978, the monument was restored, cleaned and patched with cement. In 1992, the sculpture was placed in the "Voivodeship Heritage list of Monuments". In 2000, the head of one of the statue was broken and quickly repaired. In March 2003, the monument was devastated again: one of the three figures was halved. In July 2003, the sculpture was restored anew. A scale reproduction of "Praczki" is present in one of Gdańsk museums.

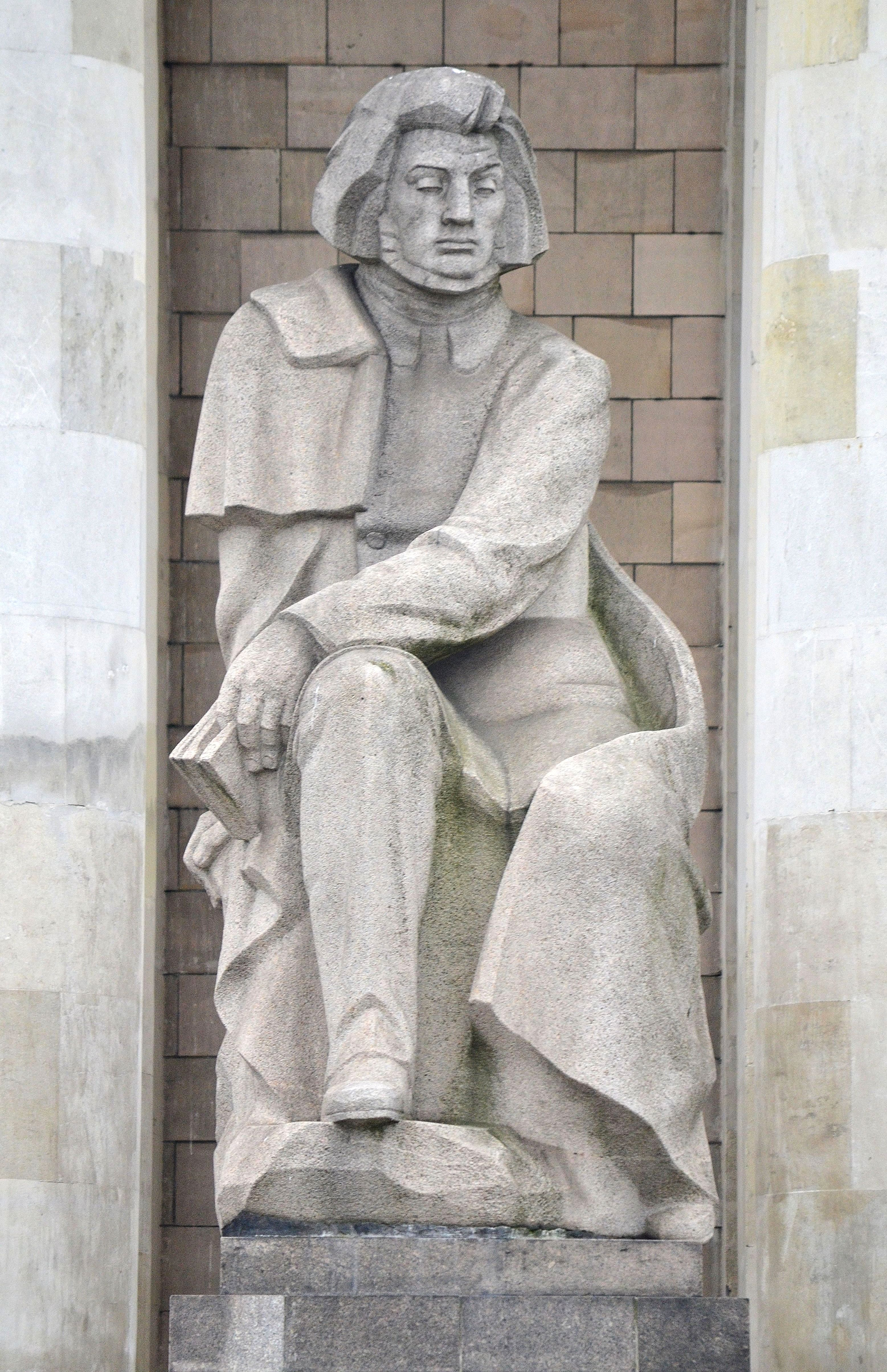
Monument to Adam Mickiewicz in front of the Palace of Culture and Science in Warsaw

- Statues at St. Roch's Church in Białystok (late 1940s)

Christ at the main altar, Mother of God with Child at the side altar and Christ the Good Shepherd outside the church.

- Monument to Adam Mickiewicz in front of the Palace of Culture and Science in Warsaw (1955)
- "Kutno" (1967)
- "Maria Konopnicka na ławce" (1968)
- Monument to Henryk Sienkiewicz in Bydgoszcz (1968)

The original monument dates back to 1927, the first elevated to Sienkiewicz in Poland. It was funded via a Committee composed of teachers and cultural activists of Bydgoszcz, led by Witold Bełza. The initial statue was made out of bronze by the artist Konstanty Laszczka. The official unveiling happened on July 31, 1927, by the President of Poland, Ignacy Mościcki. The statue was destroyed by the Nazis in the first days of the occupation, in September 1939.

The new monument, made of granite by Horno-Popławski is located on the very site of its predecessor, in today's Jan Kochanowski Park. The unveiling ceremony took place on May 18, 1968.

- Monument to Maria Konopnicka in Kalisz (1969)
- Monument to Karol Szymanowski in Słupsk (1972)
- Monument to Jan Kiliński in Słupsk (1973)

The statue of Jan Kiliński was funded by the "Słupsk Craftsmanship association". The monument is made of stone and represents one of the leaders of the Kościuszko Uprising on a pedestal, by the riverside boulevard over the Słupia River, in the vicinity of the local seat of the Craft Guild.

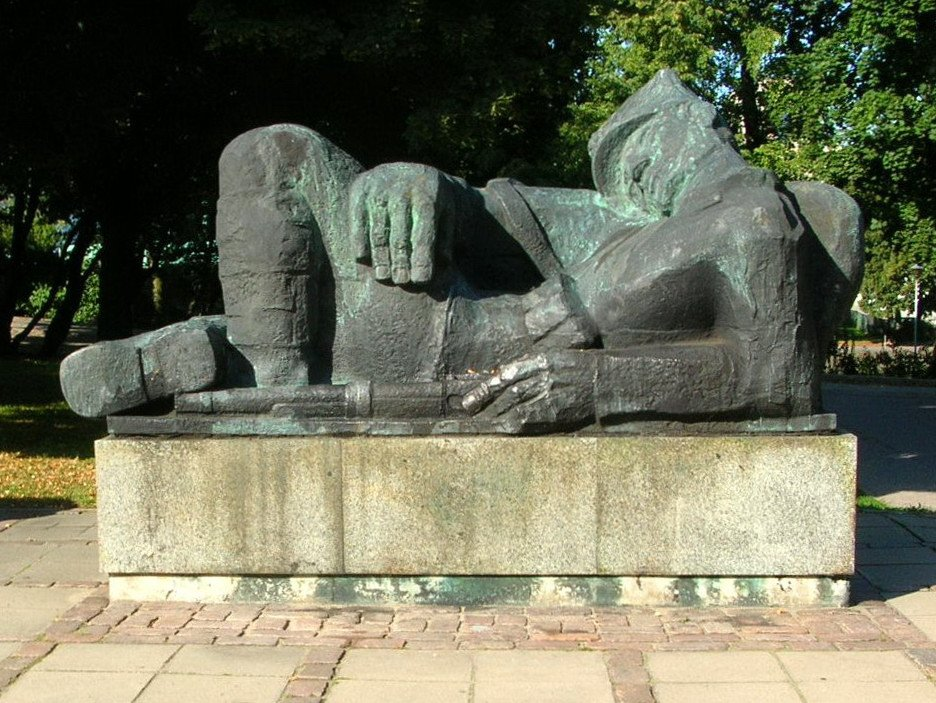
Monument to the Unknown Polish Insurgent

- Monument to Julian Marchlewski in Włocławek 1964)

Julian Marchlewski was born in Włocławek in 1866. The unveiling of Horno-Popławski's monument occurred on May 1, 1964, with the participation of Zofia, Marchlewski's daughter. Built of granite, the five-meter-high monument was in the socialist realist style. On the pedestal was an inscription "To Julian Marchlewski, the Great Internationale Patriot, Society of Włocławek and Bydgoszcz. May 1, 1964".

On January 26, 1990, as part of the decommunization, the statue was dismantled and moved to the nearby Bojańczyk brewery. On June 9, 1999, the figure without its pedestal was transferred to the Zamoyski Palace in Kozłówka and joined the Art Gallery of Socialism. The inscription plaque is still in the storage of the Włocławek Museum of the Kujawy and Dobrzyń lands (Polish: Muzeum Ziemi Kujawskiej i Dobrzyńskiej we Włocławku).

- Design of the monument to the Unknown Greater Poland Insurgent in Bydgoszcz (1986)

Unveiled on December 29, 1986, on the 68th anniversary of the Greater Poland Uprising, it is set up at the very place where originally stood the tomb containing the ashes of an unknown insurgent who died in June 1919. It was razed during WWII. The current monument, based on a design by Horno-Popławski, has been realized and cast by Aleksander Dętkoś, one of his student from Bydgoszcz.

== Gallery ==
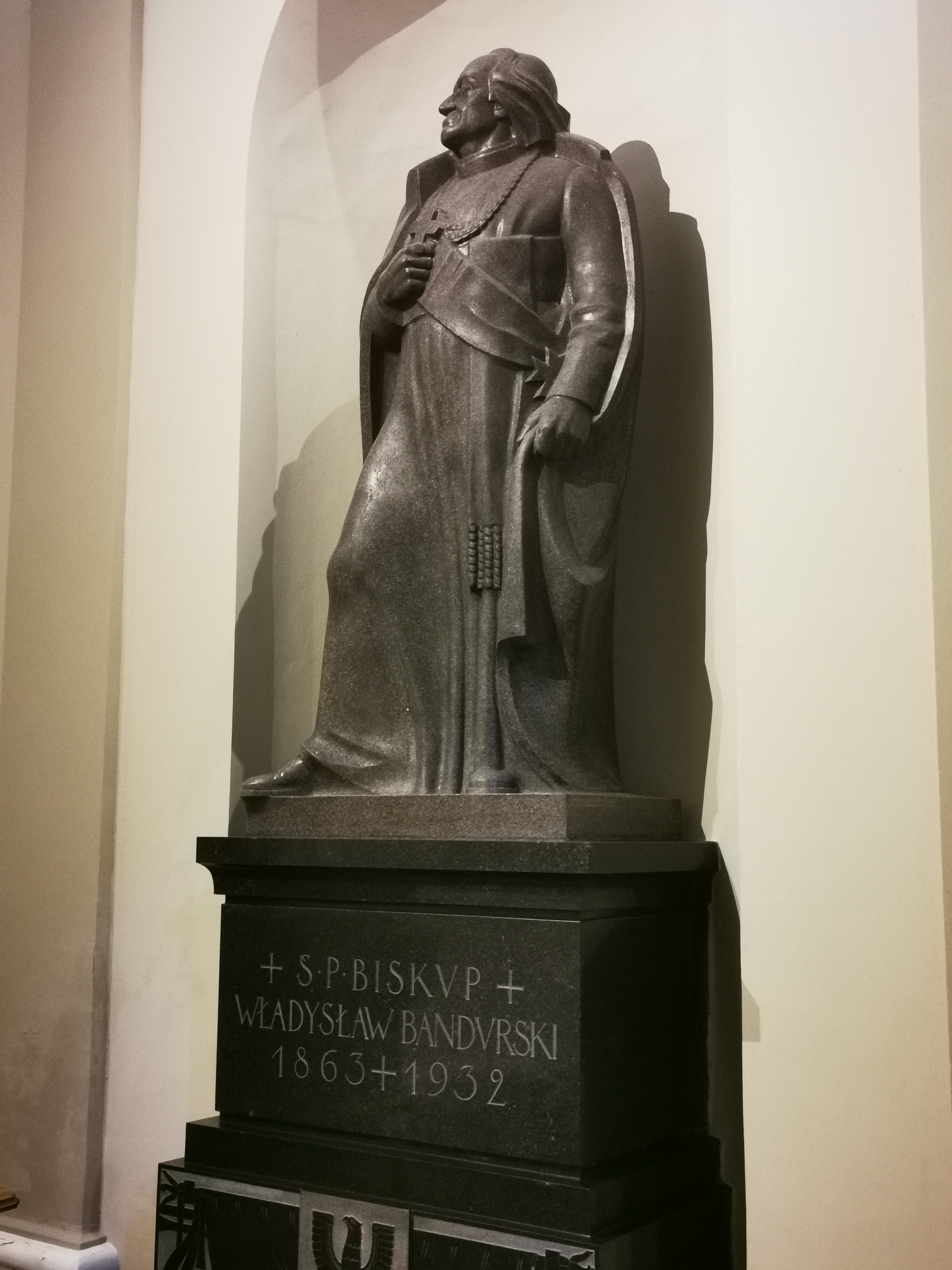
Monument to bishop Władysław Bandurski in the Vilnius Cathedral crypt (1938)

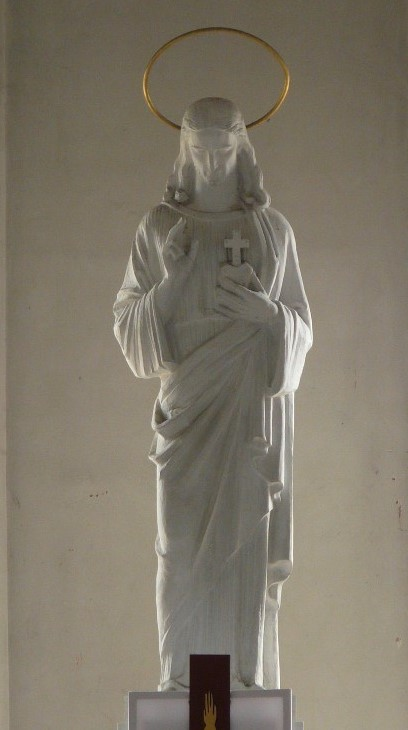
Christ, main altar, St. Roch's Church, Białystok (late 1940s)

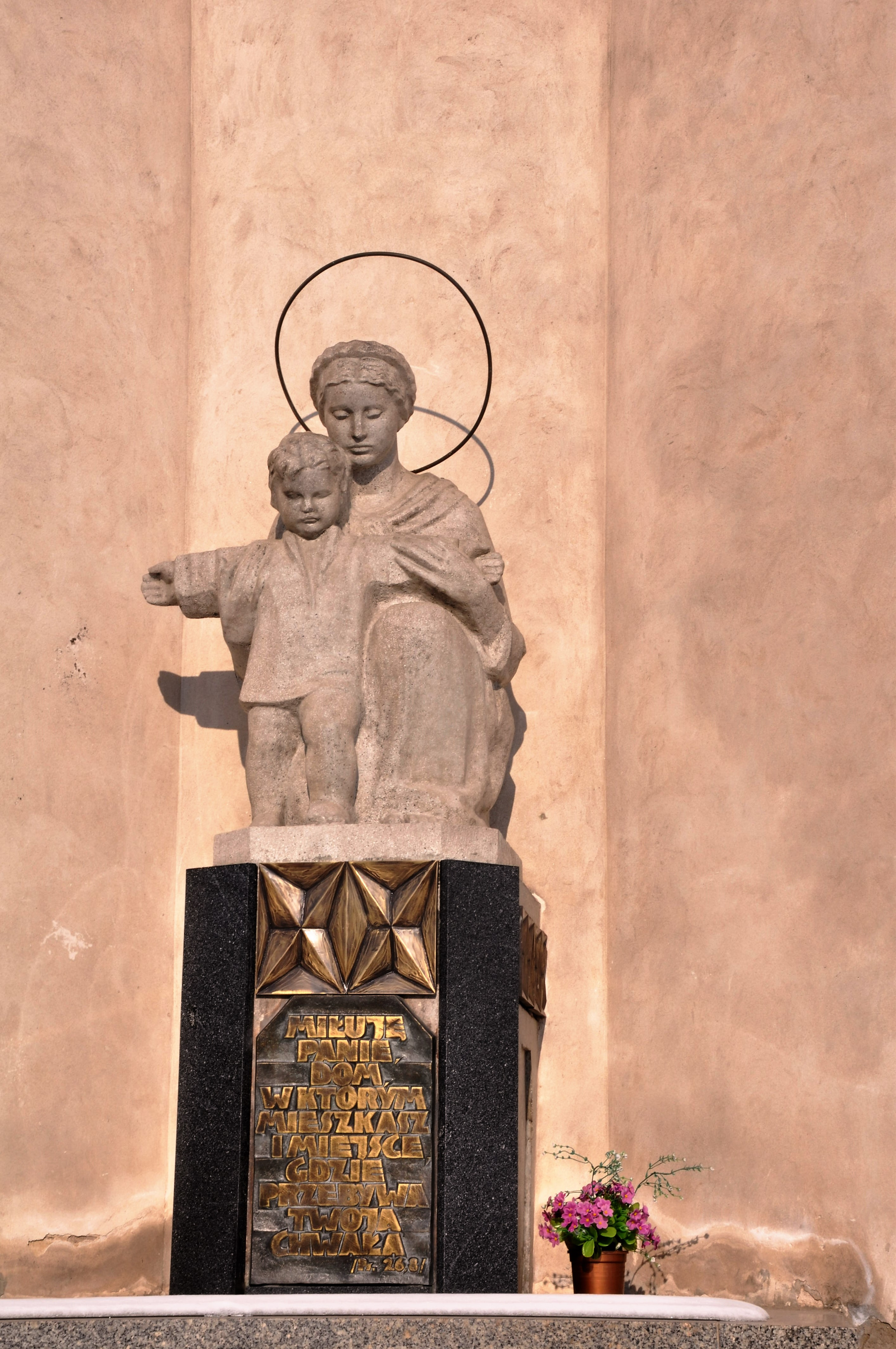
Mother of God with Child, side altar, St. Roch's Church, Białystok (late 1940s)

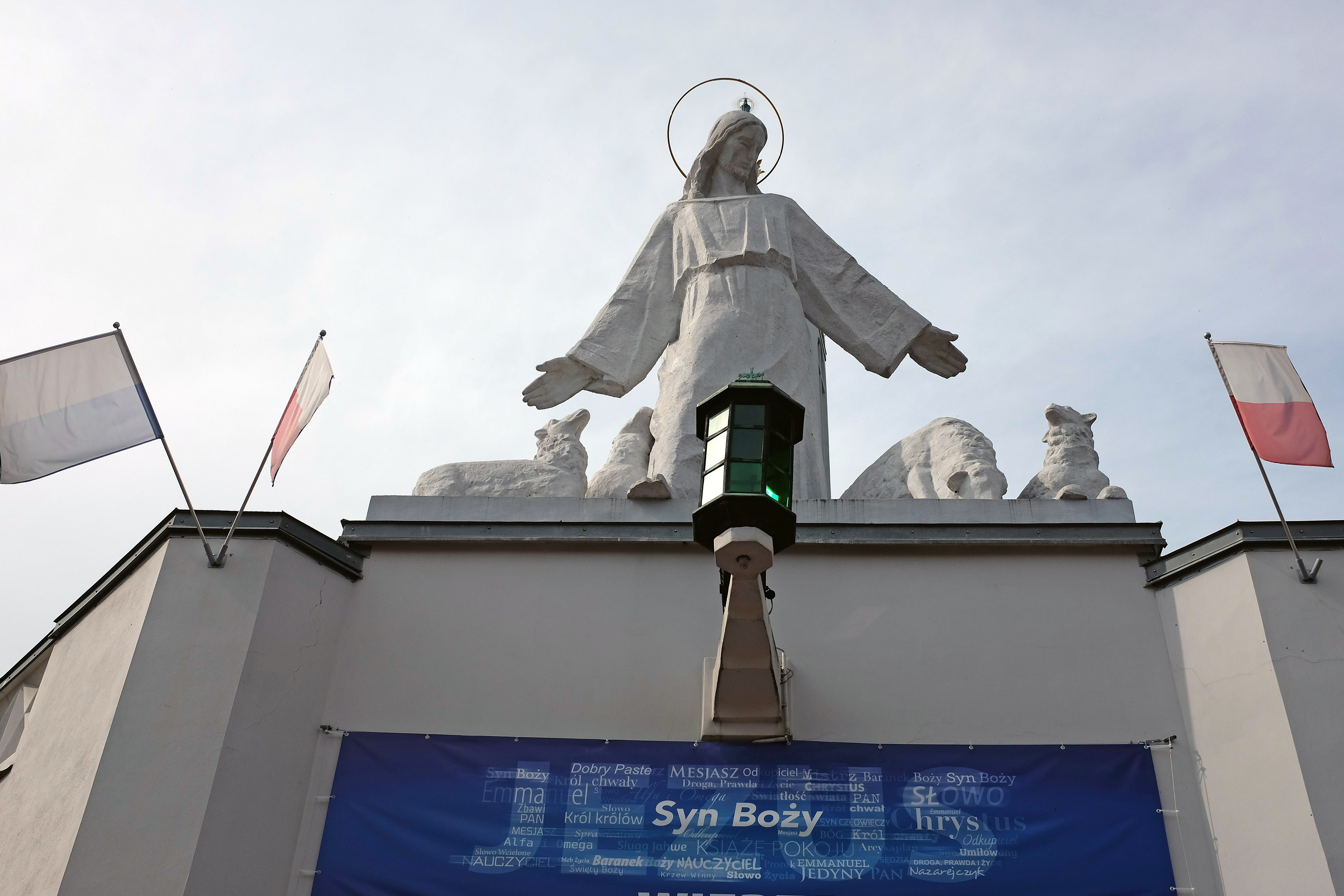
Christ the Good Shepherd, St. Roch's Church, Białystok (late 1940s)

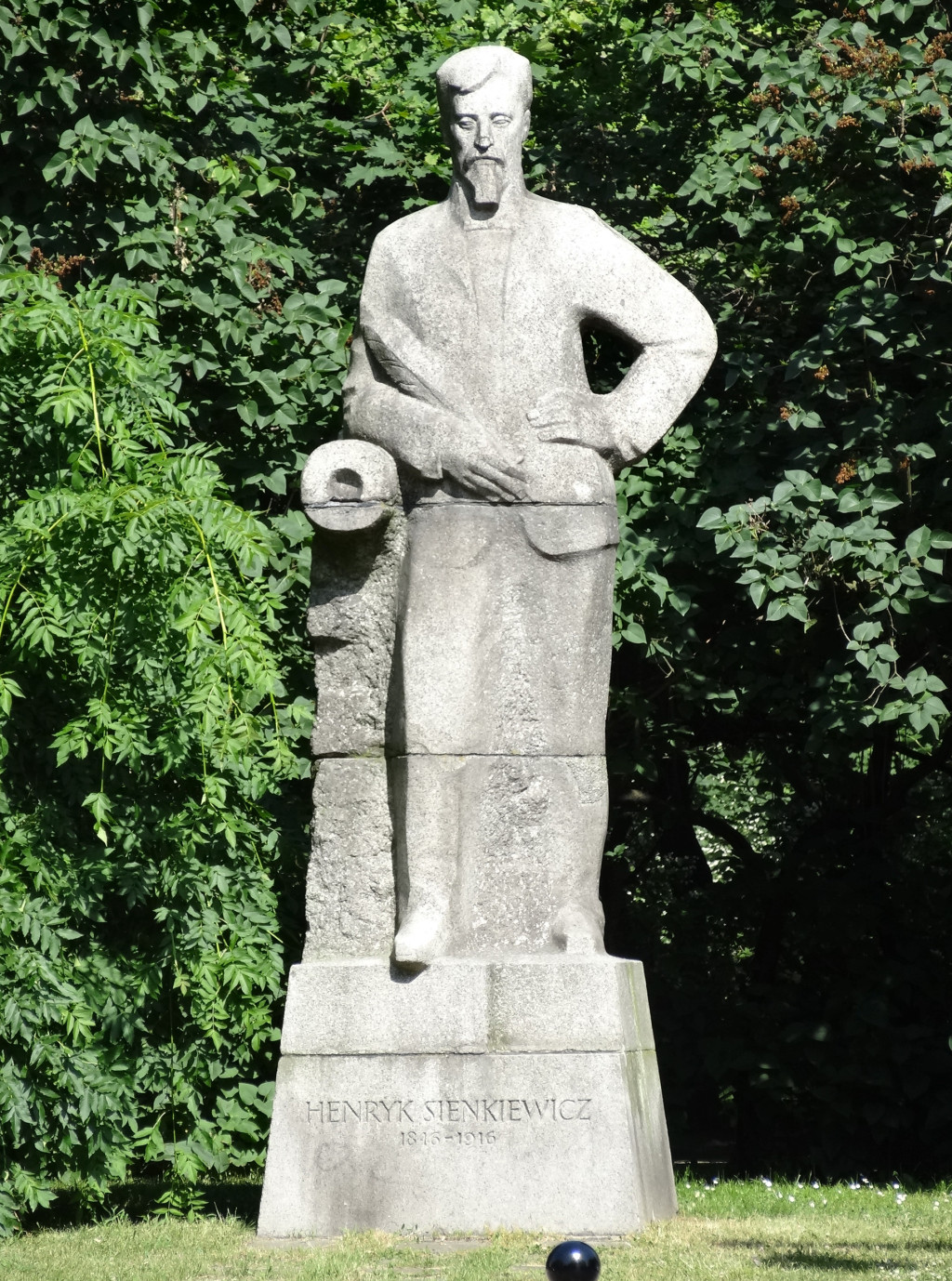
Monument to Henryk Sienkiewicz, Bydgoszcz (1968)

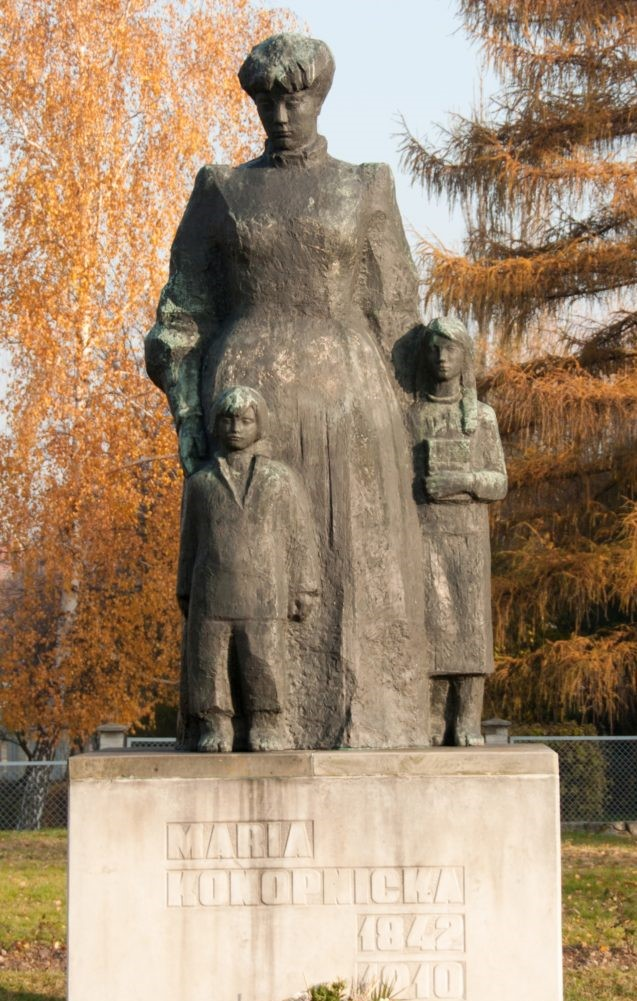
Monument to Maria Konopnicka, Kalisz (1969)

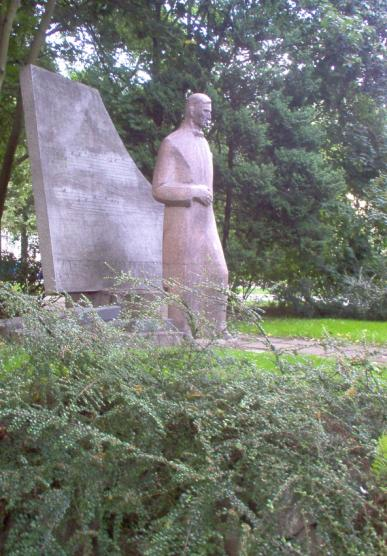
Monument to Karol Szymanowski, Słupsk (1972)

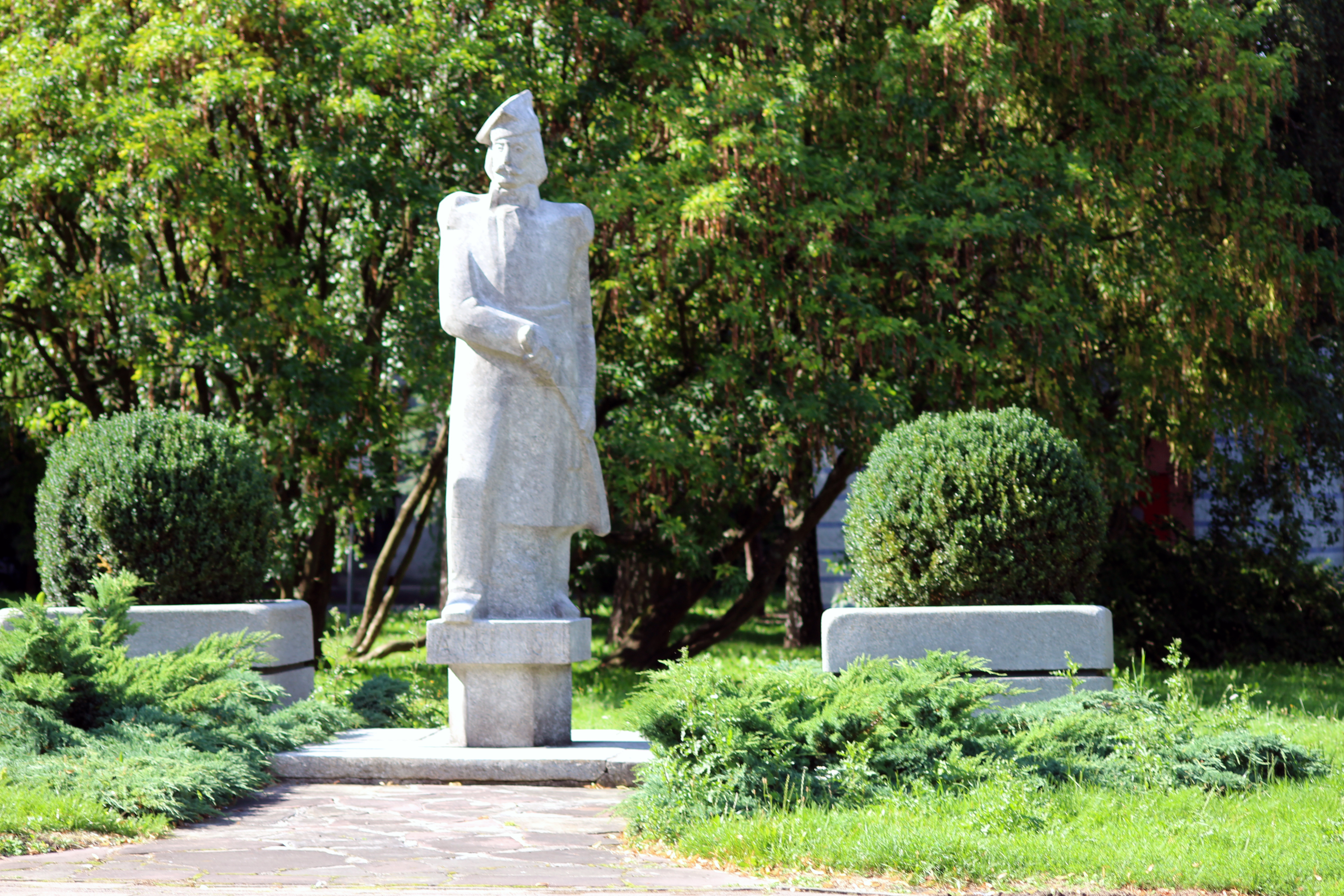
Monument to Jan Kiliński, Słupsk (1972)

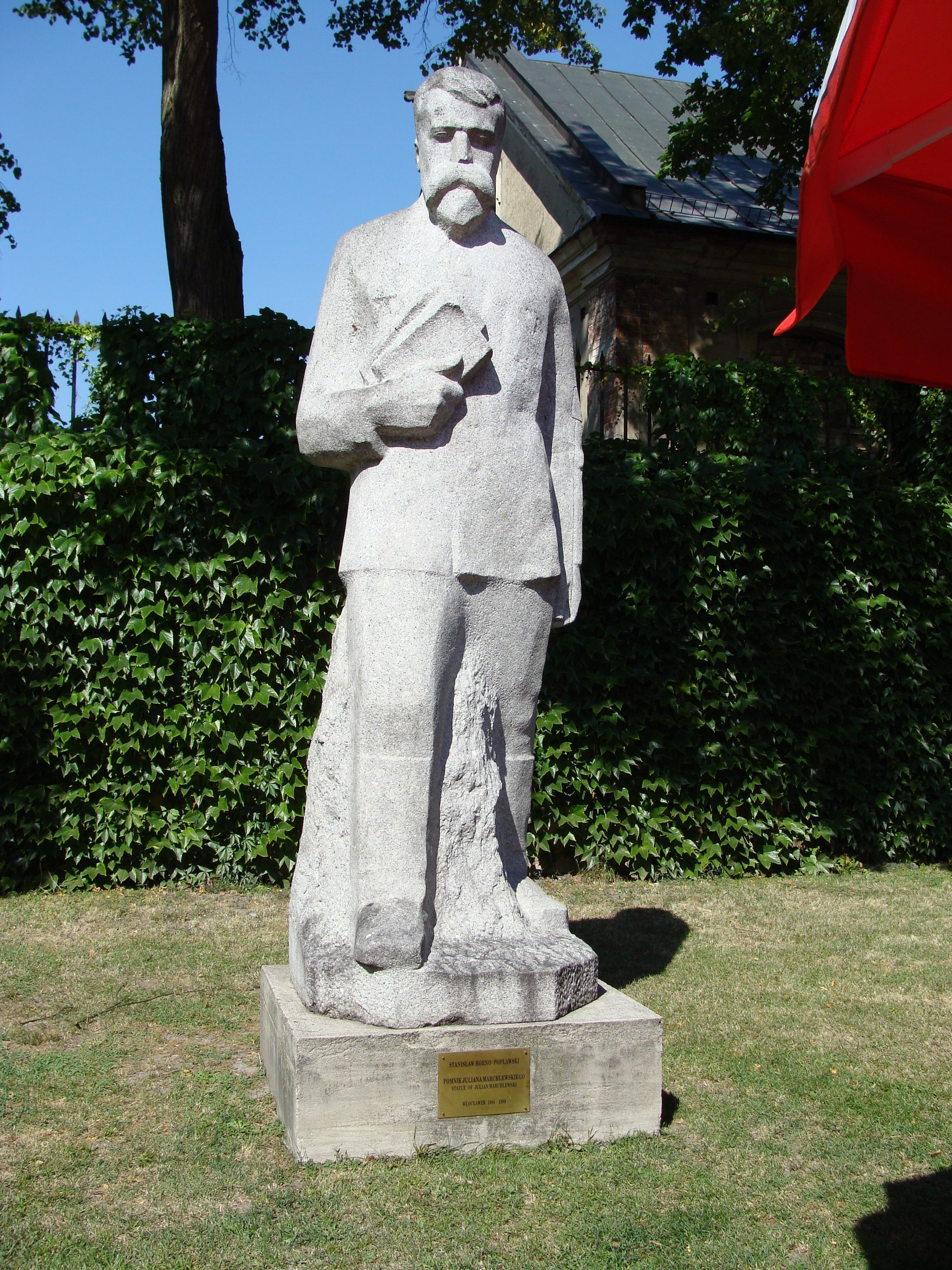
Monument to Julian Marchlewski, Zamoyski Palace in Kozłówka (1964)

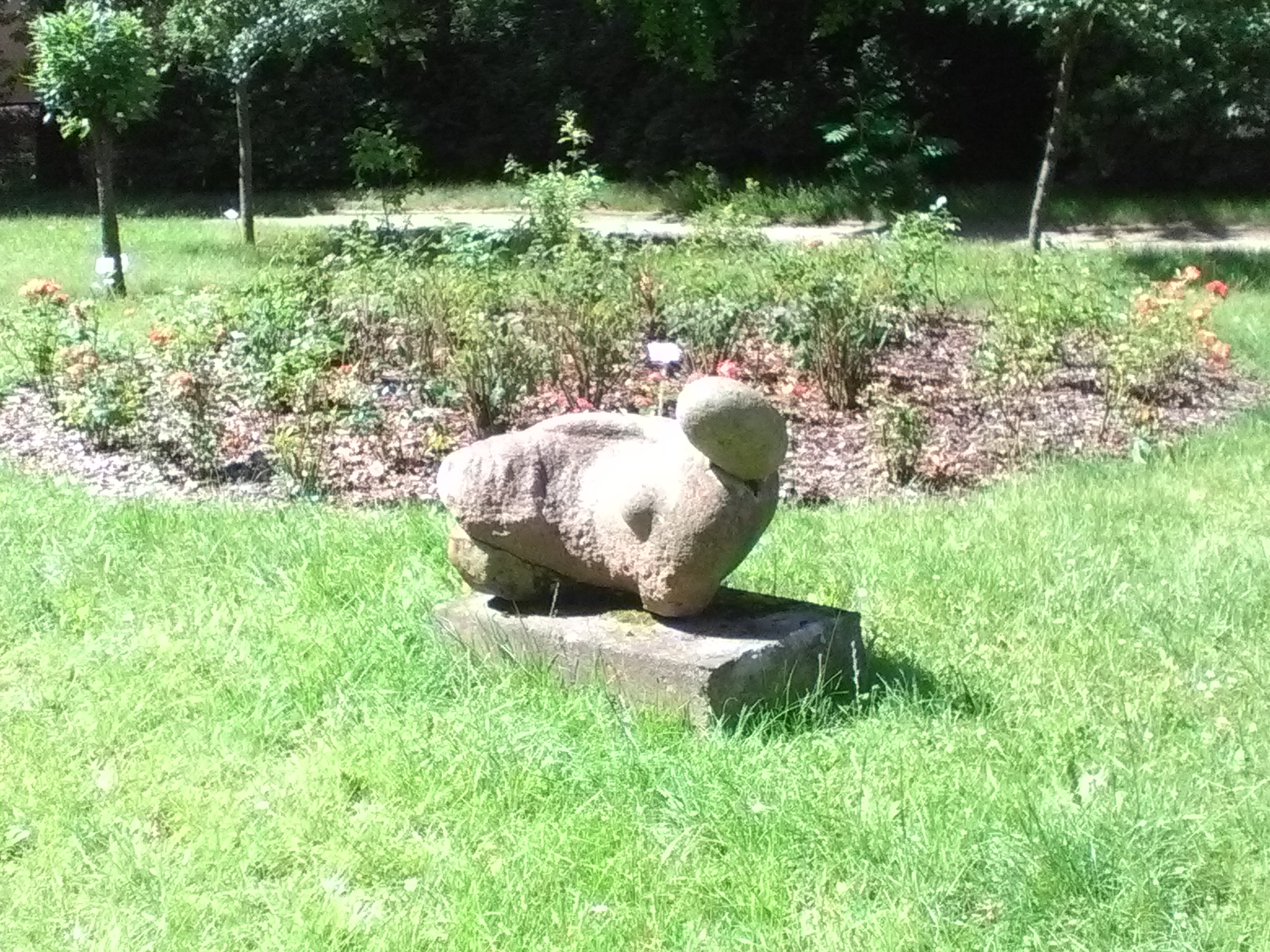
Sculpture in the Botanic Garden of Bydgoszcz (early 1980s)

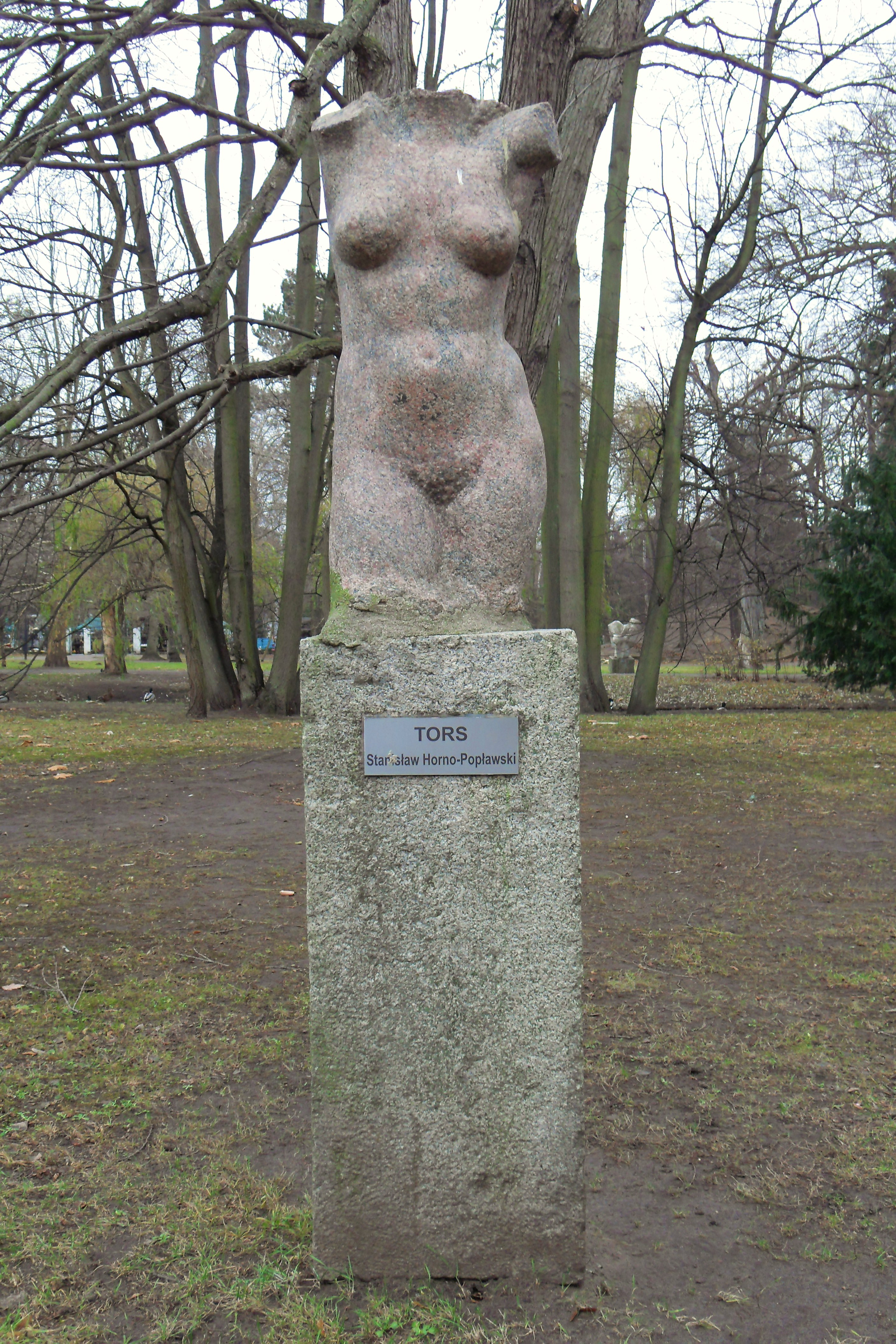
Torso, Park Oliwski

== See also ==
- Palace of Culture and Science
- Botanic Garden of Casimir the Great University, Bydgoszcz
- Vilnius University
- Oflag II-C

== Bibliography ==
- (in Polish) Agnieszka Markowska, Paweł Rzekanowski (2017). Stanisław Horno-Popławski. Katalog zbiorów Bydgoskiego Centrum Sztuki. Bydgoszcz: Bydgoski Centrum Sztuki. ISBN 9788365533227.
- (in Polish) Horno. Stanisław Horno-Popławski. Rzeźba. Katalog wystawy. — Warszawa: Centralne Biuro Wystaw Artystycznych «Zachęta», 1970.
- (in Polish) Dorota Grubba-Thiede, Jerzy Malinowski (2002). Stanisław Horno-Popławski. Droga sztuki – sztuka drogi. Sopot: Państwowa Galeria Sztuki.
- (in Polish) Ewa Toniak, Olbrzymki. Kobiety i socrealizm, wyd. Korporacja Ha!art, Kraków 2008
- (in Polish) Konik, Roman (2016). Stanisław Horno-Popławski. Myślenie kamieniem. Wrocław: Oficyna Wydawnicza Atut.
- (in Polish) Turwid, Marian (1980). Galeria Rzeźby Stanisława Horno-Popławskiego. Kalendarz Bydgoski. Bydgoszcz: Towarzystwo Miłośników Miasta Bydgoszczy. pp. 59–62.
