= Timeline of Włocławek =

The following is a timeline of the history of the city of Włocławek, Poland.

== Middle Ages ==
- 9th century – Establishment of Włocławek.
- 10th century – Włocławek included within the emerging Polish state.
- 1110s – Włocławek first mentioned in the Gesta principum Polonorum chronicle.
- 1136 – Włocławek mentioned in the Bull of Gniezno.
- 1138 – Włocławek became part of the provincial Duchy of Masovia within Poland.
- 1215 – Local school first mentioned.
- 1231 – Włocławek became part of the provincial Duchy of Kuyavia within Poland.
- 1255 – Włocławek granted city rights by Duke Casimir I of Kuyavia from the Piast dynasty.
- 1250s – Castellany relocated from Włocławek to Brześć Kujawski.
- 1267 – Włocławek became part of the provincial Duchy of Brześć Kujawski within Poland.
- 1329 – Teutonic raid.

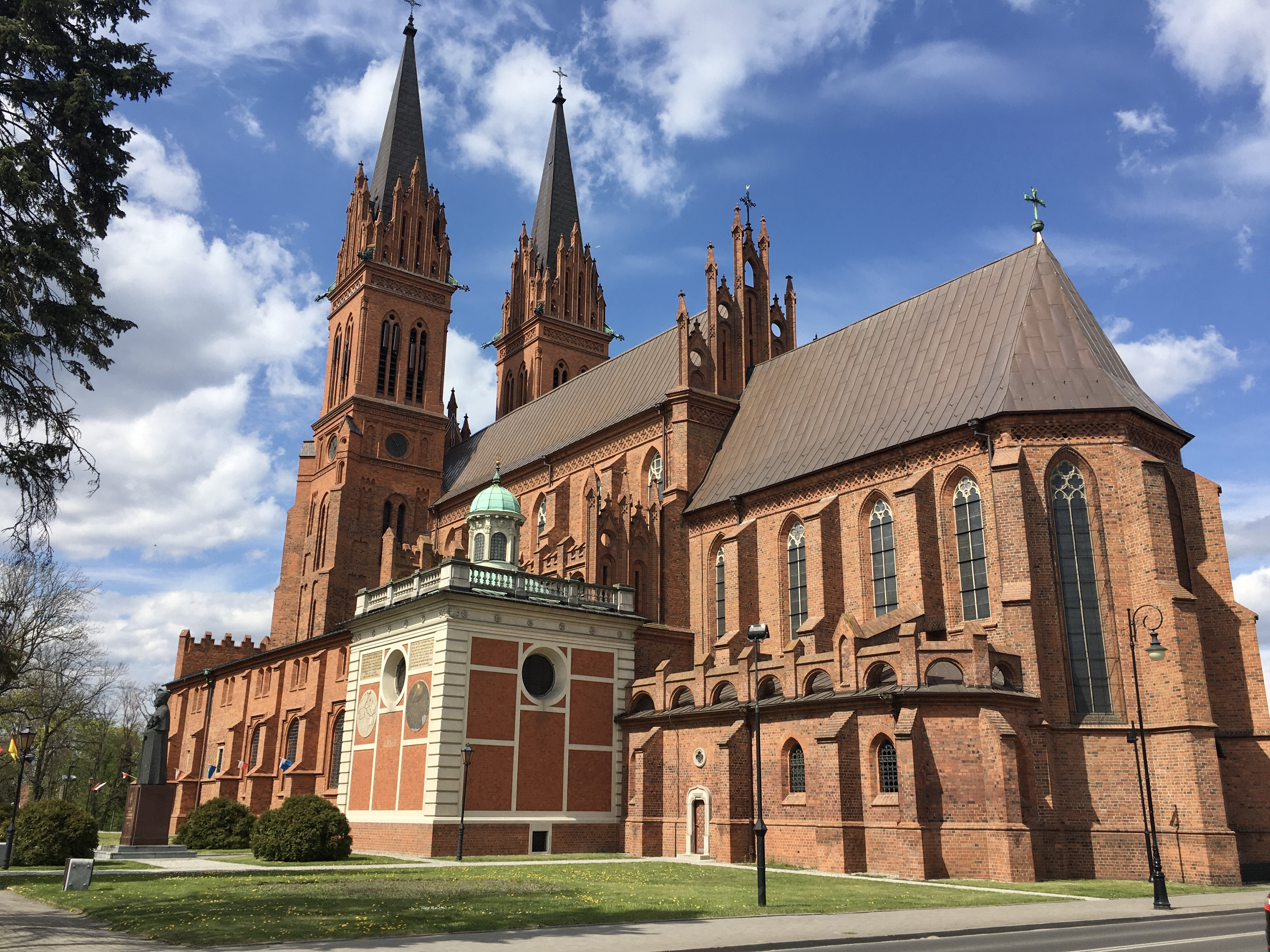
Gothic Włocławek Cathedral, seat of the Roman Catholic Diocese of Włocławek

- 1340 – Bishop Maciej of Gołańcz laid the foundation stone of the new Gothic Włocławek Cathedral.
- 1411 – Włocławek Cathedral consecrated by Bishop Jan Kropidło.
- 1480s – Nicolaus Copernicus possibly attended the local cathedral school.

== 16th to 18th centuries ==
- 1538 – Gothic Saint John the Baptist church consecrated.
- 1569 – August 16: Bishop Stanisław Karnkowski founded a theological seminary in Włocławek, one of the oldest seminaries in Poland.
- 1587 – Sigismund III Vasa visited Włocławek on the way to his royal coronation in Kraków.
- 1593 – Visit of King Sigismund III Vasa.
- 1625 – Reformed Franciscans brought to Włocławek by Bishop Andrzej Lipski.
- 1644 – Baroque Reformed Franciscan church consecrated by Bishop Piotr Mieszkowski.
- 1790 – Stay of Tadeusz Kościuszko in Włocławek.
- 1793 – City annexed by Prussia in the Second Partition of Poland.
- 1794 – Kościuszko Uprising: Dionizy Mniewski sank Prussian ships with ammunition headed for besieged Warsaw.
- 1797 – Salt granaries built.

== 19th century ==
- 1806 – City captured by the French.
- 1807 – Włocławek becomes part of the Duchy of Warsaw.
- 1815 – Włocławek passes to the Russian Partition of Poland.
- 1832 – Bojańczyk's Brewery founded.
- 1840 – Nadbrzeżna Street (present-day Marshal Józef Piłsudski Boulevards) outlined.
- 1854 – Synagogue built.
- 1862 – Włocławek railway station opened.
- 1863 – 8 November: Clash between Polish insurgents and Russian troops during the January Uprising.
- 1864 – 17 February: Clash between Polish insurgents and Russian troops during the January Uprising.
- 1870 – Henryk Sienkiewicz Park founded.
- 1873 – Faience factory established.
- 1886 – Włocławek Rowing Society founded.

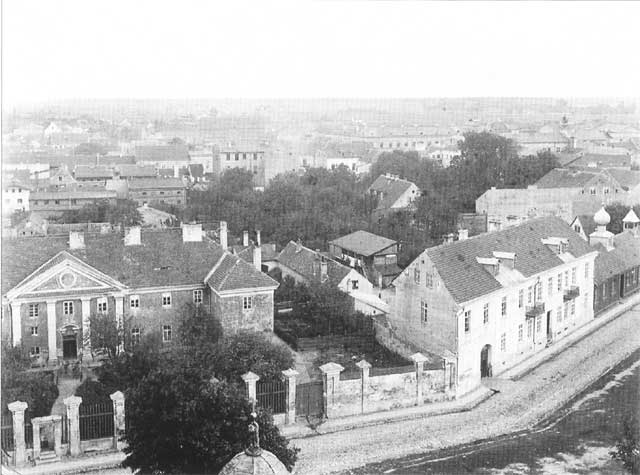
Włocławek in 1896

== 20th century ==
- 1901 – Diocesan Museum founded.
- 1907 – Kronika Diecezji Kujawsko-Kaliskiej begins publishing.
- 1908 – Museum of Kuyavia and Dobrzyń Land founded.
- 1909 – Oldest Polish theological journal Ateneum Kapłańskie began publishing.
- 1911 – Building of the former Gdańsk Bank in Włocławek built.

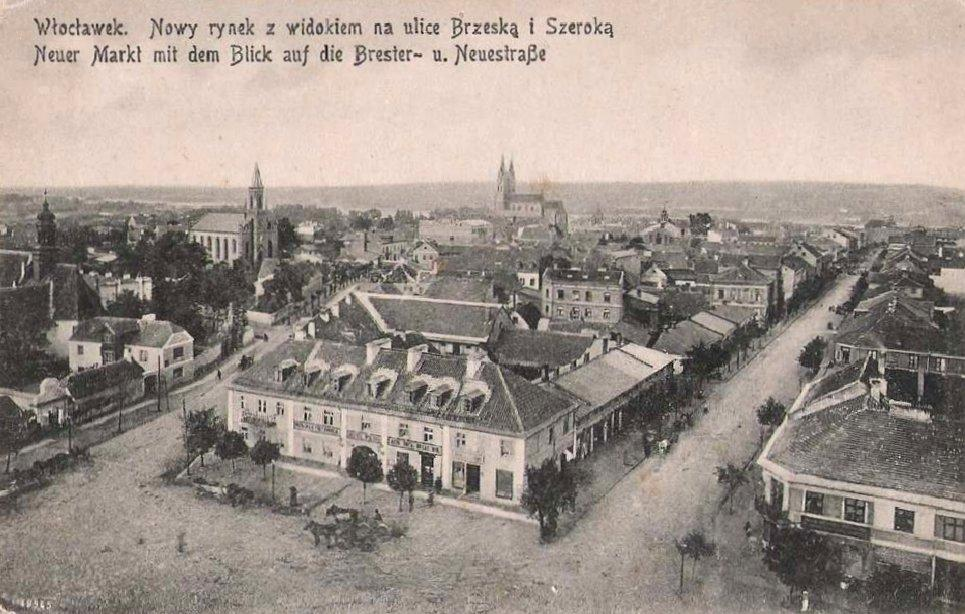
Włocławek during German occupation in World War I

- 1914
  - 5 August: World War I: Germans occupy the city.
  - 23 August: Russians re-occupy the city.
  - 21 September: Germans re-occupy the city.
  - 8 November: Russians re-occupy the city.
  - 12 November: Germans re-occupy the city.

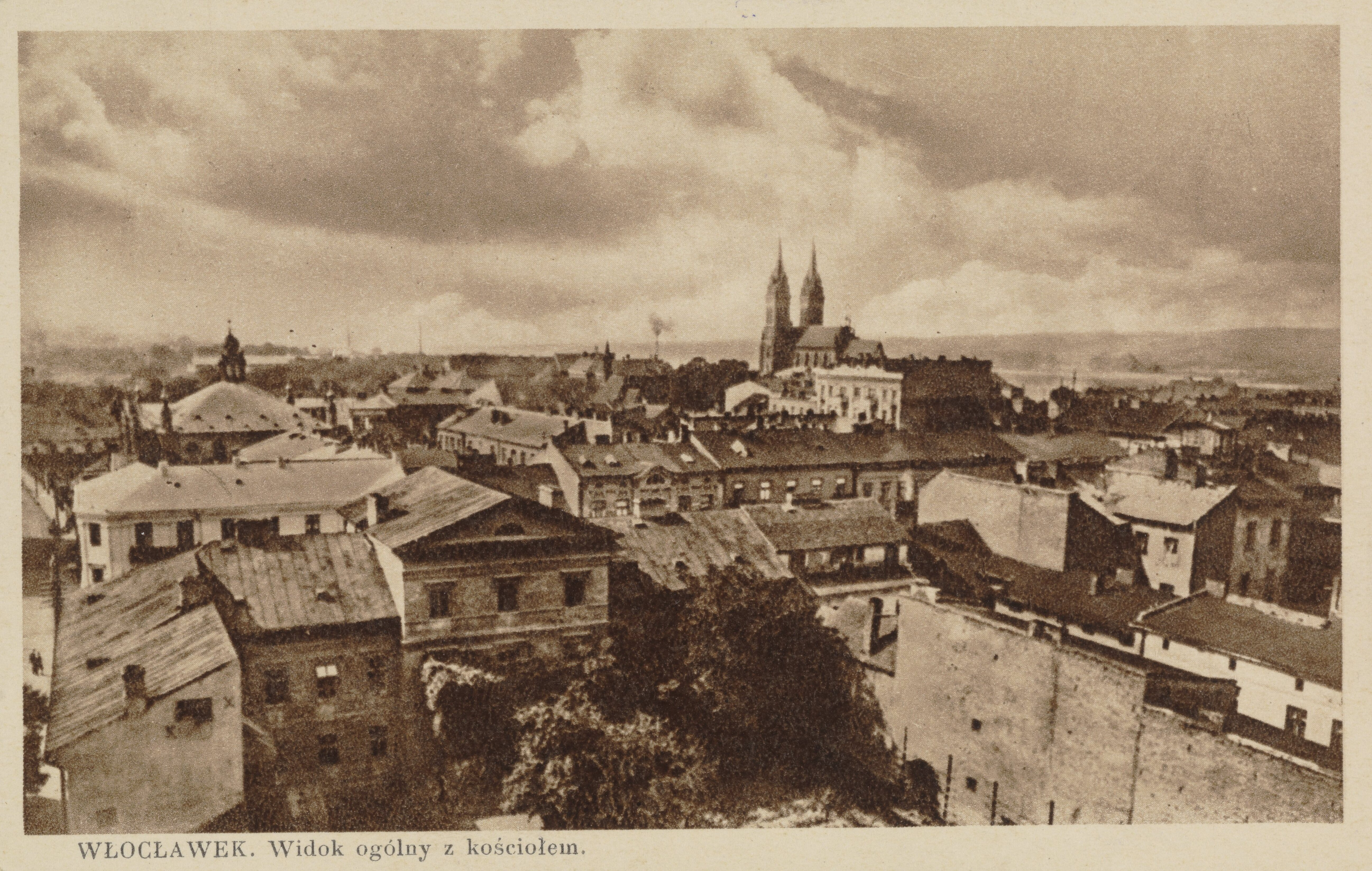
Włocławek in the interbellum

- 1918 – Poland regained independence and the Poles disarmed the Germans and liberated the city.
- 1920 – 13–19 August: Successful Polish defense against the invading Russians during the Polish–Soviet War.
- 1927 – City limits greatly expanded by including several settlements as new districts, including Kapitułka, Krzywe Błoto, Lisek, Łęg, Słodowo, Świech and Zazamcze.
- 1937 – Edward Śmigły-Rydz Bridge built.
- 1939
  - September: Beginning of German occupation during World War II.
  - 9 September: German invaders committed a massacre of a group of local Jews.
  - October-November: Einsatzgruppe III carried out mass arrests of local Poles, including teachers, priests, lecturers and students of the seminary and Auxiliary Bishop of Włocławek Michał Kozal, during the genocidal Intelligenzaktion campaign.
  - 29 October: Włocławek became the first city in which the Germans imposed yellow badges on the Jews.
  - November-December: SS and Selbstschutz burnt down the Grzywno district and murdered many of its inhabitants in the nearby village of Warząchewka Polska.
  - Arrested Polish teachers, landowners and priests from the Włocławek and Lipno counties imprisoned in a local prison by the Germans, with some later deported to concentration camps and murdered.
  - Families of deported and murdered Poles, as well as the remaining residents of Grzywno were expelled to the so-called General Government in the more-eastern part of German-occupied Poland.

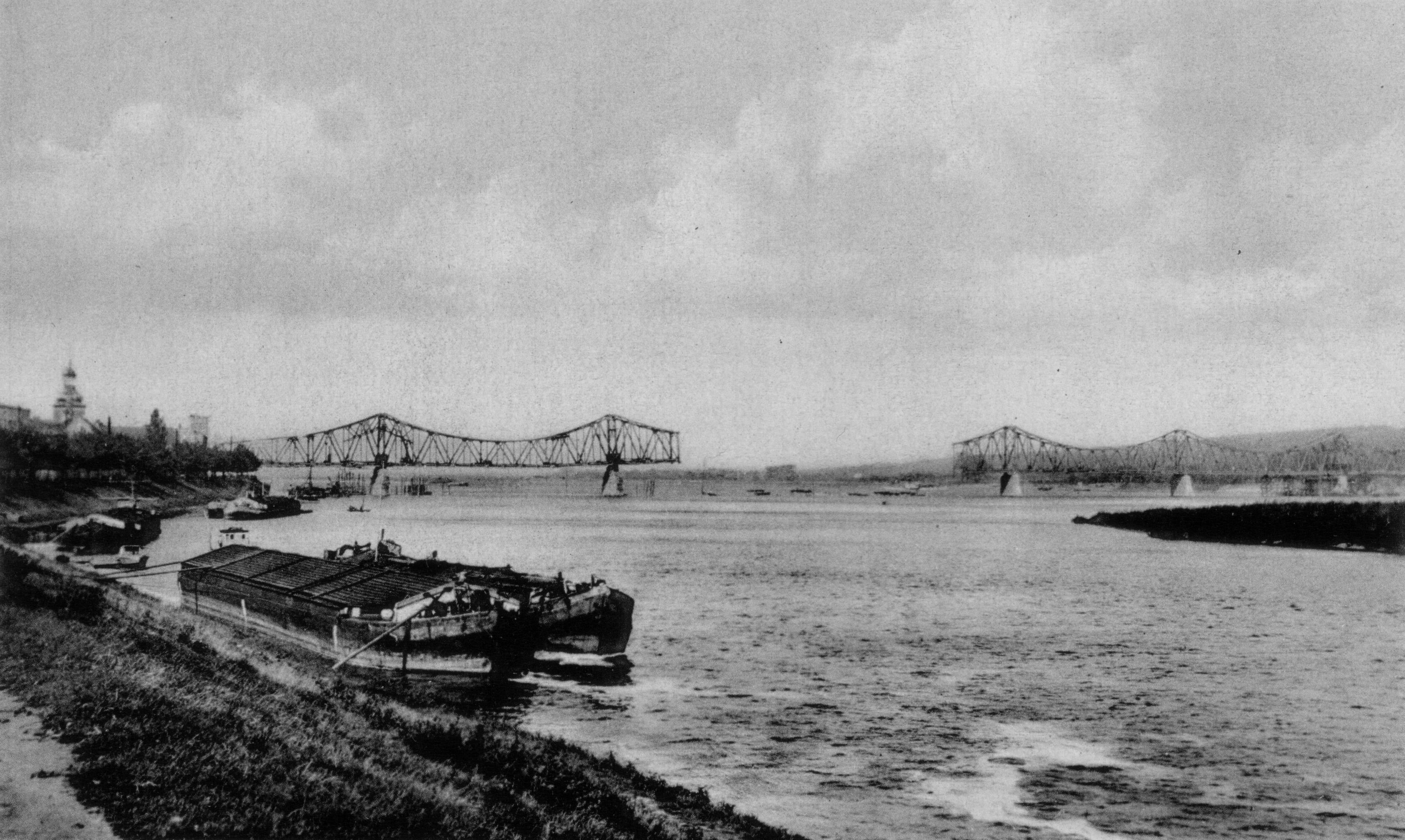
Bridge during German occupation in World War II

- 1940
  - January: The Germans carried out deportations of arrested priests to the Dachau concentration camp, where most were eventually killed.
  - June, September: The Germans carried out further expulsions of Poles, including owners of shops, workshops and bigger houses, which were handed over to German colonists as part of the Lebensraum policy.
  - Autumn: Jewish ghetto established by the occupiers.
- 1942 – April: Liquidation of the ghetto. surviving Jews deported by the Germans to the Chełmno extermination camp.
- 1945
  - 4 April: Seminary resumed activities in Lubraniec.
  - May: Seminary relocated from Lubraniec back to Włocławek.
- 1946 – Włocłavia Włocławek football club founded.
- 1952 – Kujawskie Zakłady Przemysłu Owocowo-Warzywnego Włocławek food company, manufacturer of the Włocławek ketchup, established.
- 1970 – Hydroelectric power plant in Włocławek opened.
- 1973
  - Zarzeczewo Marina in Włocławek launched.
  - Włocławek became a member of the Federation of Copernican Cities.
- 1975
  - Włocławek became capital of the newly formed Włocławek Voivodeship.
  - Monument to Polish railwaymen murdered during World War II unveiled.
- 1984 – Assassination of Jerzy Popiełuszko.
- 1986 – Ethnographic Museum in Włocławek opened.
- 1990 – KK Włocławek basketball club founded.
- 1991 – Monument to Priest Jerzy Popiełuszko unveiled.
- 1999 – Włocławek became part of the Kuyavian-Pomeranian Voivodeship

== 21st century ==
- 2001 – Hala Mistrzów indoor arena opened.
- 2002 – State Academy of Applied Sciences in Włocławek founded.
- 2003 – Anwil Włocławek won its first Polish basketball championship.
- 2009 – Wzorcownia shopping centre opened.
- 2018 – Jan Długosz Monument unveiled.
- 2022 – Silent Unseen Monument unveiled.

== See also ==
- Timeline of Bydgoszcz

== Bibliography ==
- Przewodnik ilustrowany po Włocławku (in Polish). Włocławek: Księgarnia Powszechna i Drukarnia Diecezjalna we Włocławku. 1922.
- Wardzyńska, Maria (2009). Był rok 1939. Operacja niemieckiej policji bezpieczeństwa w Polsce. Intelligenzaktion (in Polish). Warszawa: IPN.
- Atlas historyczny miast polskich. Tom II: Kujawy. Zeszyt 4: Włocławek (in Polish). Toruń: Wydawnictwo Naukowe Uniwersytetu Mikołaja Kopernika. 2016. ISBN 978-83-231-3551-7.
- Wardzyńska, Maria (2017). Wysiedlenia ludności polskiej z okupowanych ziem polskich włączonych do III Rzeszy w latach 1939-1945 (in Polish). Warszawa: IPN. ISBN 978-83-8098-174-4.
