= Timeline of Bydgoszcz =

The following is a timeline of history of the city of Bydgoszcz, Poland.

== Prior to 20th century ==
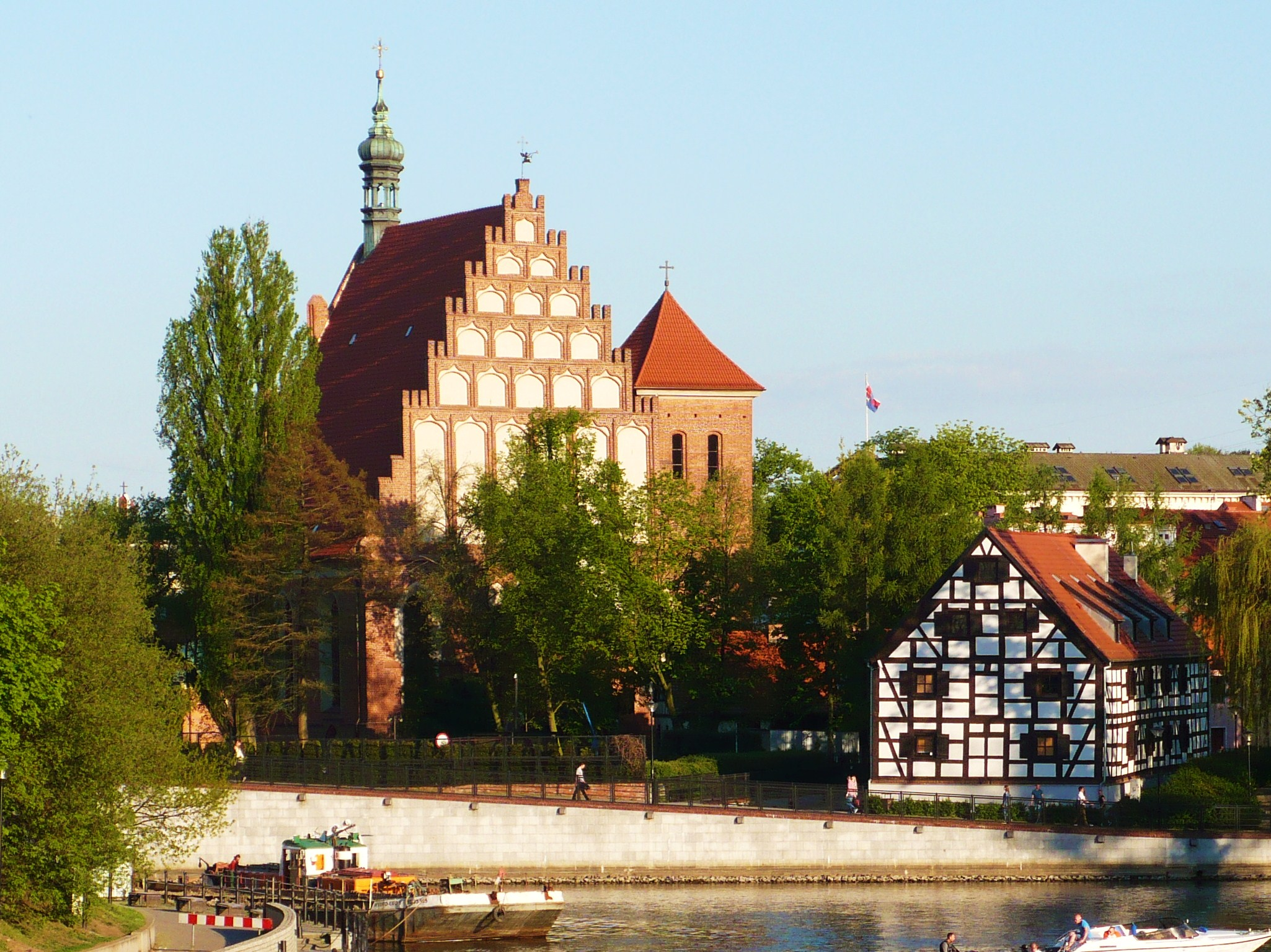
Gothic Bydgoszcz Cathedral

- c. 150s A.D. – Identified as Askaukalis, mentioned by Ptolemy in Geography (Γεωγραφικὴ Ὑφήγησις) and one of 94 located on Magna Germania.
- 1037–1053 – Fortified stronghold built.
- 1346 – Bydgoszcz granted city rights by King Casimir III the Great.
- 1520 – Sejm of the Kingdom of Poland held in Bydgoszcz.
- 1557 – Bernardine Church completed.
- 1594 – Mint established.
- 1619 – Jesuit school, present day High School No. 1, founded.
- 1645 – Poor Clares' Church completed.
- 1657 – Treaty of Bydgoszcz signed.
- 1764 – Bydgoszcz became one of three seats of the Crown Tribunal for the Greater Poland Province after the Convocation Sejm of 1764.
- 1767 – Józef Wybicki, author of the lyrics of the national anthem of Poland, works at the Crown Tribunal in Bydgoszcz.
- 1772 – Bydgoszcz annexed by Prussia in the First Partition of Poland.
- 1794 – City recaptured by Poles led by General Jan Henryk Dąbrowski during the Kościuszko Uprising.
- 1806 – Polish 6th Uhlan Regiment formed in Bydgoszcz.
- 1807 – Bydgoszcz becomes part of the Duchy of Warsaw
- 1815 – Bydgoszcz re-annexed by Prussia.
- 1864 – National Bank of Poland building completed.
- 1871 – City becomes part of the German Empire.
- 1872 – Special educational centre for blind children founded.
- 1899 – Main Post Office completed.

== 20th century ==
=== 1901–1939 ===
- 1906 – Municipal Market Hall and Copernicanum building completed.
- 1908 – Population: 57,696.
- 1919 – Bydgoszcz restored to Poland after the country regained independence.
- 1920
  - 24 January: 62th Infantry Regiment of the Polish Army stationed in Bydgoszcz.
  - 14 May: Polonia Bydgoszcz football club (future multi-sports club) founded.
  - 69th Infantry Regiment of the Polish Army stationed in Bydgoszcz.
- 1921 – 1 November: 62th Infantry Regiment of the Polish Army relocated from Gniezno to Bydgoszcz.
- 1923 – Regional Museum in Bydgoszcz founded.
- 1929 – City hosts the 1929 European Rowing Championships.
- 1930 – Botanic Garden of Casimir the Great University founded as the Municipal Botanic Garden.

=== World War II (1939–1945) ===
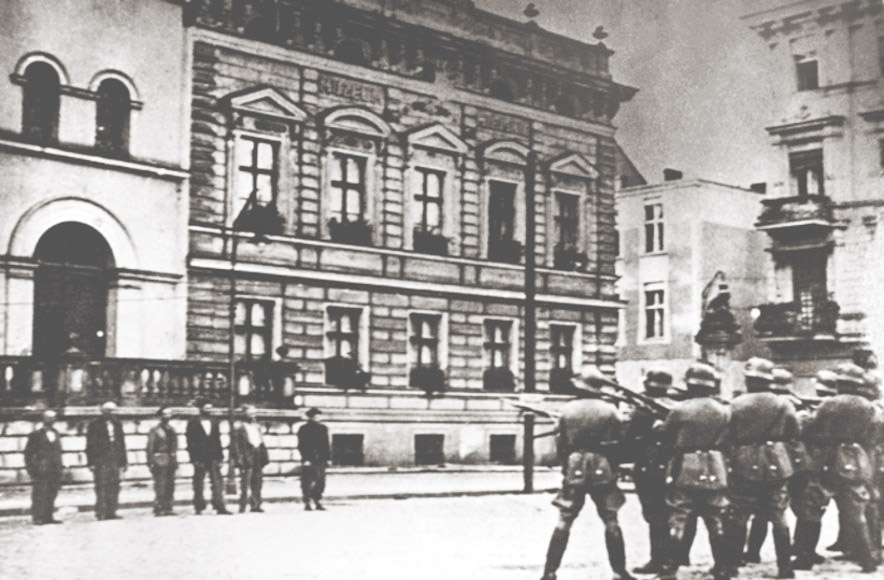
German execution of Polish hostages at the Market Square in 1939

- 1939
  - September: City is occupied by Nazi Germany.
  - 3 September: German diversion, resulting in Polish-German skirmishes, which were referred to as the Bloody Sunday by propaganda of Nazi Germany to serve as an excuse for planned German massacres of Polish residents.
  - 3–10 September: Germans massacred 192 Poles in the city.
  - September: Einsatzgruppe IV, Einsatzkommando 16 and SS-Totenkopf-Standarte "Brandenburg" Nazi paramilitary death squads entered the city.
  - 10 September: Germans carried out mass searches of houses throughout the city.
  - 24 September: Appointed German Kreisleiter called local Polish city officials to a supposed formal meeting in the city hall, from where they were taken to a nearby forest and exterminated. He also ordered the execution of their family members to "avoid creating martyrs".
  - September: Nazi prison and forced labour camp established by the Germans at Wały Jagiellońskie Street.
  - 22, 29 September: Massacres of 250 Polish activists previously imprisoned in a local Selbstschutz prison during the Intelligenzaktion.
  - 30 September: Over 3,000 Poles imprisoned by the Germans in the city as of 30 September.
  - Early October: Further mass arrests of over 2,000 Poles.
  - 18–20 October: Further mass arrests of nearly 1,500 Poles, incl. activists and teachers, carried out by the German police, Einsatzkommando 16 and Selbstschutz.
  - October–November: Large massacres of Poles and Jews carried out by the Germans in the Valley of Death.
  - 1 November: City unilaterally annexed by Germany.
  - 11 November: Further mass arrests of 3,800 Poles carried out by the German police and Selbstschutz.
  - 11 November: Public execution of pre-war Polish mayor Leon Barciszewski by the Germans.
  - 17 November: Commander of the local SD-EK unit declared there was no more Polish intelligentsia capable of resistance in the city.
  - November: Einsatzgruppen-operated penal camp established in the Jachcice district.
  - November–December: First expulsions of Poles from Bydgoszcz.
  - Massacres of over 1,400 Poles from Bydgoszcz, incl. teachers, activists, priests, old people, boy and girl scouts, gymnasium students, and children as young as 12, in the nearby village of Tryszczyn.
  - Bromberg Dynamit Nobel AG Factory founded.
- 1940
  - January: Poles from Bydgoszcz among the victims of a massacre perpetrated by the Selbstschutz in Jastrzębie.
  - May, September–October: Further expulsions of over 3,000 Poles from Bydgoszcz.
- 1941
  - January–February: Further expulsions of some 4,200 Poles from Bydgoszcz.
  - 4 February: First mass transport of 524 Poles sent from Bydgoszcz to the Potulice concentration camp.
  - May: Forced labour camp established by the Germans in the Smukała Dolna district.
  - September: Transit camp for expelled Poles from the region established in Smukała.

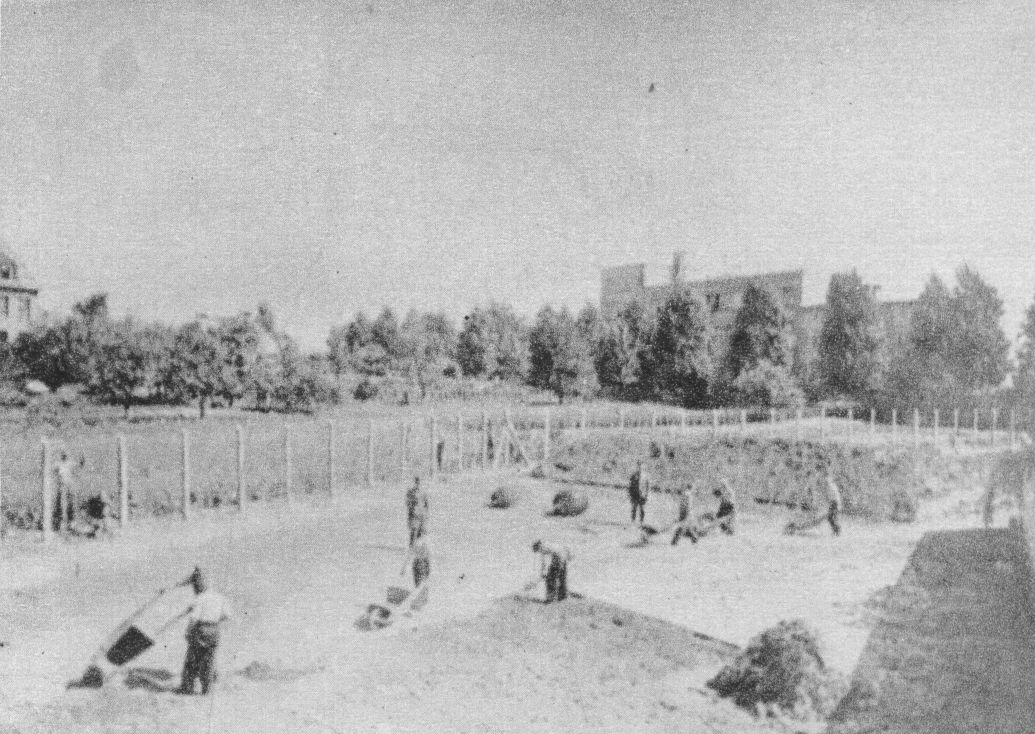
Forced labour of Polish prisoners in 1942

- 1943
  - March: Rescue of some kidnapped Polish children from the Zamość region by local Poles.
  - The local Polish resistance movement sheltered British prisoners of war who escaped from the German Stalag XX-A POW camp, and facilitated their escapes to neutral Sweden.
- 1944
  - 24 June: Explosion at the Dynamit Nobel AG Factory kills 15 people.
  - 12 September: Bromberg-Ost subcamp of the Stutthof concentration camp established by the Germans.
- 1945 – End of German occupation, Bydgoszcz restored to Poland.

=== 1945–2000 ===
- 1949 – Polish Theatre in Bydgoszcz completed.
- 1951 – Bydgoszcz University of Science and Technology founded.
- 1955 – Polonia Bydgoszcz wins its first Team Speedway Polish Championship.
- 1969 – Kazimierz Wielki University in Bydgoszcz founded.
- 1978 – Andrzej Szwalbe Collection of Historical Pianos founded by Andrzej Szwalbe.
- 1981 – Bydgoszcz events.
- 1984 – Nicolaus Copernicus University Ludwik Rydygier Collegium Medicum in Bydgoszcz founded.
- 1990 – First apartment block of the Independence Estate.
- 1993 – Pałac Bydgoszcz wins its first Polish women's volleyball championship.
- 2000 – Andrzej Szwalbe Collection of Historical Pianos relocated from Bydgoszcz to the Palaces and park ensemble in Ostromecko.

== 21st century ==
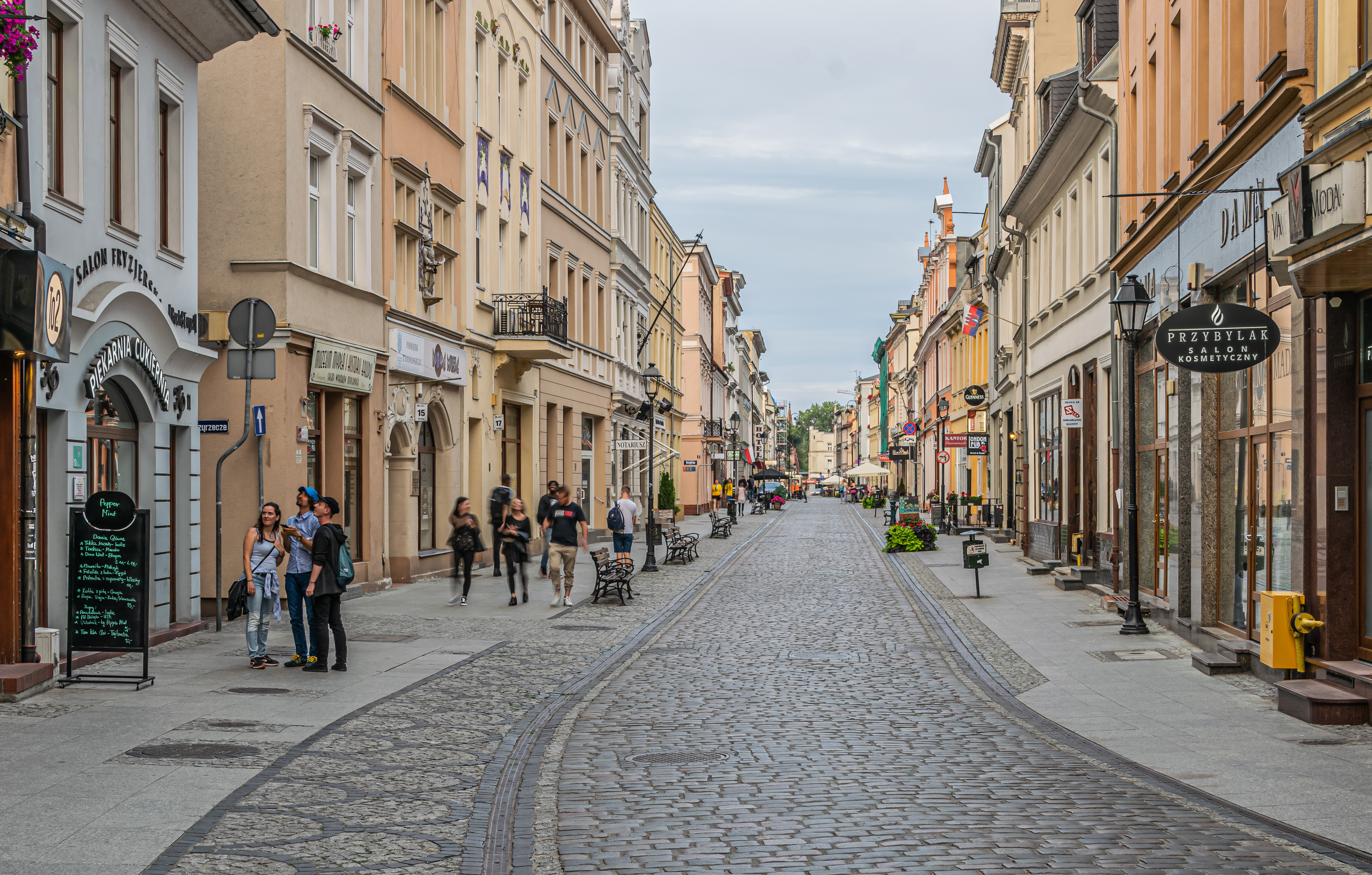
Bydgoszcz Old Town in 2019

- 2004
  - 24 February: Roman Catholic Diocese of Bydgoszcz established.
  - 31 March: NATO Joint Force Training Centre founded.
- 2005 – Marian Rejewski monument unveiled on the 100th anniversary of his birth.
- 2006 – Opera Nova Bydgoszcz completed.
- 2007 – Andrzej Szwalbe monument unveiled.
- 2009
  - September: City co-hosts the EuroBasket 2009.
  - September–October: City co-hosts the 2009 Women's European Volleyball Championship.
- 2010 – City hosts the 2010 IAAF World Cross Country Championships.
- 2011
  - June–July: City co-hosts the EuroBasket Women 2011.
  - 7 July: Exploseum founded.
- 2013 – City hosts the 2013 IAAF World Cross Country Championships.
- 2017 – City co-hosts the 2017 UEFA European Under-21 Championship.
- 2018 – May: Honorary Consulate of Montenegro opened.
- 2019
  - May–June: City co-hosts the 2019 FIFA U-20 World Cup.
  - 24 October: Monument to the Wisła Detachment of the Polish Navy, which fought in the area against the German invasion of 1939, unveiled.

== See also ==
- Bydgoszcz history
- History of Bydgoszcz
- List of presidents of Bydgoszcz
- Other names of Bydgoszcz e.g. Bromberg
- Timeline of Włocławek

== Bibliography ==
- Wardzyńska, Maria (2009). Był rok 1939. Operacja niemieckiej policji bezpieczeństwa w Polsce. Intelligenzaktion (in Polish). Warszawa: IPN.
- Wardzyńska, Maria (2017). Wysiedlenia ludności polskiej z okupowanych ziem polskich włączonych do III Rzeszy w latach 1939-1945 (in Polish). Warszawa: IPN. ISBN 978-83-8098-174-4.
