= Bojańczyk =

Bojańczyk is a Polish-language surname.

People with the surname include:

- Mikołaj Bojańczyk (born 1977), Polish computer scientist and logician
- Piotr Bojańczyk (born 1946), Polish ice dancer

== See also ==
- Jerzy Bojańczyk's Brewery in Włocławek
