= Ethnographic Museum in Włocławek =

Museum in Poland

Coordinates: 52.6596°N 19.0755°E

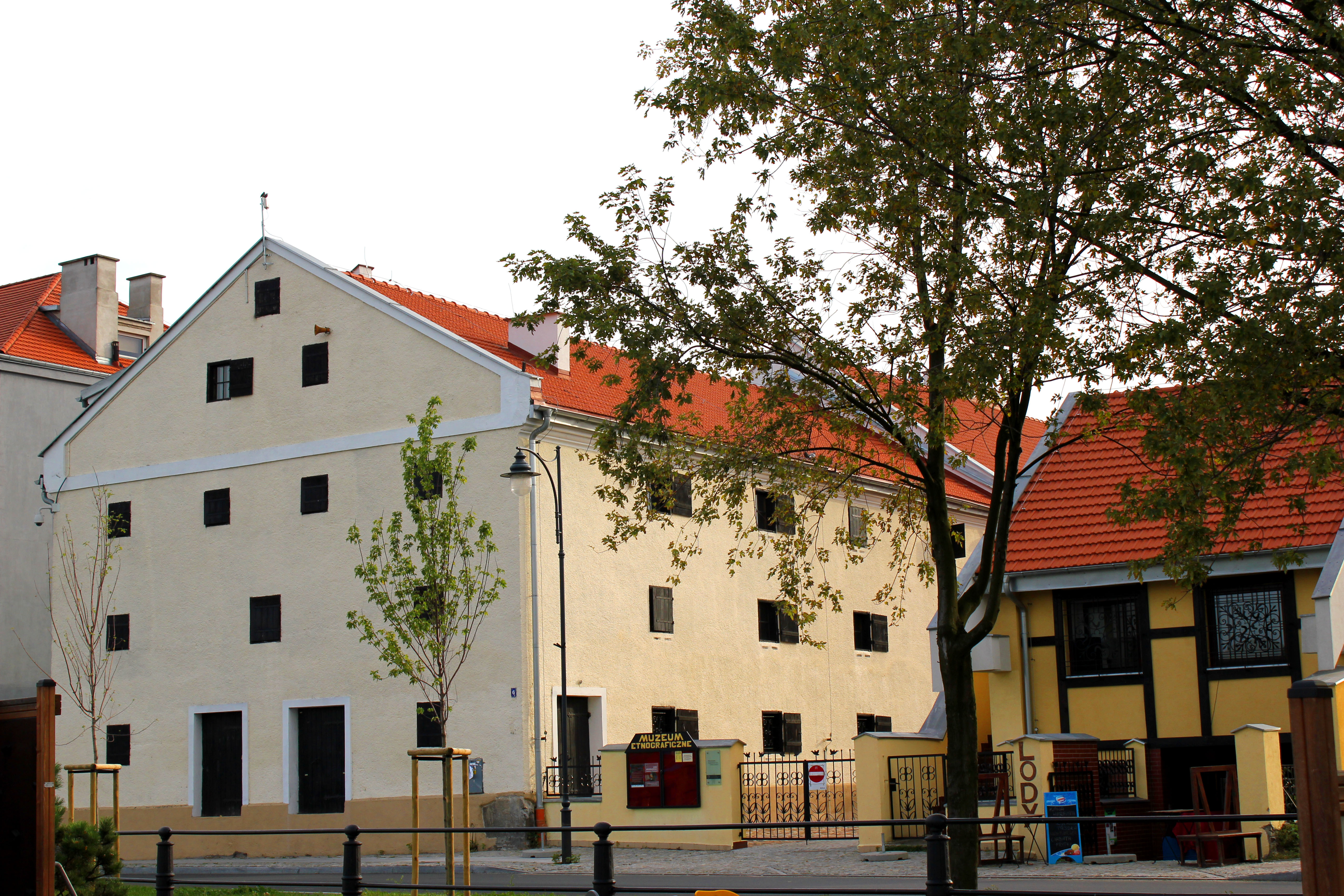
The seat of the Ethnographic Museum, J.Piłsudski Boulevards 6, Włocławek

The Ethnographic Museum in Włocławek - a branch of the Kujawy and Dobrzyń Land Museum in Włocławek.

== Location ==
The Museum is located in a building complex containing a historic granary on Marshal J. Piłsudski Boulevards No. 6 in Włocławek.

== History ==
The historic granary belonging to the museum was erected in the middle of the 19th century, prior to 1848 (designed by Franciszek Turnelle - the then city architect of Włocławek). In the years 1980–1985, a new part was added to its top. A temporary exhibition room, an audiovisual room, a library, studios and an office were arranged inside.

On 10 October 1986 the museum was officially opened and the permanent exhibition "Folk Culture of Kuyavia and Dobrzyń Land" was opened to the public, as well as a temporary exhibition "Contemporary Folk Art of Kujawy and Dobrzyń Land". The museum received a second degree award in the "Museum Event of the Year 1986" competition in 1987 for opening the building to the public and the permanent exhibition, while in 1988 it was awarded for the post-competition exhibition "Contemporary Regional Attire" in the "Museum Event of the Year 1988" competition.

From 2011 to 2014, renovation works were carried out on six buildings which are part of the museum complex: the interior and the courtyard were renovated, the attics and cellars were adapted to the needs of the museum and library collection warehouses. The Digitalisation and Reprography Workshop was established in the museum in 2015.

In 2016 the museum celebrated its 30th anniversary. During these 30 years, it organized nearly 100 temporary exhibitions and 37 mobile exhibitions. The museum's collection was enlarged by 5729 inventory items, more than 100 different events were organized, which gained considerable popularity among the inhabitants of Włocławek.

== Exhibitions ==
Permanent exhibition:

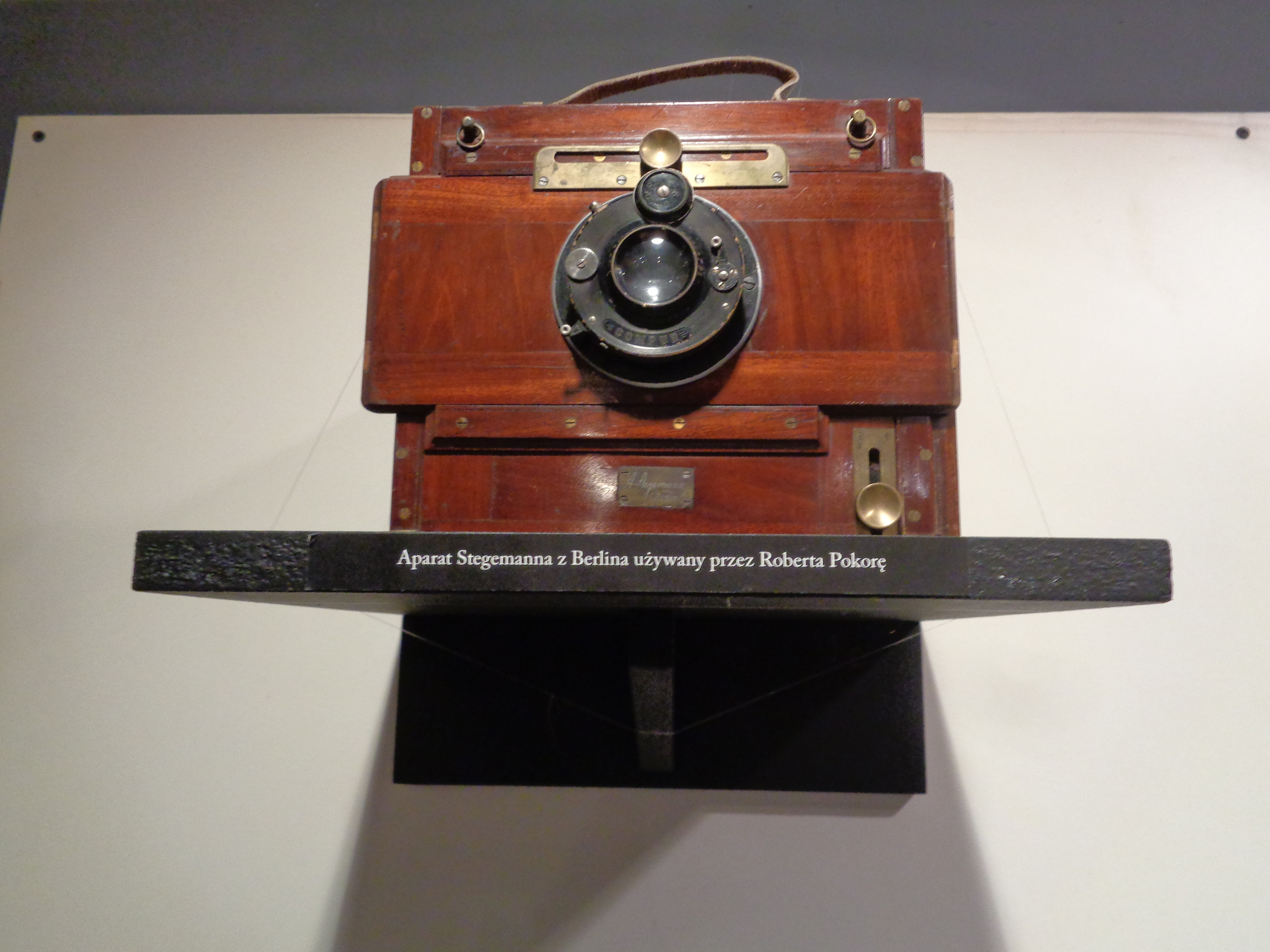
- The exhibition "Photographs by a shoemaker. The world on glass negatives by Robert Pokora"
  "Folk culture of Kuyavian and Dobrzyń Land" - presents a village from the turn of the 19th/20th century showing a non-existent folk culture.

Shrovetide events have been organised in the museum since 1986, which in 1995 became the annual "Processions of Shrovetide Groups along the streets of Włocławek". The Ethnographic Museum periodically organizes "Sunday with the Custodian" meetings, during which participants can visit temporary exhibitions.

From 2014, the museum's courtyard hosts the 'Włocławek Market with the Gifts of Summer' - a culinary event promoting traditional products made from local resources.

The Museum also runs a wide range of educational activities: year-round and occasional workshops.
