= Zarzeczewo Marina =

Coordinates: 52.67°N 19.17°E

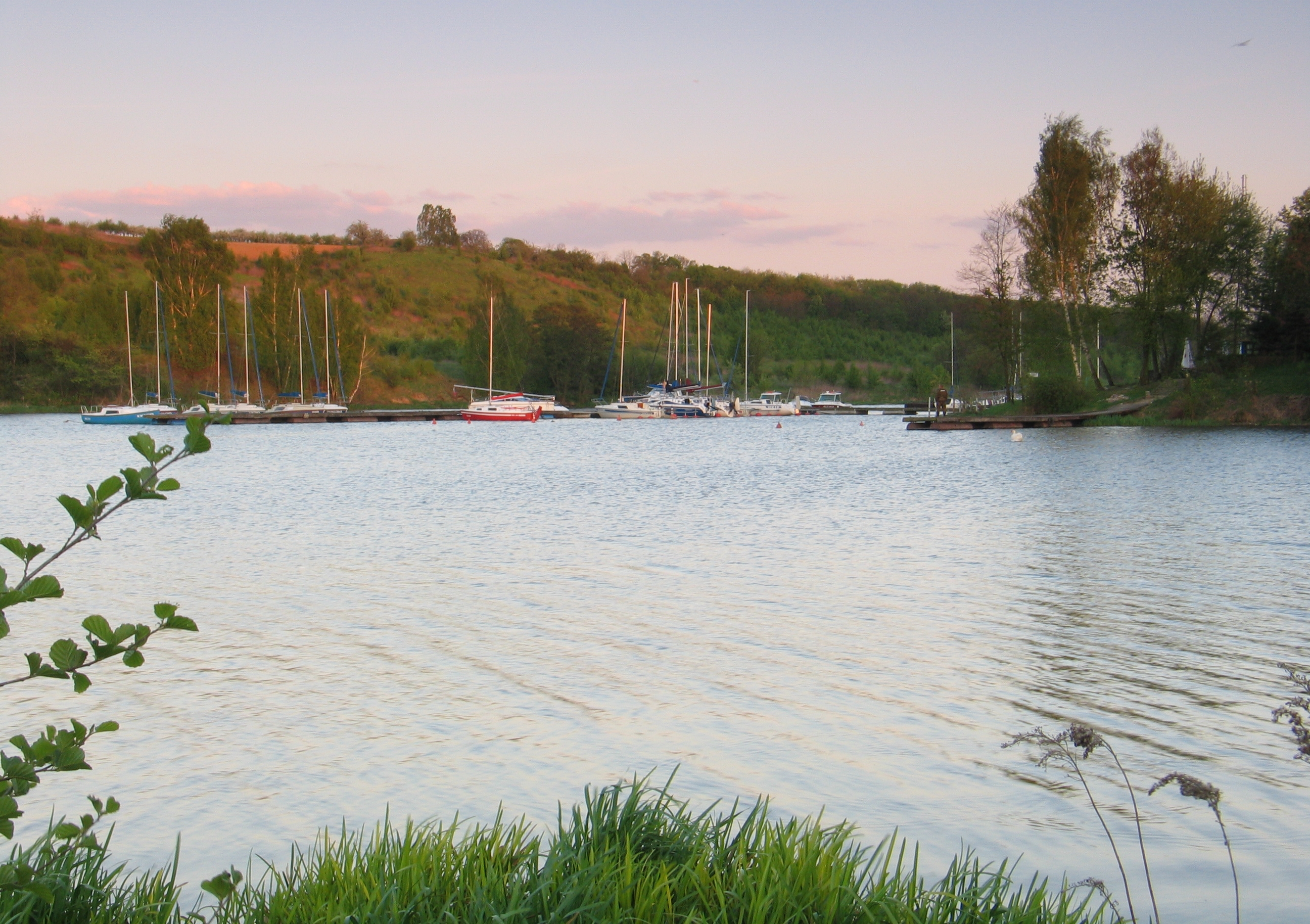
Zarzeczewo Marina

The Zarzeczewo Marina - a sailing port in Włocławek on the right bank of the Vistula River (Włocławek Reservoir; km 672.50), located in the Zawiśle district, in the Zarzeczewo neighbourhood, near the village of Zarzeczewo. The Chełmiczka River and the Święty Strumień stream escape into a small bay where the marina is located. Before the construction of the dam in Włocławek, a kilometre long clump of bushes stretched on the Vistula River at the height of Zarzeczewo. The bay in its present shape was created by the construction of the dam in Włocławek and the creation of the largest artificial lake in Poland.

An investment called "Marina in Zarzeczewo" was launched in 1973. A Water Sports Centre was formally opened as part of this project in 1975 (practically in 1976). A sailing section "Flauta", known in later years as Yacht Club Azoty and today as Yacht Club Anwil, was established at the Centre. Since 1977, YCA has been organising regular regattas, the most important of which is the "Blue Ribbon of the Włocławek Reservoir". More than 80 yachts and over 300 sailors usually participate in this annual event. The Zarzeczewo Marina also runs courses for the rank of sailor and skipper.
