= Building of the former Gdańsk Bank =

Coordinates: 52°39′26″N 19°04′18″E

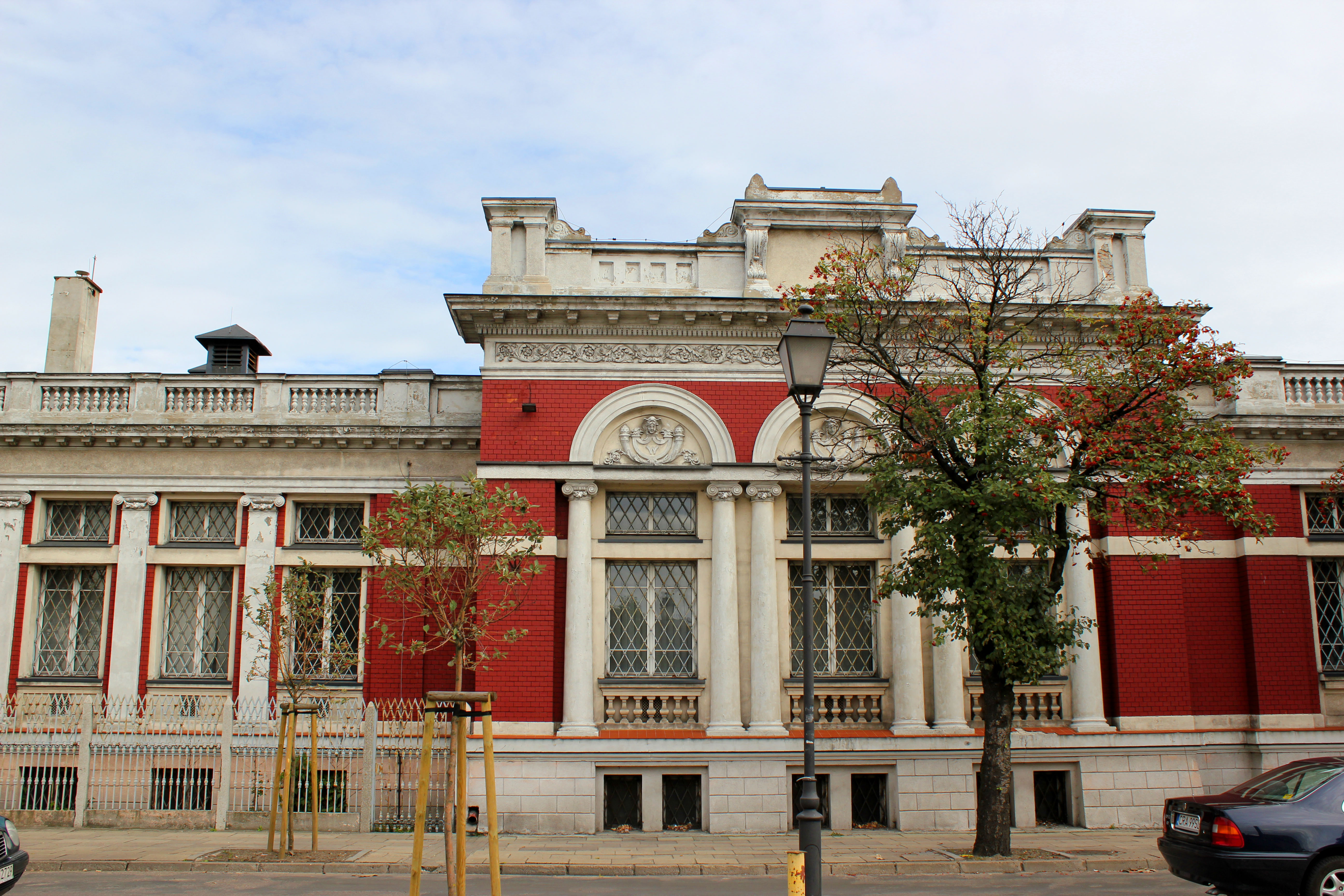
The building from Żabia Street

The building of the former Gdańsk Bank is a historic site in Włocławek, Poland. The building is located in Śródmieście district on the corner of Żabia and Królewiecka streets.

== History ==
The burgher house was built in 1911. It was designed by Warsaw-based architect Stanisław Paszkiewicz. The building was originally planned for use of Włocławek Credit Union. Ludwik Bauer was the chairman of the organisation at the time. The construction works were carried out by Leon Bojańczyk construction company from Włocławek. The architect, Antoni Olszakowski was supervising the whole project. The building served as headquarters of the Kujawski Bank in Włocławek from 1920. The building became a branch of Bank Gospodarstwa Krajowego in February 1928. In later years the building became a branch of the Gdańsk Bank.

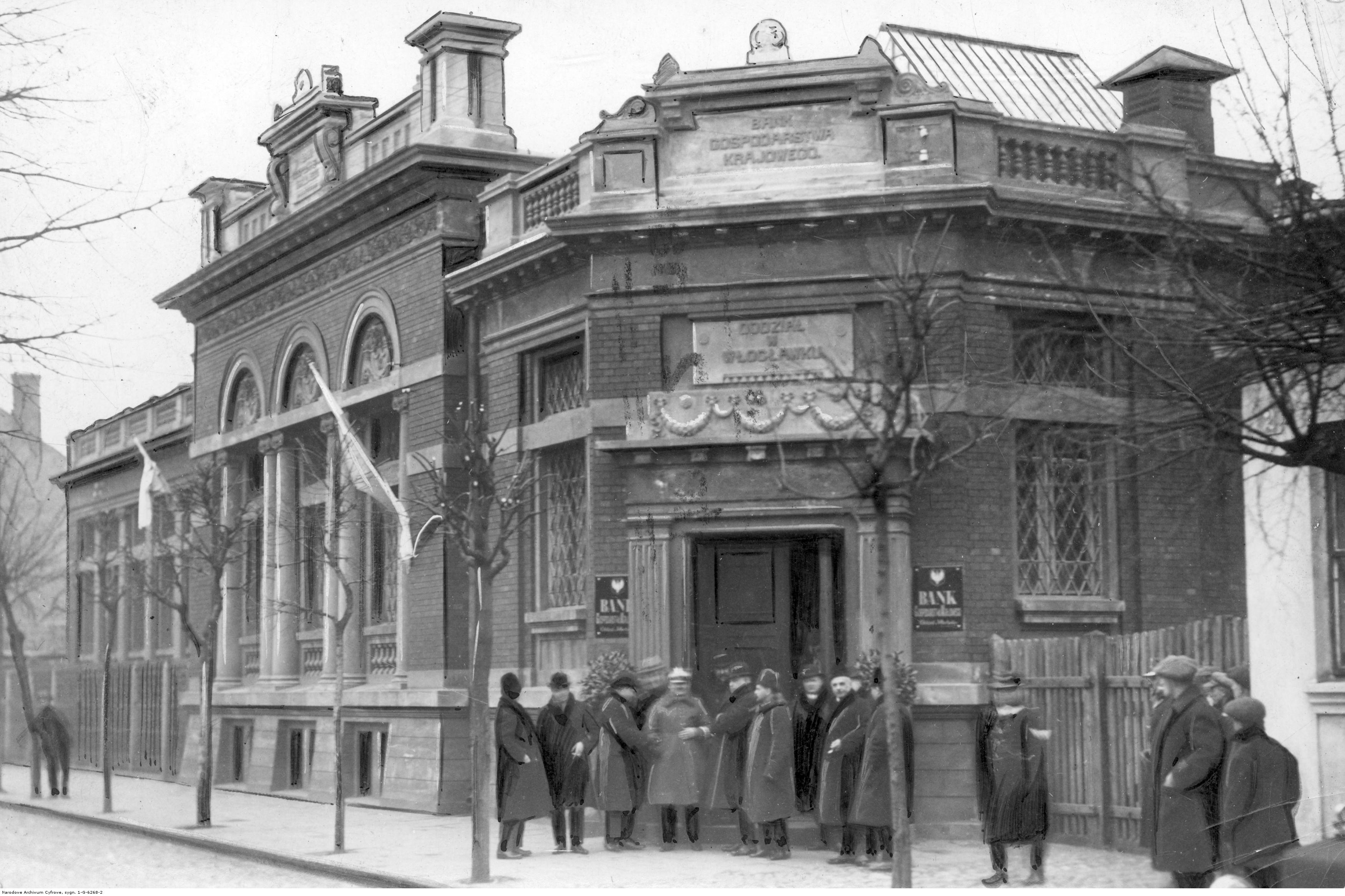
The opening of a branch of Bank Gospodarstwa Krajowego in Włocławek, 1928.

The building was purchased by the city administration on November 22, 2019. The building is to be renovated as a part of the municipal revitalization program for the years 2018–2028. It will be an interactive facility with the purpose of promoting local history and traditions.

== Architecture ==
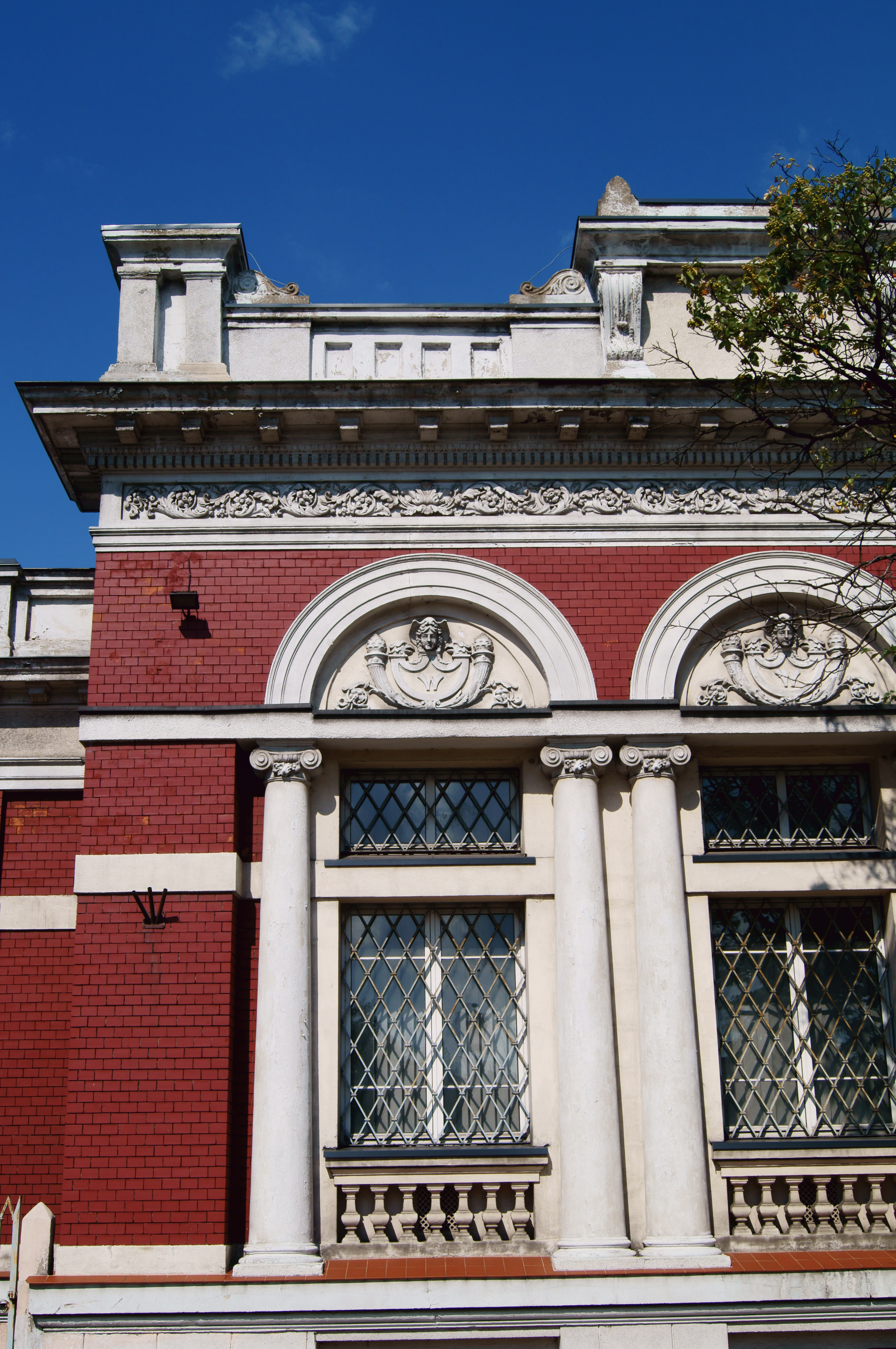
Letters integrated into the decorative elements of the building are visible above the windows.

It is a Renaissance house with a richly ornamented brick front facade and plaster architectural design. An impressive circular sales hall with rich stucco decoration and a skylight beautifully decorated with colourful stained-glass windows is particularly noteworthy, while in the newer part of the building the massive doors of the vault hidden in the basement are an interesting feature.
