= National Bank of Poland Building, Bydgoszcz =

National Bank of Poland building
- Polish: Budynek oddziału NBP w Bydgoszczy
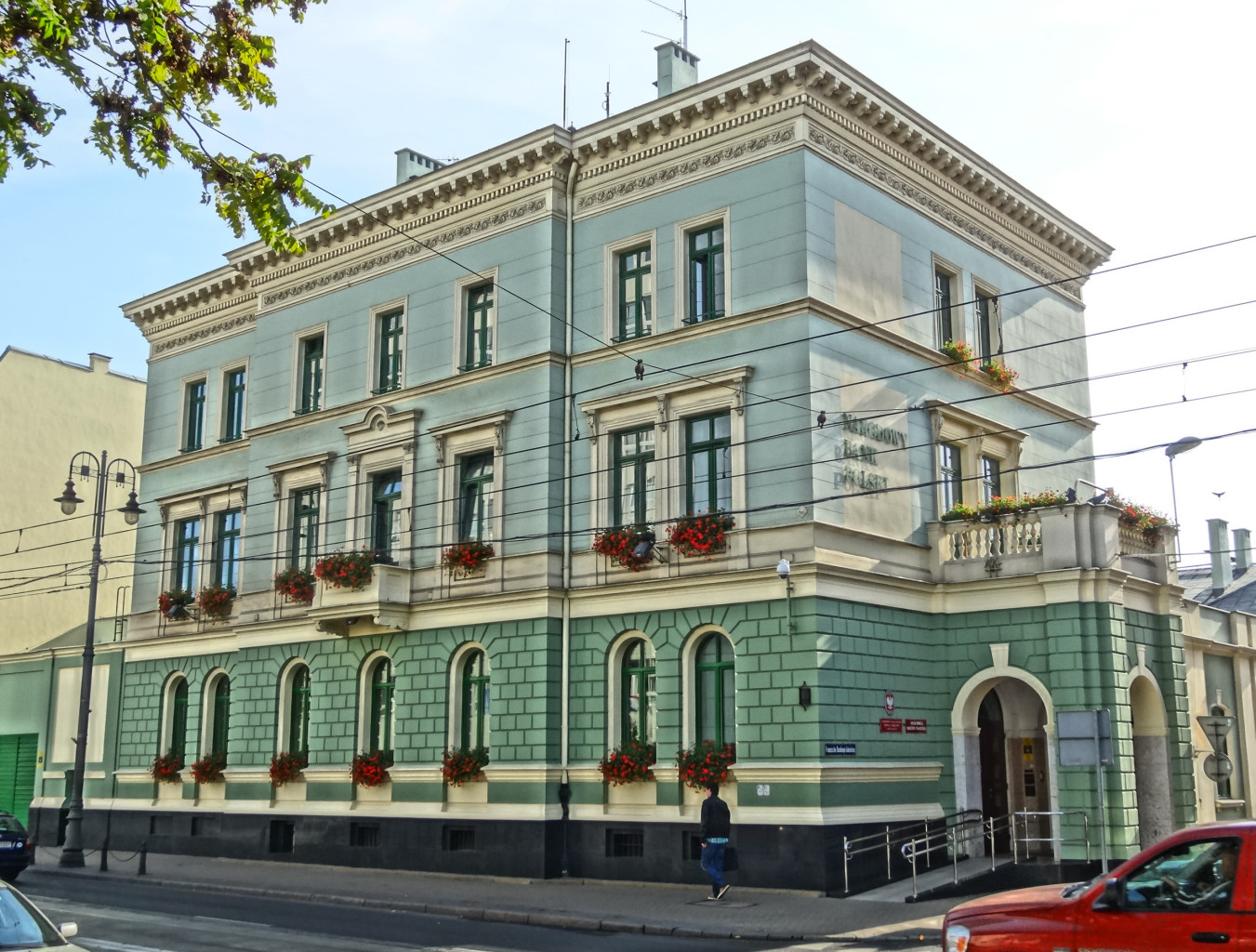
- View from Jagiellońska street

General information
- Type: Bank
- Architectural style: Neo-Renaissance
- Location: 8 Jagiellońska Street, Bydgoszcz, Poland
- Coordinates: 53°7′25″N 18°00′17″E
- Completed: 1864
- Renovated: 1911, 1925
- Client: National Bank of Poland

Technical details
- Floor count: 3

Design and construction
- Architect(s): Hermann Cuno

The building of the National Bank of Poland is a historical edifice, located at Jagiellońska street 8, in downtown Bydgoszcz, Poland.

== Location ==
The local seat of the National Bank of Poland is delimitated by the corner of Jagiellońska street on the north and Franciszek Ksawery Drucki-Lubecki street on the west.

== History ==
=== Prussian period ===
The building was erected in 1863-1864 for Bromberg's branch of Reichsbank in Berlin. It was the first public bank in the Kingdom of Prussia, founded on 17 June 1765 by Frederick the Great. The first building designed in Bydgoszcz as a first outpost of the Reichbank was located at Długa street 52. In August 1863, the construction of a new bank building started at Jagiellońska street 8, opposite the seat of the Prussian region. Site plans were designed by architect Hermann Cuno: he built a three-storey edifice (dimensions 20x12m), with high storeys. The construction was completed in September 1864. Aside bank premises were set habitation buildings for officials. On the ground floor were the operating room, the bank vault, and an anteroom with a connection to the hall. In the anteroom the money was packaged and collected daily by the treasurer. In the western part of the building was located a conference room, and a stairwell. On the first floor there was a flat for the bank manager consisting of 6 rooms, with a kitchen and chambers for domestic. The second floor housed the apartment of two other officials. Particular care was placed on building the vault, with all security measures available at the time such as reinforced walls, ceiling, windows and doors. The apartment located next to the vault was equipped with a contraption to record noises.

From 1875 on, the building housed a branch of the Royal Bank first, which then took the name of Reichsbank as the central German issuing bank. In 1911-1912, the architect Otto Muller built an additional wing on the east, with two floors, to function as a residential house.

=== Interwar period ===
At the end of 1916, was set up in Warsaw the "Polish National Fund for Loan" which worked to relieve the Reichsbank by issuing Polish marks and reduce the circulation of German marks in the governorship of Warsaw. On 11 November 1918 the institution passed into the hands of Polish authorities, who on 7 December declared it as the Polish state banking institution. On 26 January 1920 the former Reichsbank branch in Bydgoszcz had Tadeusz Piłatowskim, as its first director. In 1924, the "Polish National Fund for Loan" was replaced by the Polish Bank SA (Polish: Bank Polski Spółka Akcyjna). In August 1923, the bank building was expanded along Jagiellońska street on a design by Zdzislaw Mączeński from Warsaw. The new hall communicated with the old building through a newly built corridor stretching parallel to Franciszek Ksawery Drucki-Lubecki street. The work was completed by 15 December 1924. The new Palladian architecture features have been well matched to the original building in a successful architectural fusion.

During Second Polish Republic, the Bydgoszcz branch of the National Bank was one of the major centers in the country, making Bydgoszcz one of the most important focus of Polish banking network.

=== WWII period ===
During World War II, Polish Bank activities have been interrupted. Initially, gold reserve was evacuated to Paris and then to London, where it remained until the end of the war. In Bydgoszcz, the building housed a branch of Reichsbank, which was evacuated in January 1945 to Germany.

=== Post war period ===
On 15 January 1945, in place of the "Polish Bank SA" -liquidated- was established the National Bank of Poland (NBP), which Bydgoszcz branch had its seat in the building at Jagiellońska street 8. An upgrade of the facility happened in the years 1964-1967, with renovations of the interiors.

As a result of a reorganization, a second branch of the National Bank of Poland in Bydgoszcz was established in 1951, a third was created in 1954, located at 4 Jagiellońska street. After another banking system reform in 1969, the NBP seat in Bydgoszcz took the role of controlling and financing (at national scale), various activities: small trade, industry, public utilities and housing. 1989 reform shifted National Bank of Poland's position back as a central bank, while the market was opening to commercial banks.

Since the administrative reform of 1999, the current building houses the branch of the NBP for Kuyavian-Pomeranian Voivodeship. In 1997-1999 and 2001-2003, a comprehensive overhaul of the edifice has been performed.

== Architecture ==
The complex of buildings of NBP in Bydgoszcz has Neo-Renaissance features. It has bossage points on the ground floor. The main portal is decorated with pilasters, and the whole building is topped with a wide frieze and a cornice with classicist and Renaissance details.

The interior is decorated with frescoes. The style of the building refers to Italian Renaissance palaces characteristics.

== Gallery ==
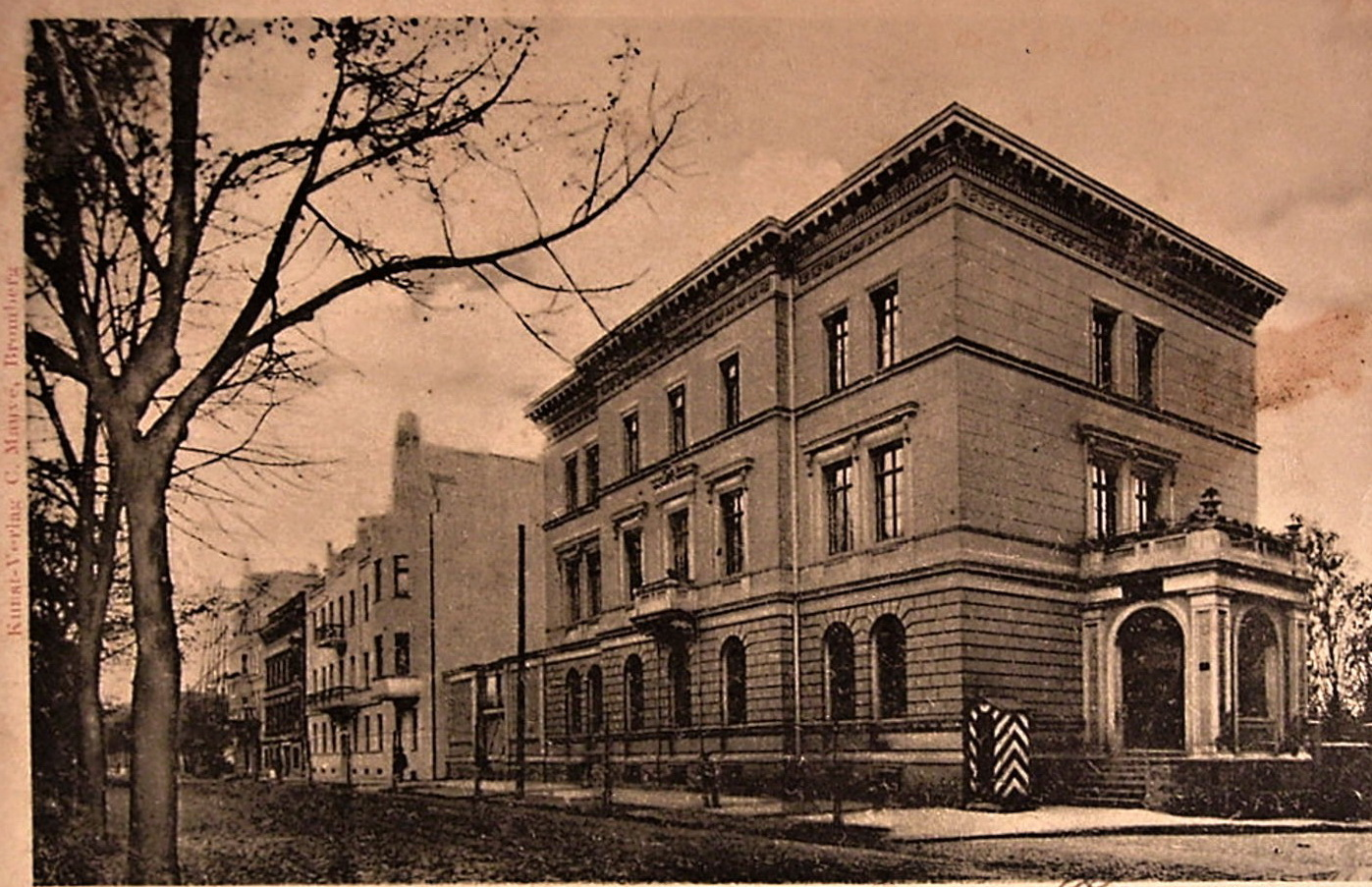
Reichbank building ca 1901

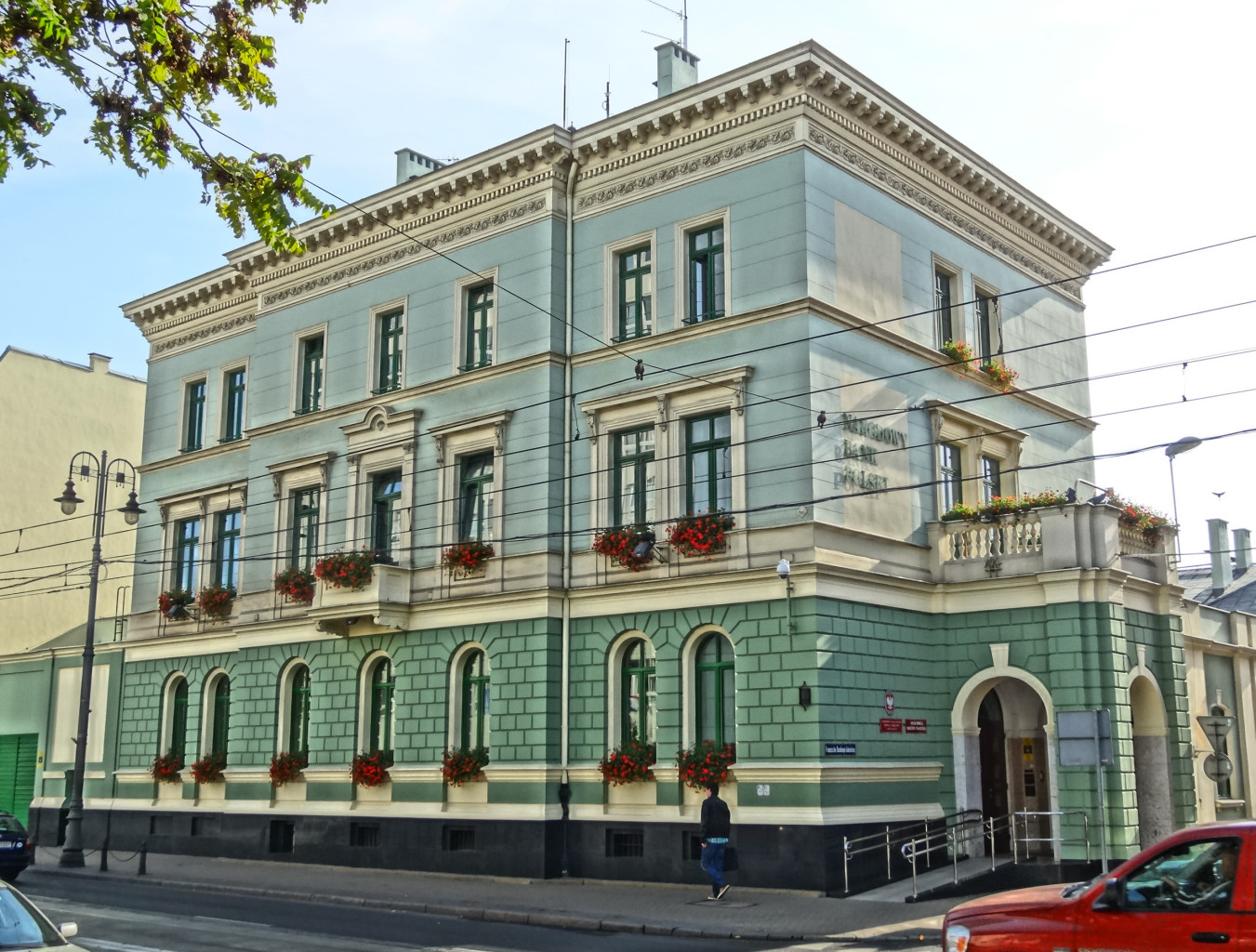
View from Jagiellońska street

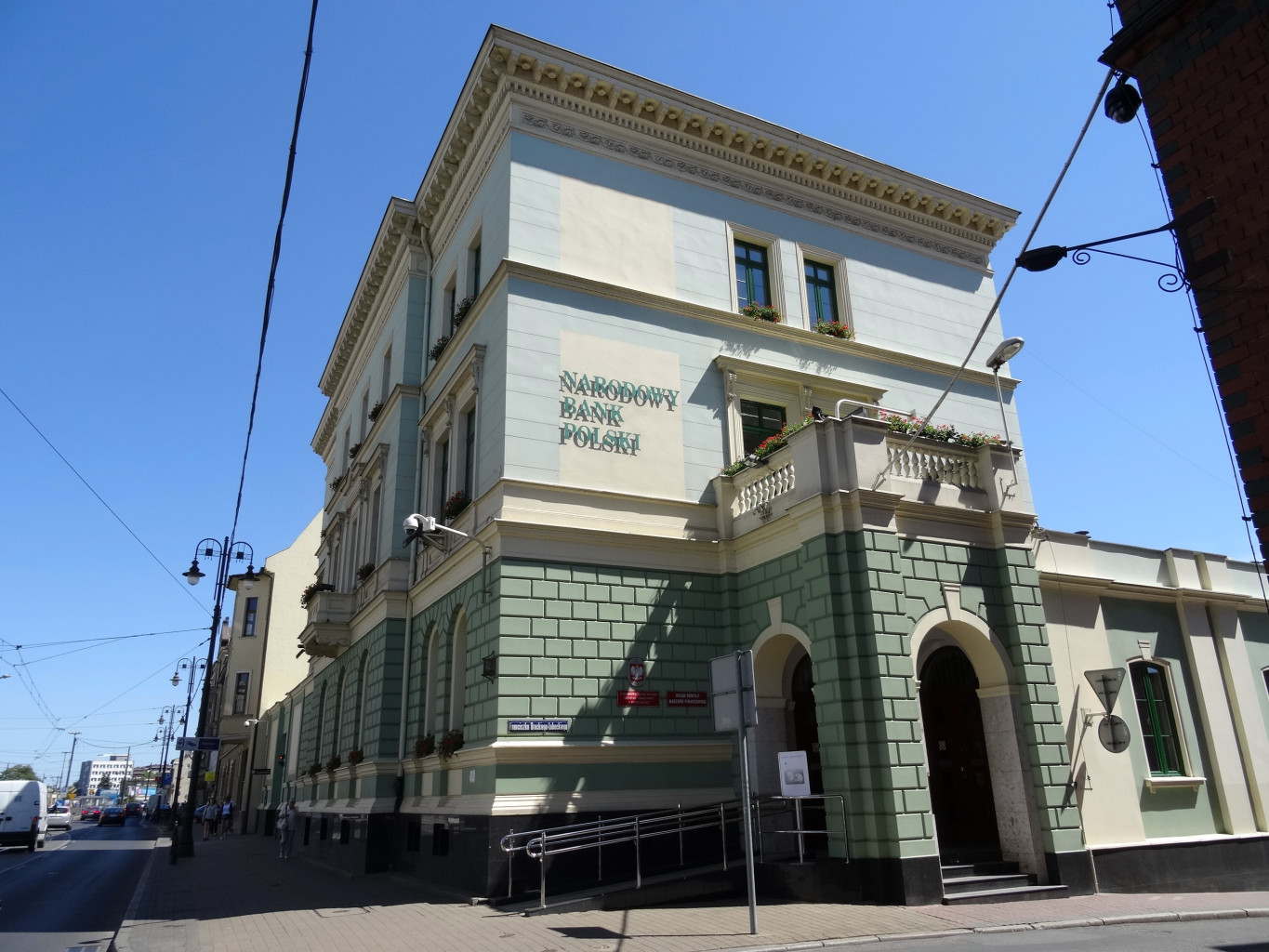
View from Franciszek Ksawery Drucki-Lubecki street

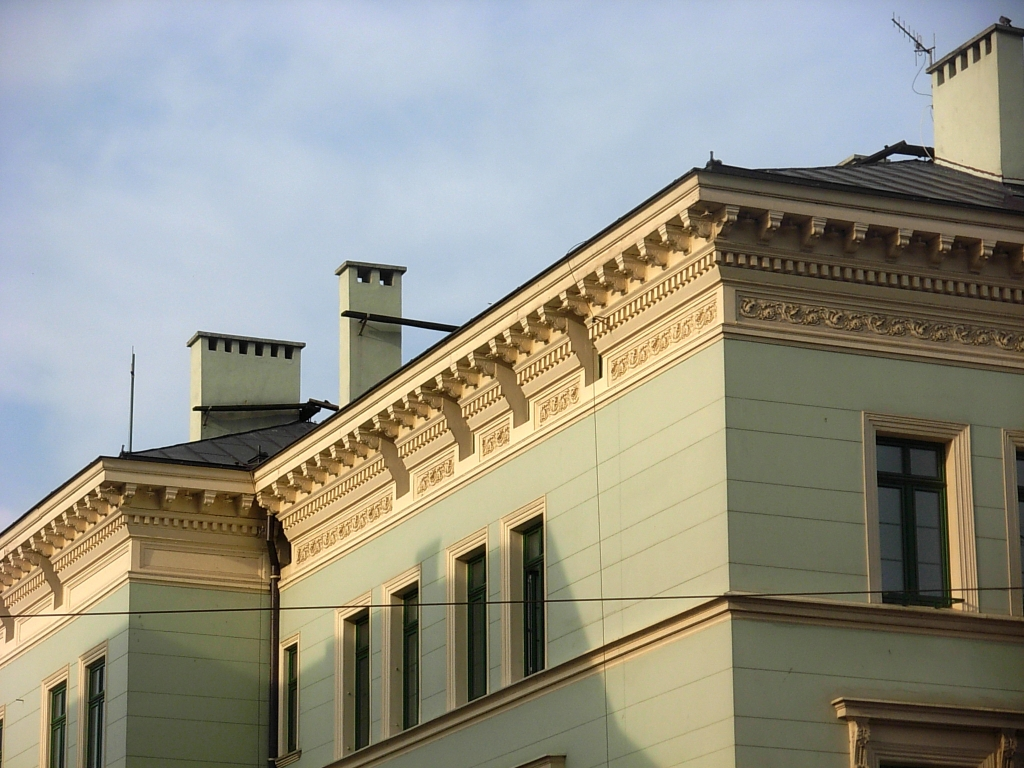
Friezes and cornice on the roof

== See also ==
- Bydgoszcz
- Jagiellońska street in Bydgoszcz
- Gdańska Street, Bydgoszcz
- Stary Port Street in Bydgoszcz
- Brda river

== Bibliography ==
- (in Polish) Maria Bręczewska-Kulesza, Agnieszka Wysocka (2007). Historia i architektura gmachu NBP w Bydgoszczy. Kalendarz Bydgoski. Bydgoszcz: Towarzystwo Miłośników Miasta Bydgoszczy.
- (in Polish) Garbaczewski, Witold (2004). Narodowy Bank Polski Oddział Okręgowy w Bydgoszczy – historia i współczesność. Kalendarz Bydgoski. Bydgoszcz: Towarzystwo Miłośników Miasta Bydgoszczy.
