= Jerzy Bojańczyk's Brewery =

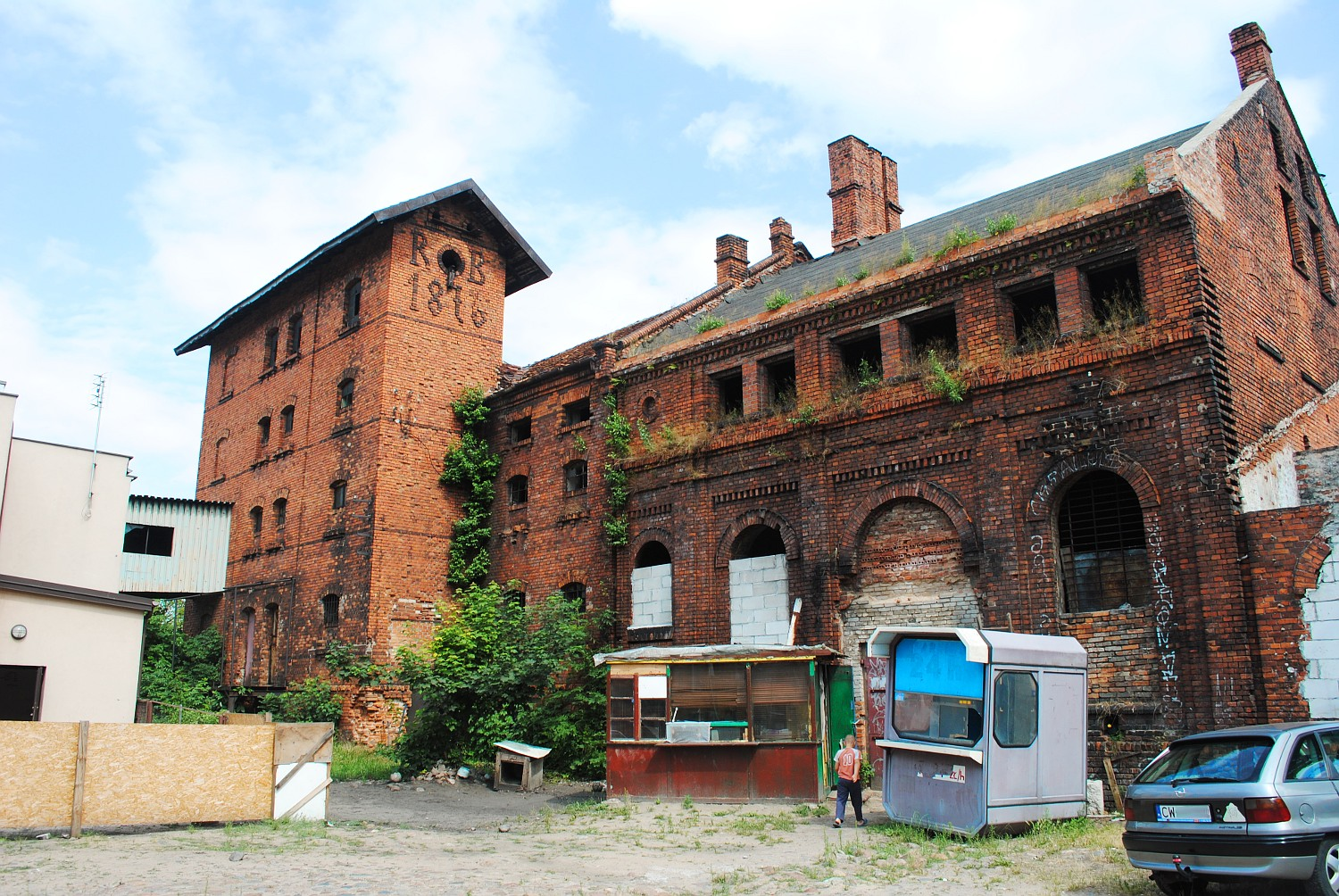
Warehouse No. 1 and 2.

The Jerzy Bojańczyk's Brewery in Włocławek - an industrial site of the 19th-century historic Bojańczyk Brewery, built from 1832 to 1880 in Włocławek. Consists of 5 buildings: the main building of the Brewery, three warehouses and the Administrator's building.

== History ==
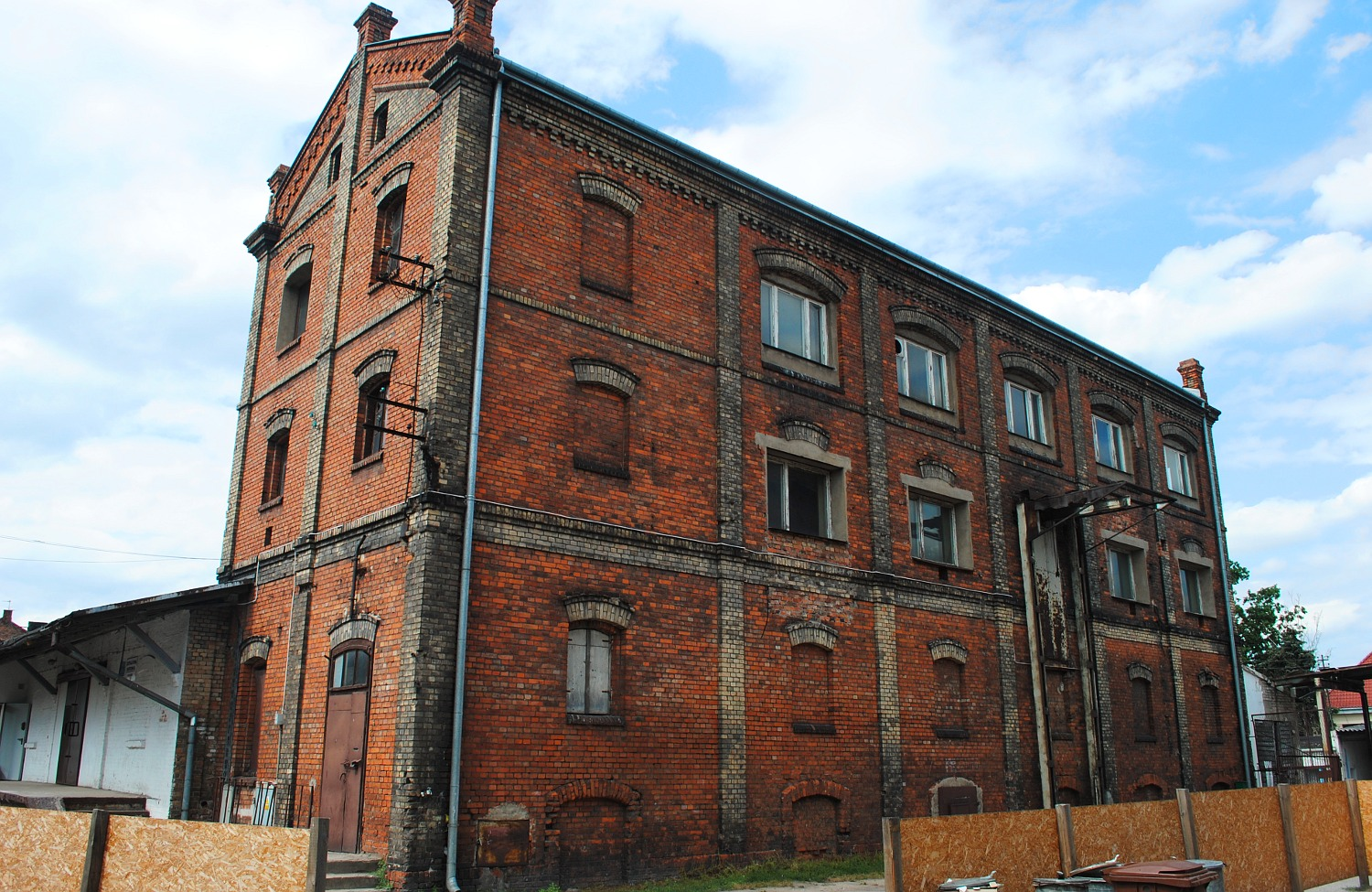
The main building

The Brewery was established by Kazimierz Bojanczyk in 1832. It originally produced vodka and later beer, producing several hundred barrels per year at the time. The Brewery was one of the biggest in the city of Włocławek. It remained in possession of the Bojańczyk family after the death of the founder Kazimierz Bojańczyk. Inherited first by Kazimierz's son Rafał, and later on by his grandson Wincenty. In 1866, when Rafał Bajończyk was the owner of the brewery, a bucket of beer cost 30 kopeks (Imperial Russian currency). The Brewery has expanded gradually, since the time it was established. The Main Building of the brewery was built first, in 1832. The complex expanded in 1878 when three warehouses were built. The Administrator's building was the last structure to be constructed, in 1880. The Bojańczyk family kept the brewery until the end of World War II. The Brewery kept changing ownership among members of the Bojańczyk family. Jerzy Bojańczyk managed the brewery until 1914. The World War I disrupted the development of the complex. Wincenty Bojańczyk, sold the whole site to a joint-stock company created by Wincent's son Jerzy. Annual production of beer in 1927 reached around 5600 hectoliters. After World War II, the brewery was nationalized and later closed. After the nationalization, the buildings were used as warehouses, fish distribution sites and a sewing factory.

== Buildings ==
The Brewerysite consists of 5 buildings of different sizes. All facilities were built between 1832 and 1880.

=== Main Brewery ===
The building was erected in 1832 by Kazimierz Bojańczyk as the first and the main building of the Brewery. The building is made of red burnt brick. The architectural values of the Brewery are diminished by a number of extensions and annexes, which do not, in any way, fit into the design of the building.

=== Warehouse No. 1. ===
Built in 1878. Like the main building of the Brewery, it is a four-storey building, made of red burnt brick. It is covered with a gable roof with ceramic tiles. There is an additional structure on the western side of the building meant for a staircase. Due to the utility needs of the building, the floors have different heights.

=== Warehouse No. 2. ===
Built in 1878. Warehouse building No. 2, listed in the register of monuments under No. 413/A of 12.06.1998, built of red brick, together with warehouse No. 3 and 1 forms a fragment of the frontage of Bechiego Street. The building has three floors with a partial basement, although the elevation presents two overground storeys. The building is topped with a gable roof on a wooden structure with two walls covered with asphalt roofing felt installed on planks.

=== Warehouse No. 3. ===
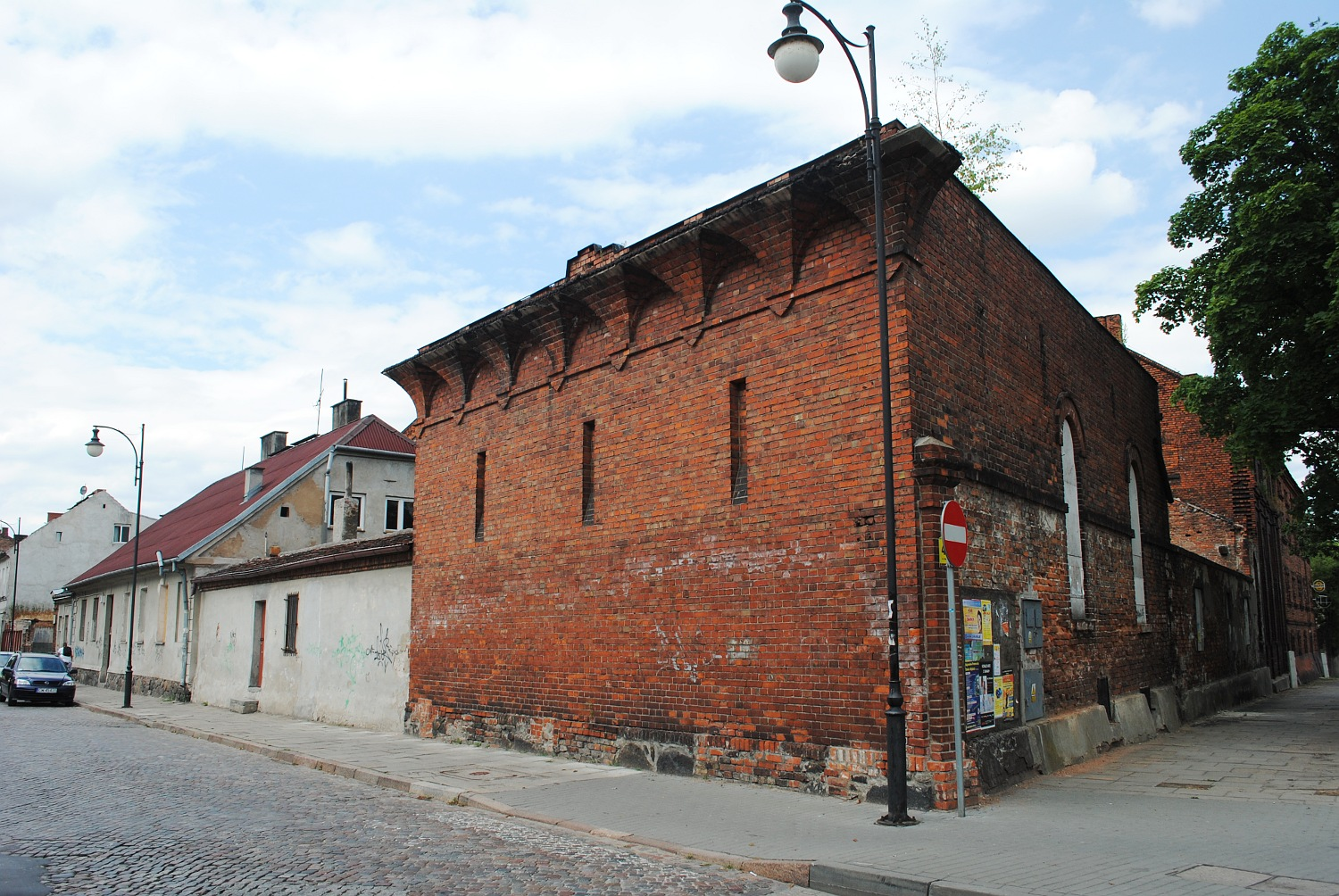
From the left: Administrator's building, Warehouse No. 3.

The building is located along Bechiego Street, towards Łęgska Street. It consists of three segments: the smallest - the first one from the Vistula, the middle one and the corner one. In the façade of the building from Łęgska Street, there is a frieze, unprecedented in any other Włocławek building, crowned with a canopy with a motif of a pointed arch, clearly referring to the neo-Gothic trend.

=== Administrator’s building ===
It is the only building designed to be used for residential purposes straight from the beginning and is still in use today. 7 families currently live here. The structural and spatial layout of the house is also typical for eighteenth-century buildings with a central supporting chimney wall and amphiladium rooms.

== Revitalisation ==
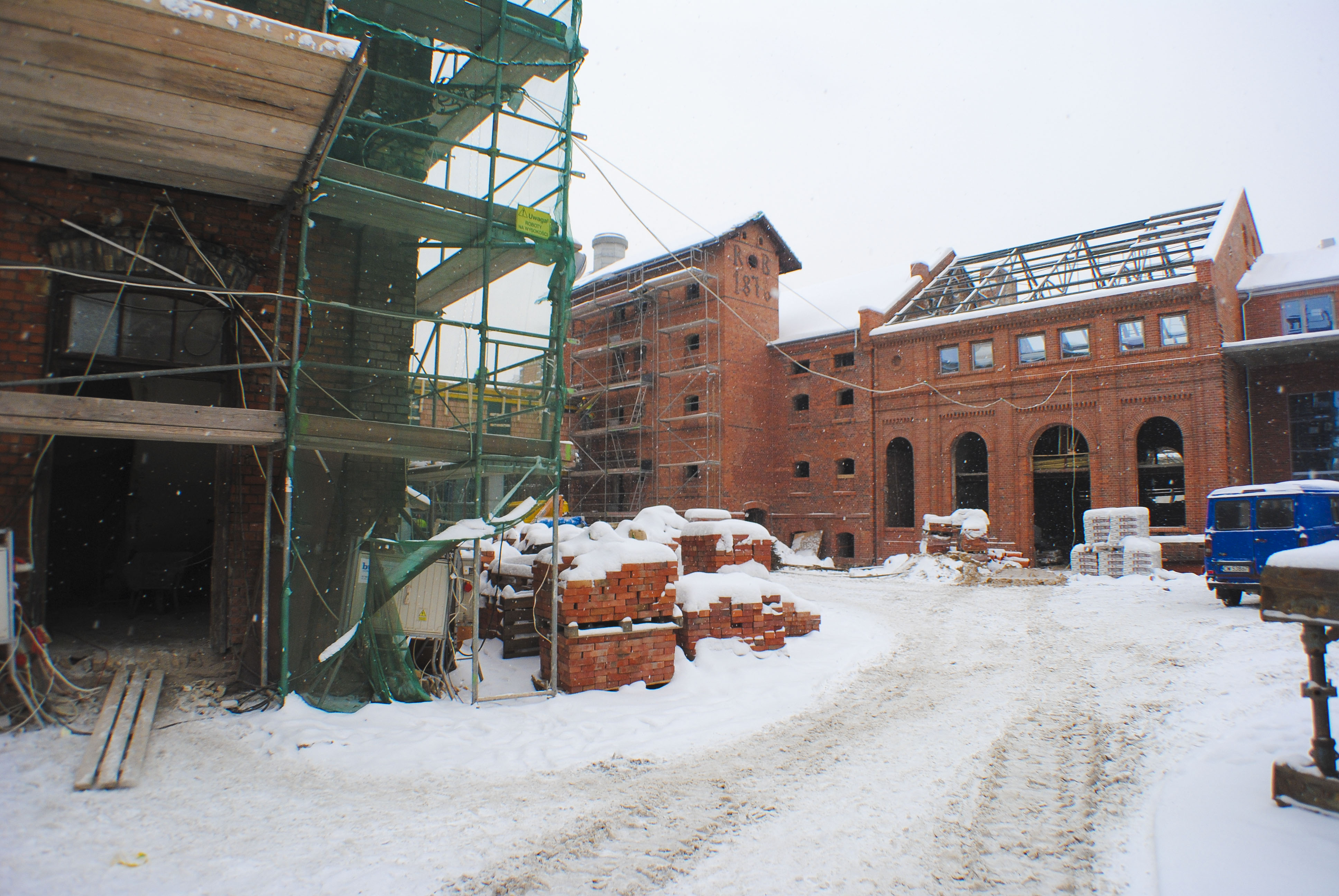
Construction work

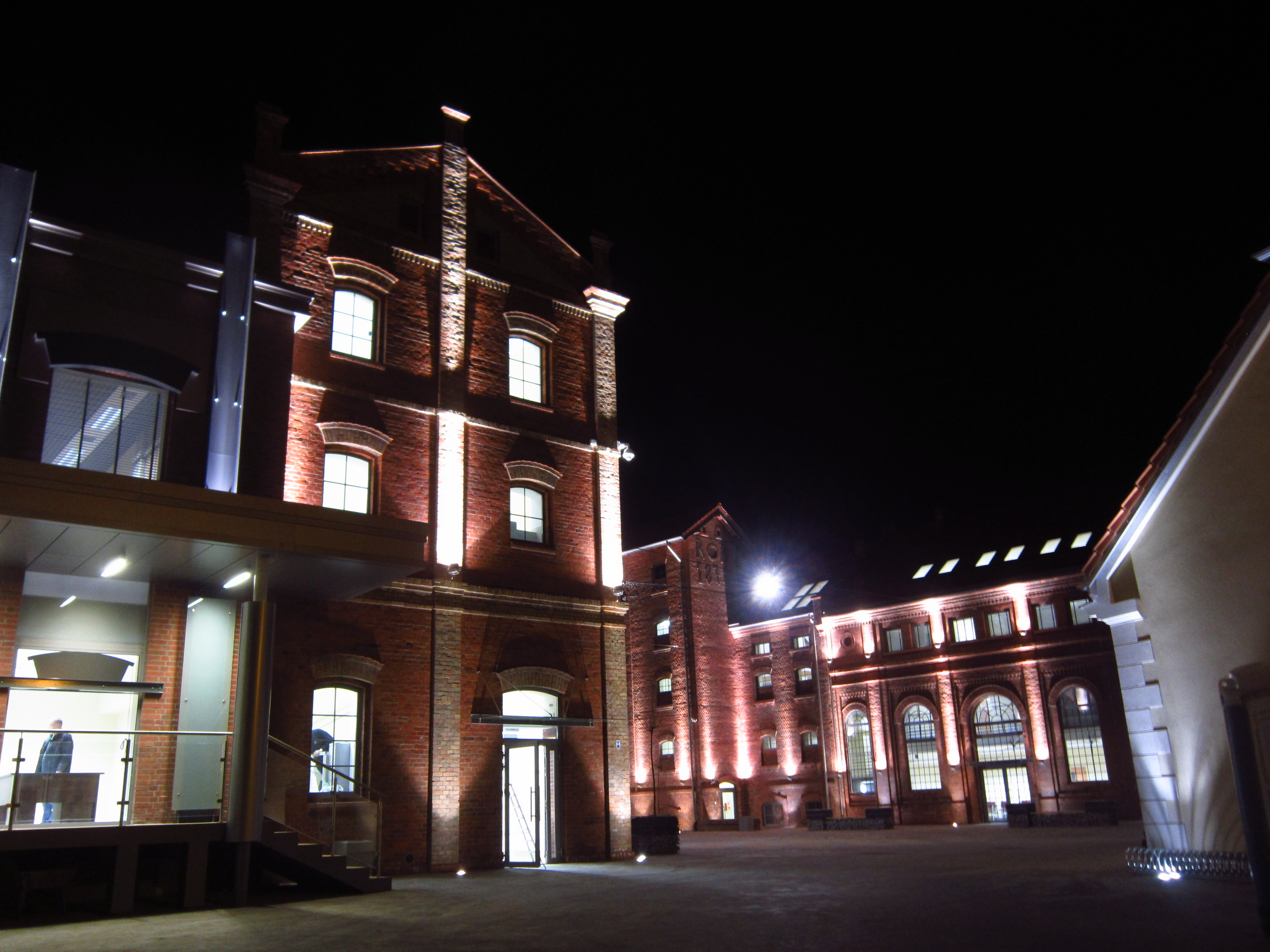
Illumination of the rebuilt Brewery

The revitalization of the historic buildings of the brewery has become one of the priorities of the Włocławek City Hall. The implementation of the project was delayed due to numerous problems. For a long time, the city had a problem with the expropriation of the last property comprising the entire complex (the local government was not the owner of the entire facility). The city decided to take over the private property legally acquired from the city in 2003 at 28 Łęgska Street, citing the repurchase right clause in the sales contract. The final decision on the ownership of the plot was made by the Court of Appeals in Gdańsk, which established the Włocławek local government as the owner of the property. The project to revitalise the site involves the demolition of some objects which are not of historical value. They will be replaced by new architecture reflecting the brick façades of historical buildings. The Brewery Culture Centre will be opened in its place after the completed reconstruction. The facilities will include numerous exhibition areas, teaching rooms, a large dance hall, an auditorium as well as conference and multifunctional rooms.

The centre will host, among other things, extracurricular activities for students from neighbouring schools. The facility will include computer and language training rooms. It will be an undertaking addressed to institutions, non-governmental organizations and associations which will be able to carry out their statutory activities in this field. The buildings will also contain rooms for dance, singing and photography classes as well as social meetings.

On December 30, 2011, in the Włocławek City Hall, after the tender procedure, a contract was signed with the contractor, the Molewski company from Chodecz. The value of the project was 37 million 547 thousand PLN, and the deadline for completion of the works, specified in the agreement, was 30 September 2013. The investment is covered by funding from the European Regional Development Fund as part of the Kujawsko-Pomorskie Regional Operational Programme for 2007–2013, which is 18 million 469 thousand zlotys.
