= Church of St. John the Baptist in Gniezno =

St. John the Baptist Parish
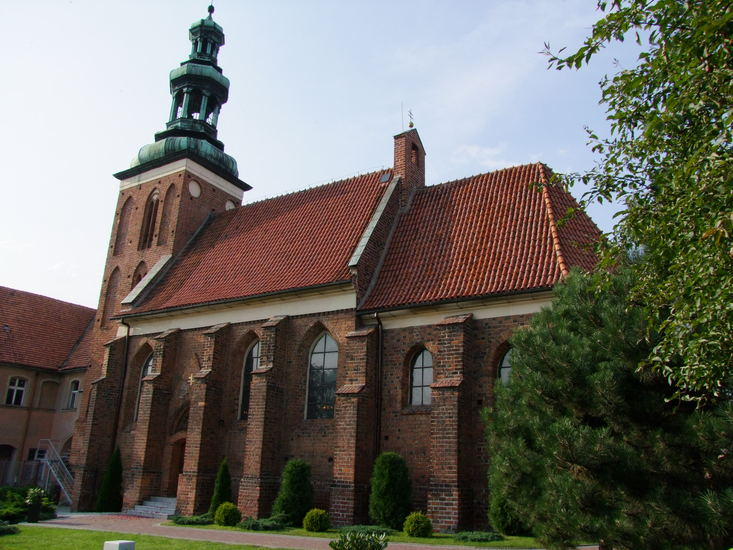
- St. John the Baptist Parish
- 52°32′17″N 17°35′51″E
- Location: Gniezno
- Country: Poland
- Denomination: Roman Catholic

History
- Founded: 1331
- Founder: Order of the Holy Sepulchre
- Dedication: St. John the Baptist
- Dedicated: 1331
- Consecrated: 1333

Administration
- Province: Archdiocese of Gniezno
- Archdiocese: Archdiocese of Gniezno

Clergy
- Archbishop: Archbishop Wojciech Polak
- Rector: Rev. Monsignore Kazimierz Kociński
- Pastor: No pastor

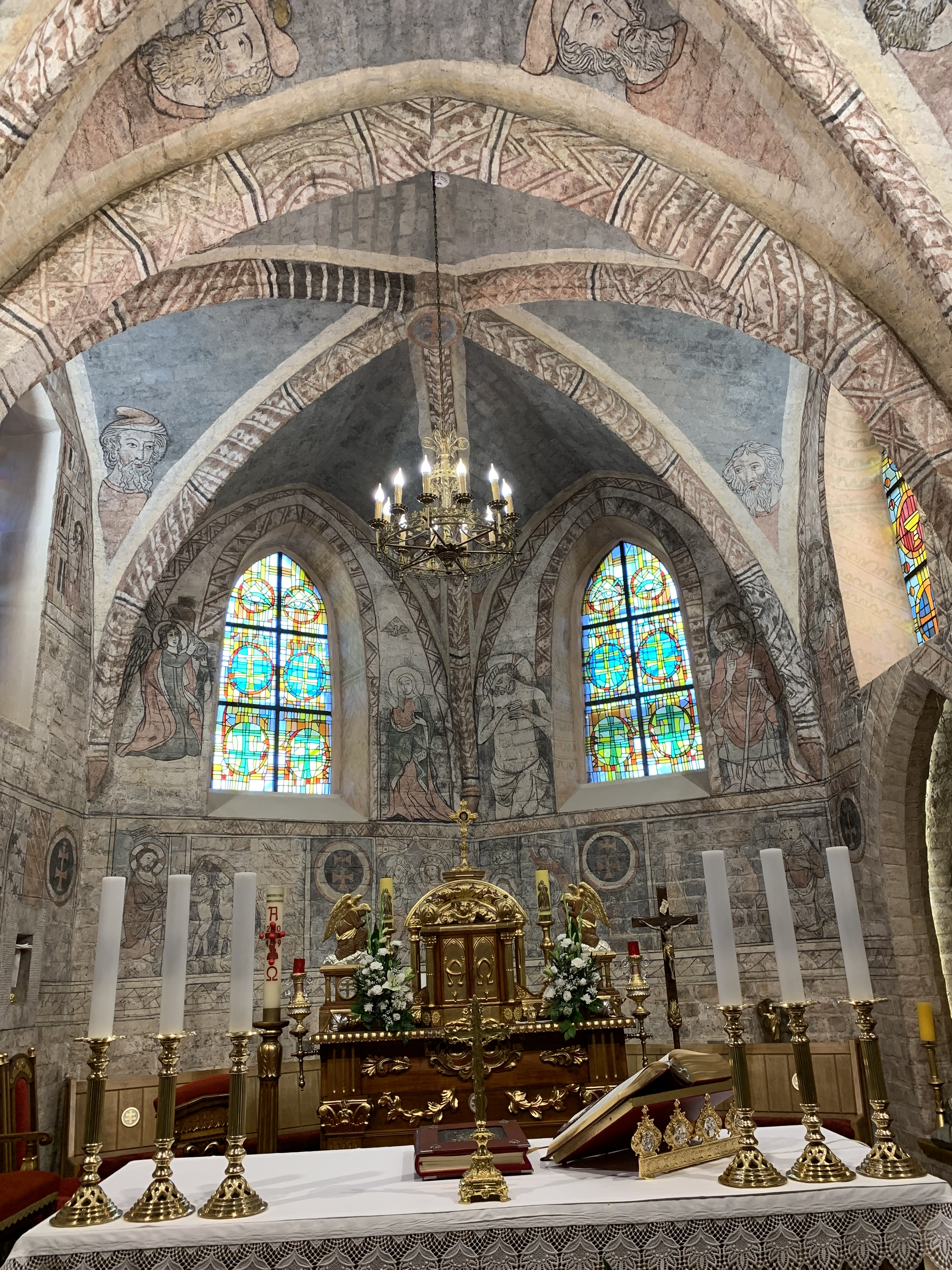
Presbytery of the church

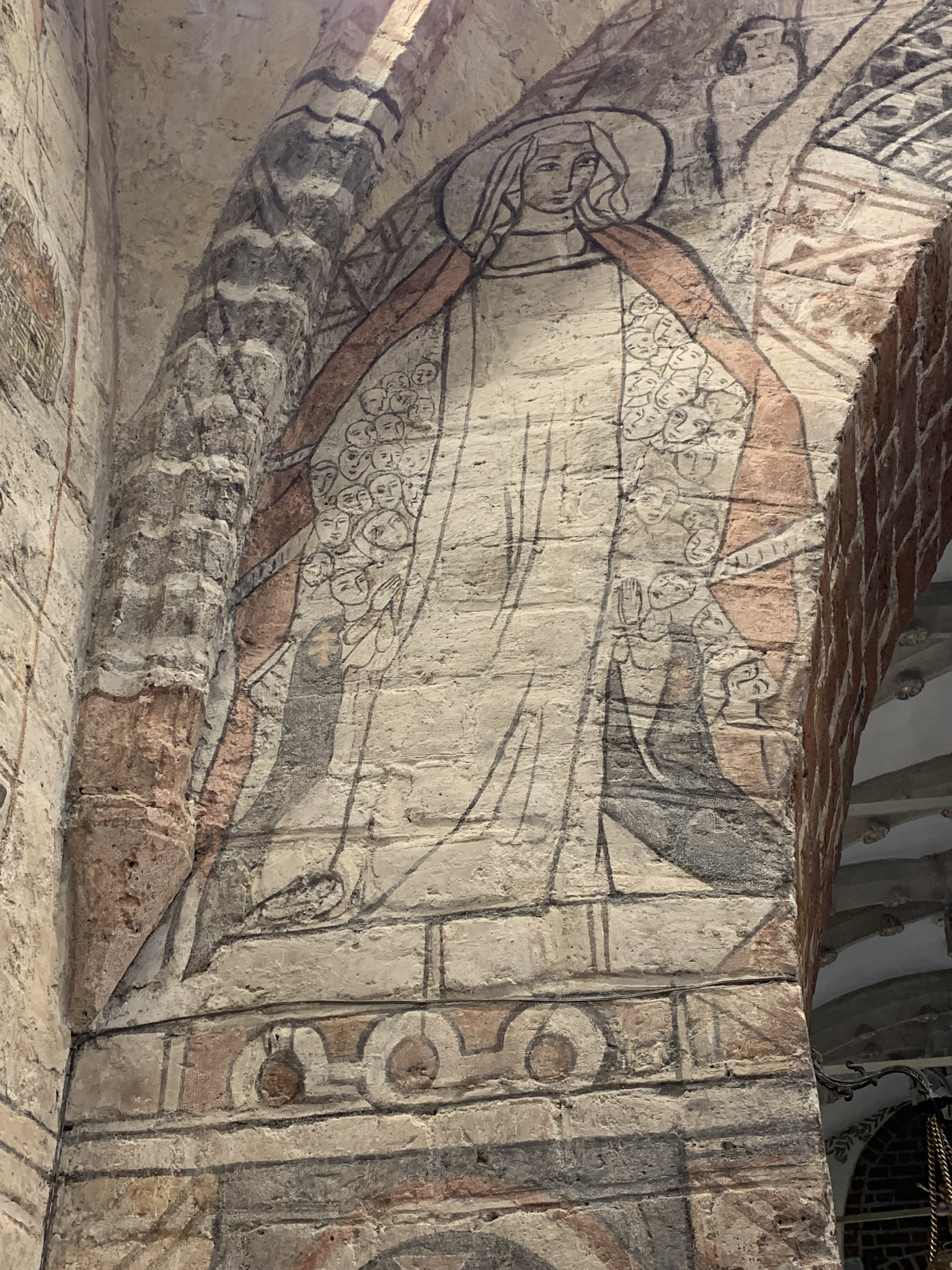
Mother of Mercy

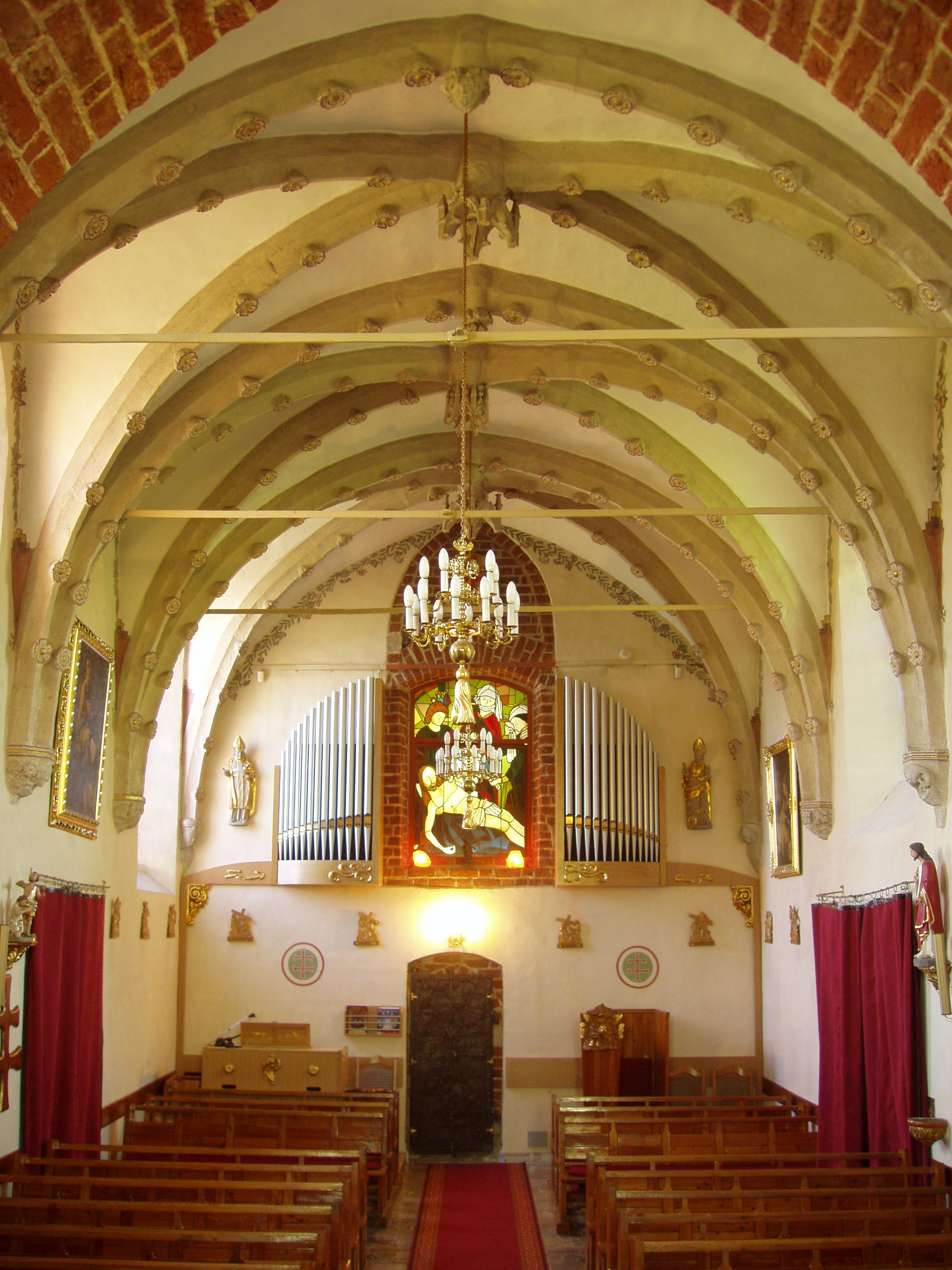
Nave of the Church

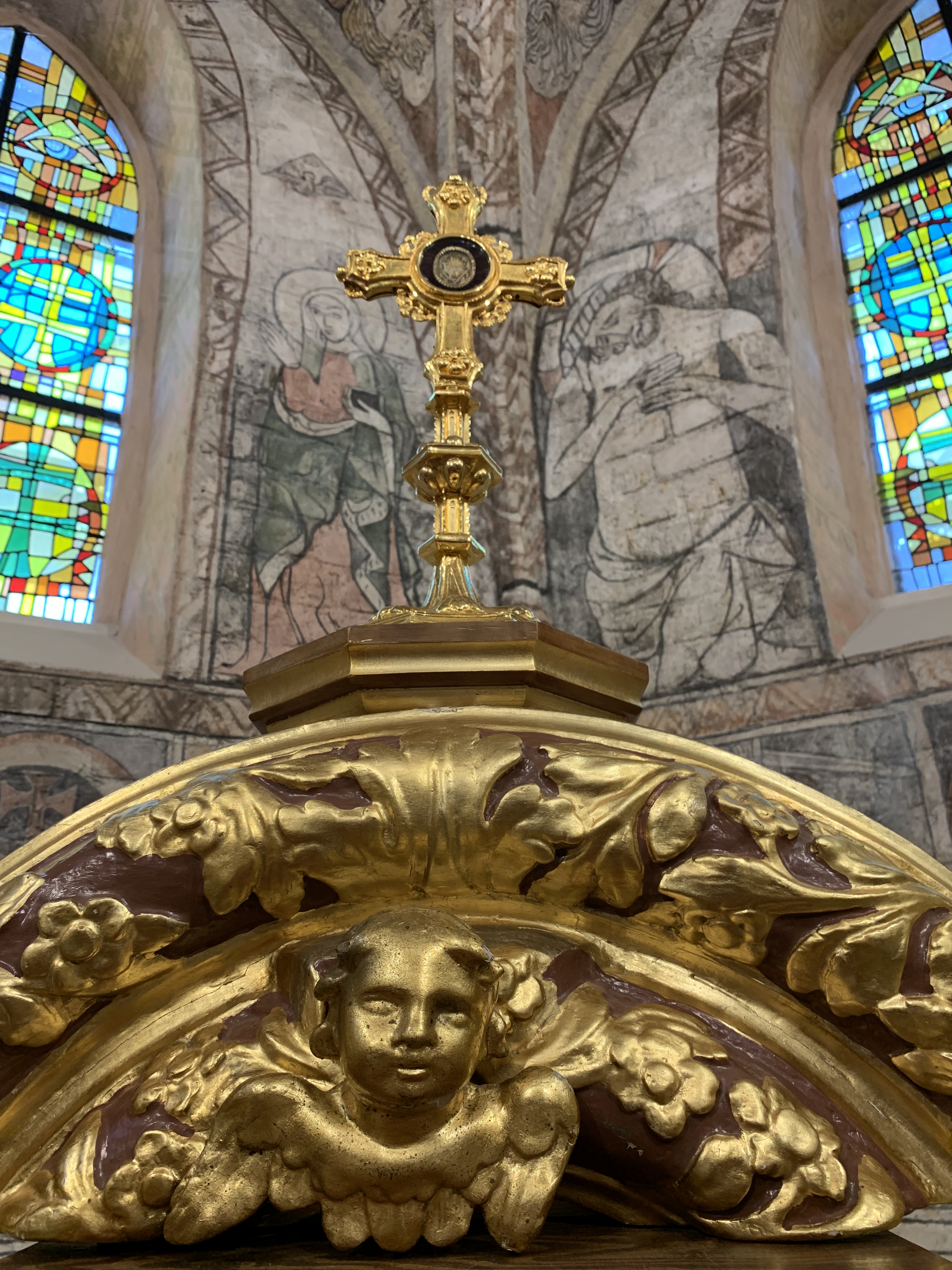
John the Baptist reliquary

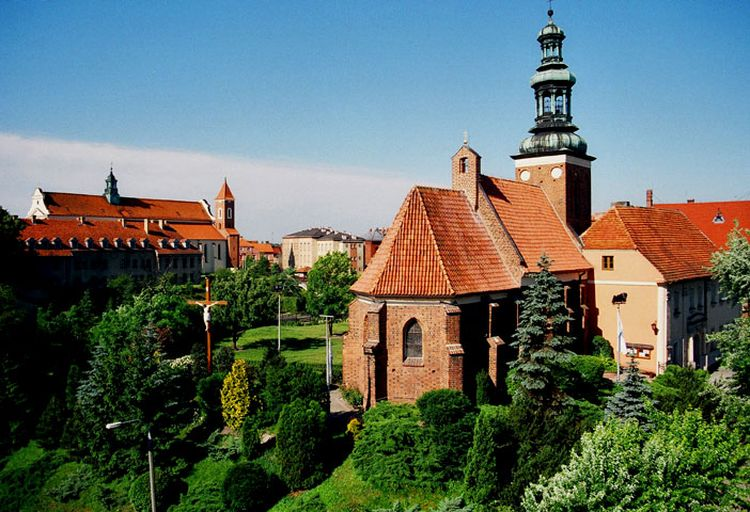
Church with the Monastery

The Church of St. John the Baptist is a monument in Gniezno, Poland. It was the headquarters of Order of the Holy Sepulchre for centuries. Its presbytery houses the original 14th-century polychromy made with fresco-secco technique.

Order of the Holy Sepulchre arrived in Poznań from Miechowo in the second half of the 12th century. Over 70 years later, Przemysł I and Bolesław the Pious founded the monastery and church in the suburbs of Gniezno. Monastics lived here until the dissolution by Prussian authorities.

== Architecture ==
Saint John the Baptist Church, is the oldest and best preserved monument of Polish Gothic, sacred architecture. The church was erected by the Order of the Guardians of the Holy Sepulchre, who arrived to Gniezno from Miechów. Its site provides a view over the former Hill of Teutonic Knights. The church was built in 1331.

St. John's Church is a one nave, extended, gothic building which was built of brick according to the Polish scheme of building. However, its presbytery is narrow.

The presbytery, east oriented, is a little older than the nave (dating from the 14th century), and it has two cross vault bays. In each bay where the fins cross, there is a round, evenly carved keystone; one with a smoot coat of arms, another with a double cross symbolic of the Holy Sepulcher order. In the bay closer to the nave on its opposite walls you can notice some semicircular niches divided by three ogival arcades, once used by the monks as their seats (sedilla). There is a niche vaulted with a gothic arch in the second bay, placed in the southern wall. Opposite in the northern wall, a niche for a tabernacle with new-stone setting can be observed.

The wall paintings in the presbytery are gothic polychrome dating from the second half of the 14th century. They were painted on a thin layer of whitewash with the use of “al secco” technique. The polychrome paintings accentuate the architecture by emphasizing the constructional elements, as well as framing the niches and windows with geometrical ornament, which frames the area for the numerous figural compositions on the walls, which follow a zonal pattern. Two tiers are covered with scenes from the lives of Christ, God's Mother, St. John the Baptist and figures of Saints. On the wall of the rood screen arch we can admire Mother of Mercy, who covers the inhabitants of the town and Monks of the Holy Sepulcher Order with her coat, as well as St. Christopher. The vault areas with their plain surface, framed with yellow strips along its fins, make a good background for 18 heads of kings and Old Testament prophets, supernatural in size, set on their busts.

== Nave ==
The nave was erected in second half of 14th century. Its constructional elements (fins, keystones, cantilevers, window frames) were made of artificial stone. It is a bit higher and wider than the presbytery and has four bays. From the western side there is a quadrilateral tower with a sacristy in the ground floor.

== Bell Tower ==
The quadrilateral tower – There is small circular window with stone four–leaf open work on the northern part of its ground floor. We can see windows and round or ogival blind windows on the other tiers as well. The tower has a baroque dome made from copperplate (1666) and two lanterns are attached to it. There is a ridge roof on the top covered with Roman tiles.

== Convent (Old Monastery) ==
The convent adjacent to the church was built of bricks and plastered and its structure is partly gothic. The building is two stories high with a basement below. It was built in the gothic style, however later some baroque decorations were added. On the first floor there is a passage which joins the convent and the church. The convent was partly rebuilt at the end of 17th century.

== Current times ==
The paintings were restored in 2019. The monastery is private property and receives no funding from the diocese.

== Links - Online tour ==
- Multimedialna wycieczka po wnętrzu kościoła
