= Michał Powałowski =

Polish politician and educator (born 1971)

Mayor of Gniezno
- Incumbent
- Assumed office 6 May 2024
- Preceded by: Tomasz Budasz

Deputy mayor of Gniezno
- In office 5 December 2014 – 6 May 2024 Serving with Jarosław Grobelny (until 2022) and Joanna Śmigielska (since 2022)
- Preceded by: Czesław Kruczek; Rafał Spachacz
- Succeeded by: Łukasz Muciok

Personal details
- Born: 18 July 1971 Poznań, Poland
- Party: Civic Coalition (since 2025)
- Other political affiliations: Civic Platform (until 2025)
- Education: Casimir the Great University
- Occupation: Politician, educator

Michał Powałowski (Polish: [ˈmi.xaw pɔ.vaˈwɔf.ski]; born 18 July 1971) is a Polish politician and educator. Since 2024, he has been the mayor of the city of Gniezno in Greater Poland Voivodeship, Poland. Previously, Powałowski served as its deputy mayor from 2014 to 2024. Prior to his political career, he was a schoolteacher and lecturer. Powałowski is a member of the Civic Coalition party.

== Biography ==
Michał Powałowski was born on 18 July 1971 in the city of Poznań, located in Greater Poland Voivodeship, Poland. He graduated from the Faculty of Mathematics and Technology of the Higher Pedagogical School in Bydgoszcz (now known as the Casimir the Great University), and received postgraduate degrees in educational information technology and educational management. Powałowski worked as a schoolteacher for over 20 years and was a deputy head teacher of an intermediate school in Gniezno from 2001 to 2014. Beginning in 2001, he was also a lecturer at the Millennium Higher School of Gniezno.

Powałowski was a member of the Civic Platform party. He was a part-time member of the Board of Gniezno County in Greater Poland Voivodeship. In 2014, Powałowski became a deputy mayor of the city of Gniezno, serving under Tomasz Budasz. In the 2024 election, he successfully run for office of the mayor of Gniezno, receiving 13,965 votes (61.65%). Powałowski run from an electoral list Coalition for the First Capital. He was appointed to the office on 6 May 2024. In 2025, the Civic Platform was merged with other parties, forming the Civic Coalition.

== Personal life ==
Powałowski has a wife and a daughter. He recreationally plays handball and field hockey, and belongs to the Polish Scouting and Guiding Association.

== Electoral results ==
Year	Office		Party	Constituency	Votes			Result	Ref.
Year	Office		Party	Constituency	Total	%	P.	Result	Ref.
2024	Mayor of Gniezno	12th	Electors' Electoral Committee; Coalition for the First Capital	—N/a	13,965	61.65	1st	Won	
