= Church of St. George, Gniezno =

Church in Gniezno, Poland

Church of St. George
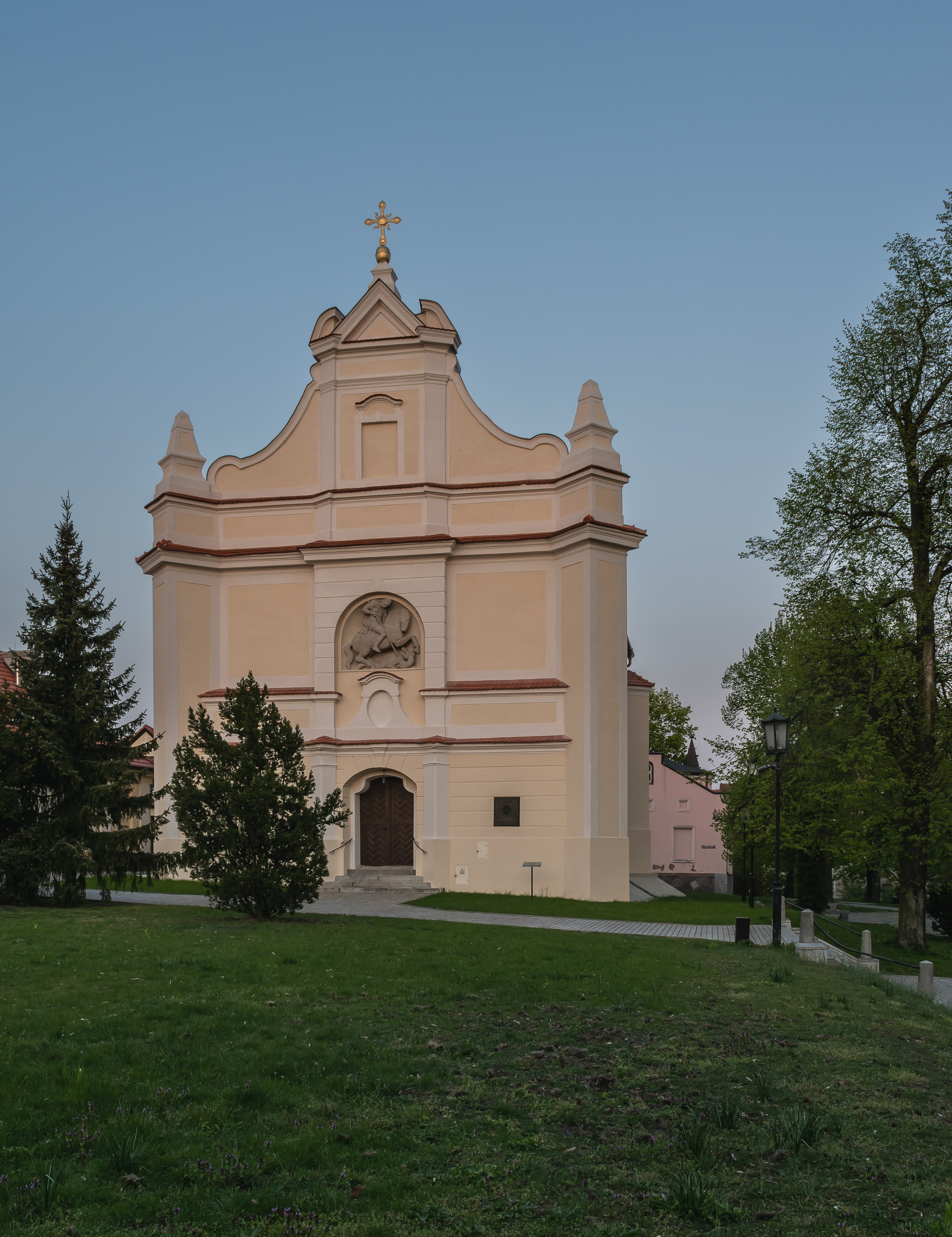
- Church of St. George
- 52°32′14.5″N 17°53′35.3″E
- Location: Gniezno
- Country: Poland
- Denomination: Catholic
- Churchmanship: Latin Church

History
- Dedication: Saint George

Architecture
- Architect: Bernard Langweber
- Style: Baroque
- Completed: 12th century

Specifications
- Materials: dimension stone

Administration
- Parish: Parish of the Assumption of Mary in Gniezno

The Church of St. George, also known as the Seminary Church of St. George at the Gniezno Castle, is a collegiate church located in Gniezno. It serves as the seat of the Collegiate Chapter of St. George. The church is also a rectorial church, with the rector being the head of the Gniezno Archdiocesan Major Seminary.

The church is situated on Lech Hill, in close proximity to the Gniezno Cathedral and other collegiate churches. Since 1974, it has been under the care of the Gniezno Archdiocesan Major Seminary.

== Architecture ==
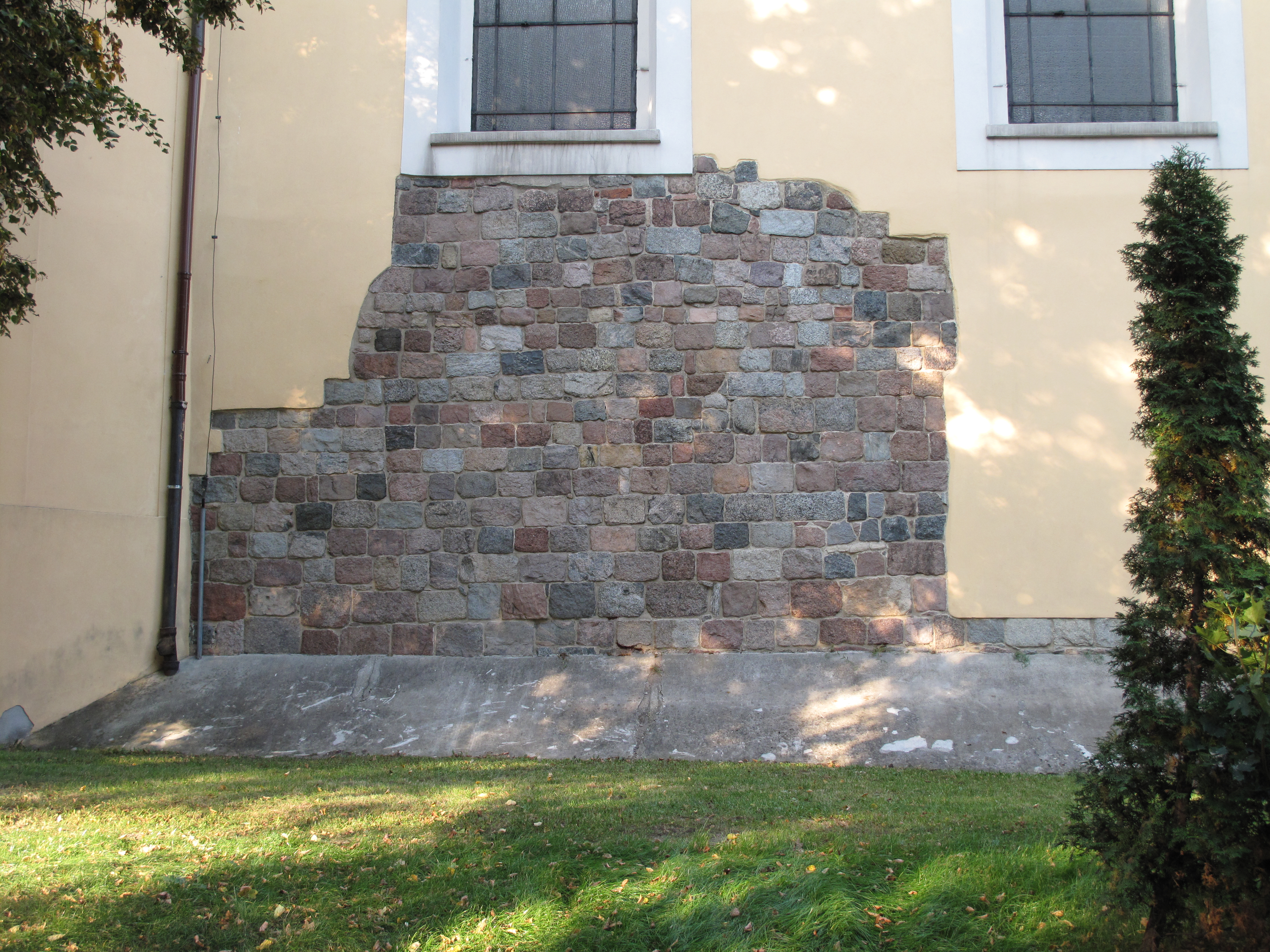
Romanesque wall

The church is built on old foundations, with the lower parts constructed from granite blocks, supplemented with brick in the upper sections. The southern and northern lower sections reveal the stone blocks, while the brick walls are plastered. The church is a single-nave structure with a narrower and lower, small chancel, which is polygonally closed. The chancel is a single-bay, while the nave is three-bayed, covered by a ribbed vault with ribs resting on the strongly projecting pilasters at the corners. The vault features depictions of the Holy Trinity and the Evangelists, while the chancel vault displays images of Saints Peter and Paul. The chancel arch is semi-circular. The choir is vaulted in a ribbed style and supported by three pilastered arches.

The late Baroque western facade, dating from 1782, is rusticated and framed by two corner diagonal, baroque-style buttresses topped with obelisk-like finials. In a semi-circular niche is a statue of St. George sculpted by Marcin Rożek in 1936. The roof is gabled and covered with tiles. The main altar and two side altars at the chancel arch, dating from around 1782, contain contemporary paintings. On the southern wall of the nave, a marble epitaph of the former rector of the theological seminary, Bishop Józef Cybichowski, auxiliary bishop of Gniezno, was placed in 2006 after restoration. On the northern interior wall, the Romanesque stone blocks remain exposed.

Outside, near the entrance to the church, is a plaque commemorating the 25th anniversary of the Greater Poland scouting movement in 1937, which was originally located in the chancel.

== History ==
The church was built on the remains of a stone mound, which was an important pagan cult site until the 10th century. After accepting baptism in 966, Duke Mieszko I chose this symbolic location for his residence, building a palace with a chapel. A fragment of the Romanesque wall exposed on the northern and southern walls dates back to this period. The structure was burned down in 1192 by the troops of Casimir II the Just during his retaliatory campaign against Gniezno. In its place, a new residence with a small church dedicated to St. George was erected, serving as a town church. Since the 13th century, it has functioned as a collegiate church.

In the mid-16th century, it was taken over by the metropolitan chapter, which carried out repairs in 1607. After a fire in 1613, the church was rebuilt between 1615 and 1632. It was almost completely destroyed by another fire in 1760. Archbishop Antoni Ostrowski, lacking funds for reconstruction, ordered the church to be demolished. In 1782, it was thoroughly restored and baroqueized thanks to the efforts of Canon Baltazar Pstrokoński, according to a design by architect Bernard Landwerber from Poznań. The main structure of the church dates back to this period. It underwent extensive renovation in 1936.

On 25 April 1937, the 25th anniversary of the Greater Poland Scouting Region took place on Lech Hill. The celebrations began with a solemn Mass at the Church of St. George, during which a marble plaque commemorating the 25th anniversary of Greater Poland scouting was consecrated. This plaque was embedded in the chancel of the church, where the service took place. On 10 August of the same year, Bishop Antoni Laubitz, on behalf of the Metropolitan Chapter, handed over the church to the Greater Poland scouting movement as a religious center.

On 7 September 1974, Cardinal Stefan Wyszyński transferred the church to the Gniezno Archdiocesan Major Seminary. During this period, notable changes were made, including the wooden flooring of the chancel (now gone) and adjustments to accommodate the post-Vatican II liturgy. With the church designated for educational and pastoral purposes, the care and responsibility for the state of the building were entrusted to the Collegiate Chapter, in accordance with the first paragraph of the decree issued by Cardinal Wyszyński on 30 September 1974. Currently, the rector of the seminary oversees these matters. In the 1990s, the seminary undertook the renovation of the interior: the church floor was completely relaid, including the wooden covering of the chancel floor, the church was repainted, and necessary repairs were made.

== Functioning ==
Currently, the liturgy is celebrated only on Sundays. One Mass is held by the seminary's educators and professors, while the second is led by the Gniezno Academic Pastoral Ministry. Church of St. George is also a place for spiritual meetings of Gniezno's scout troops and various youth prayer groups. Since 2022, the church has also been a venue for the celebration of Tridentine Mass.
