= Gniezno =

City in Greater Poland Voivodeship, Poland

- Royal Capital City of Gniezno; Stołeczne Królewskie Miasto Gniezno
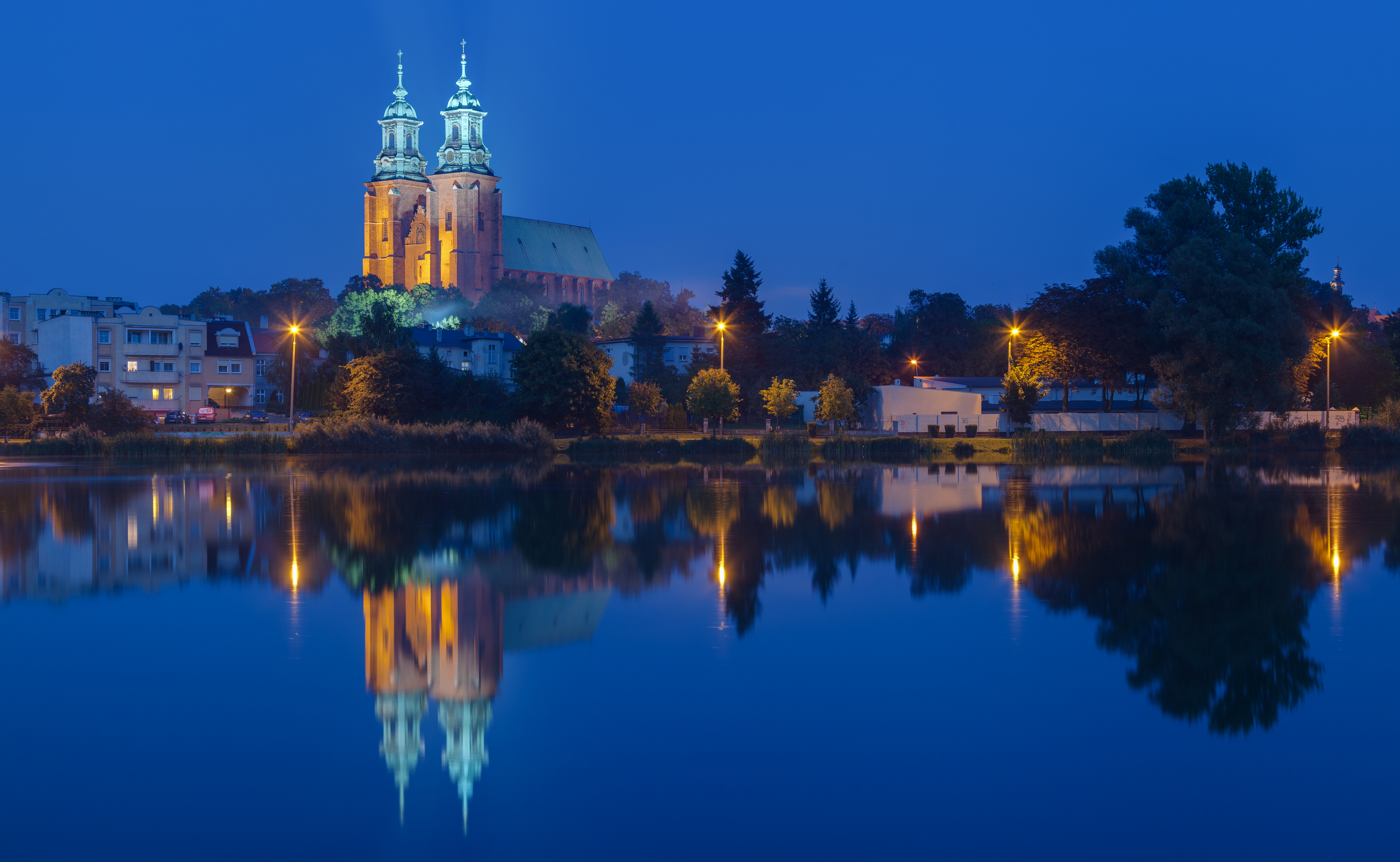
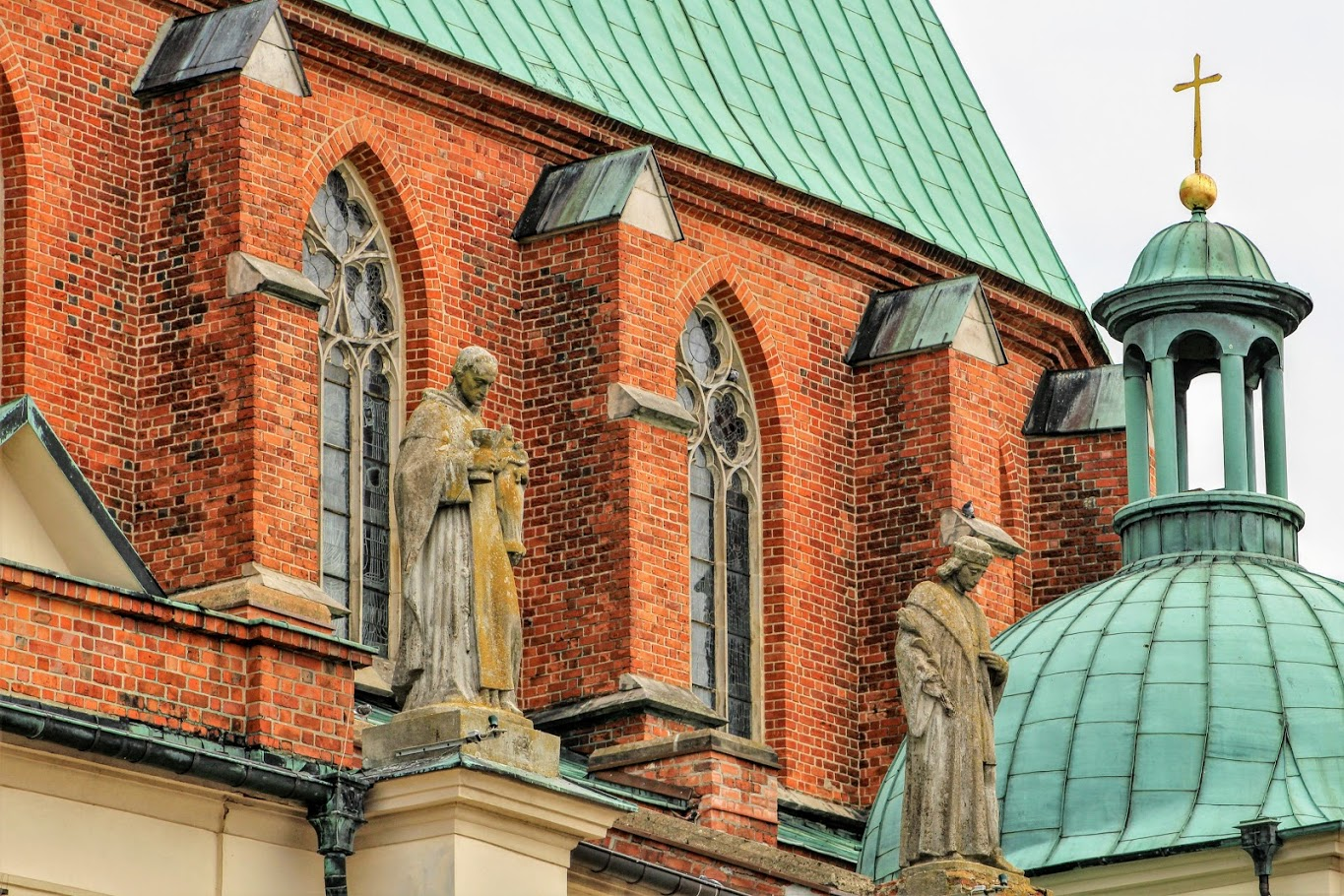
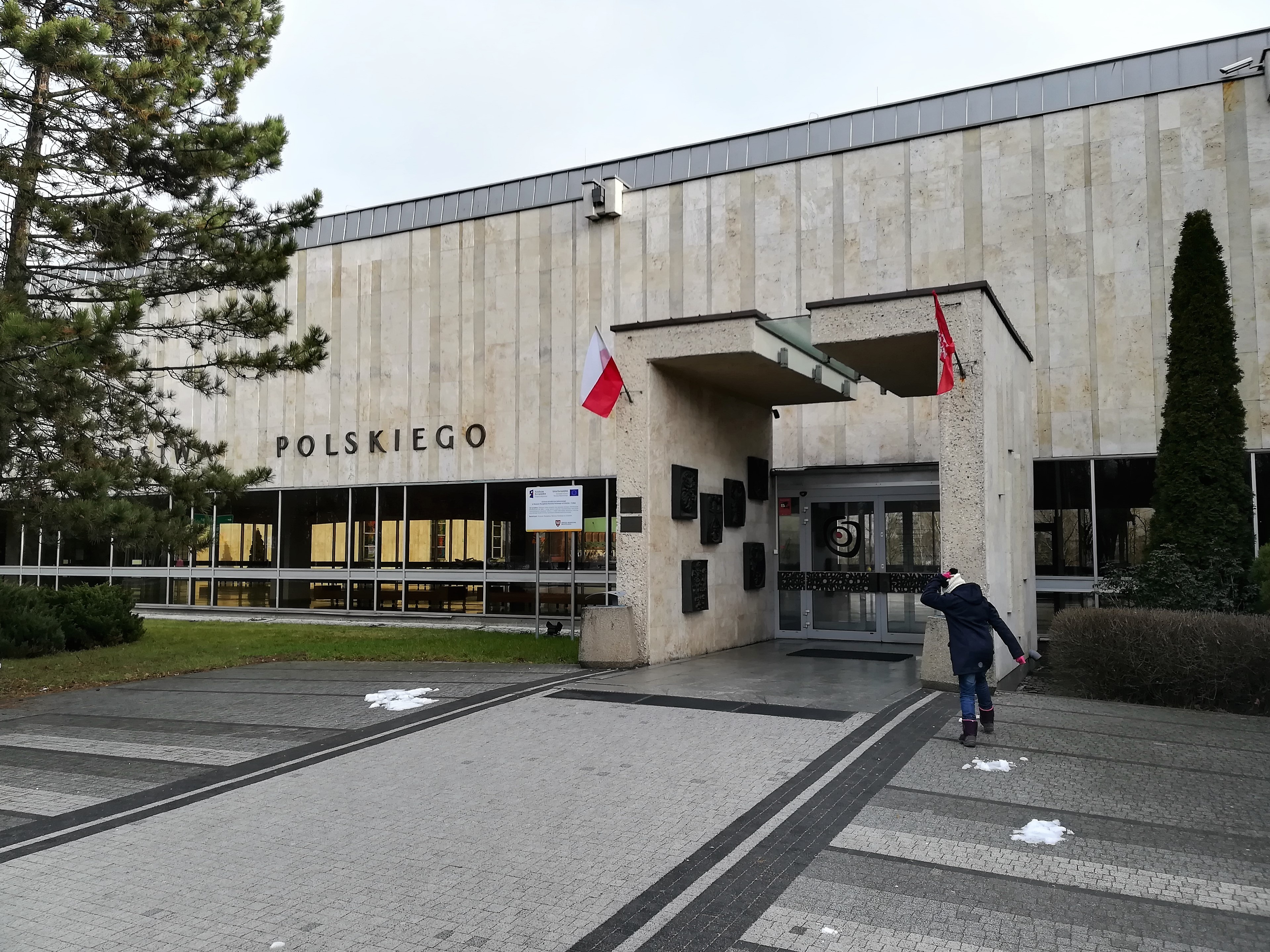
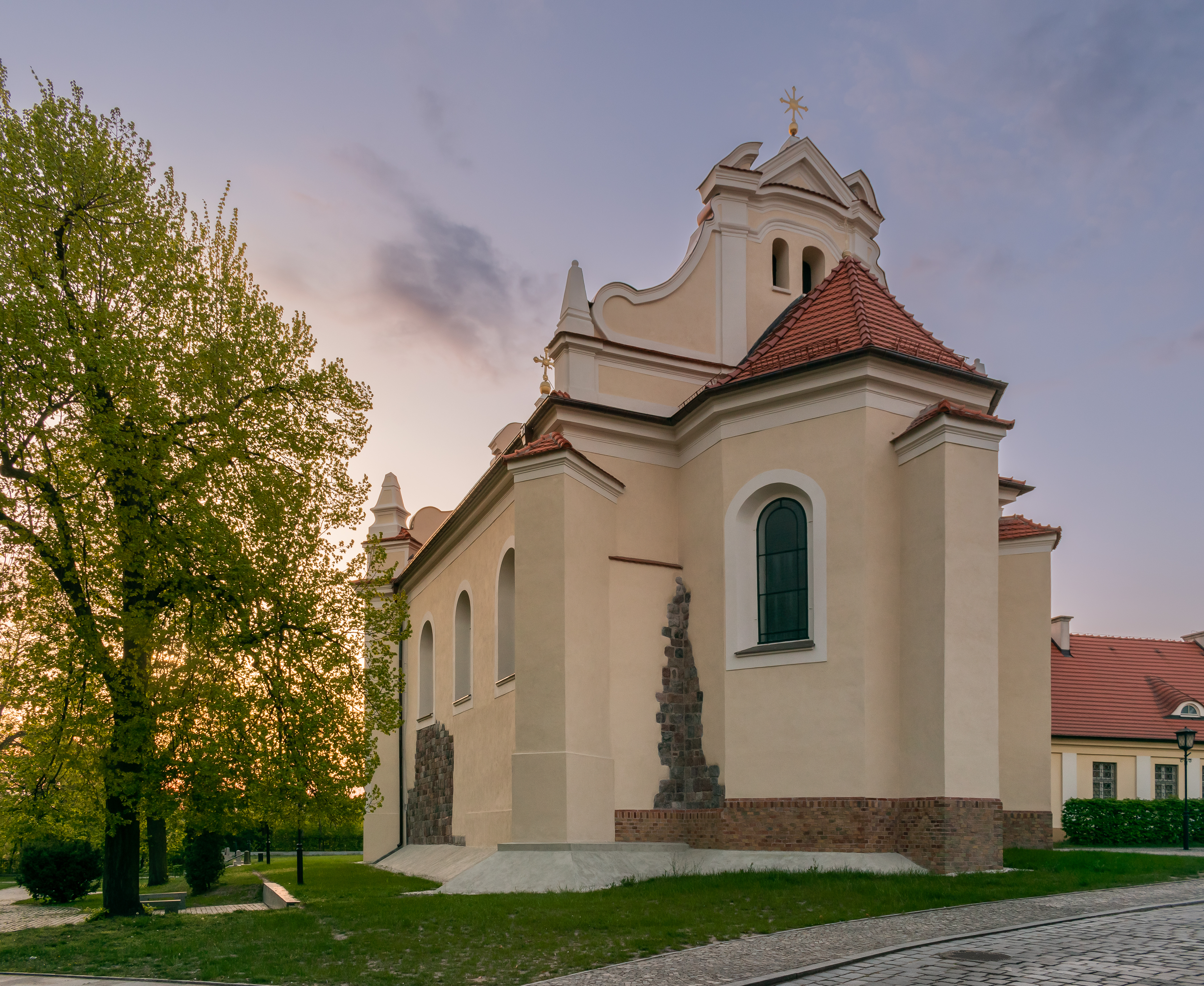
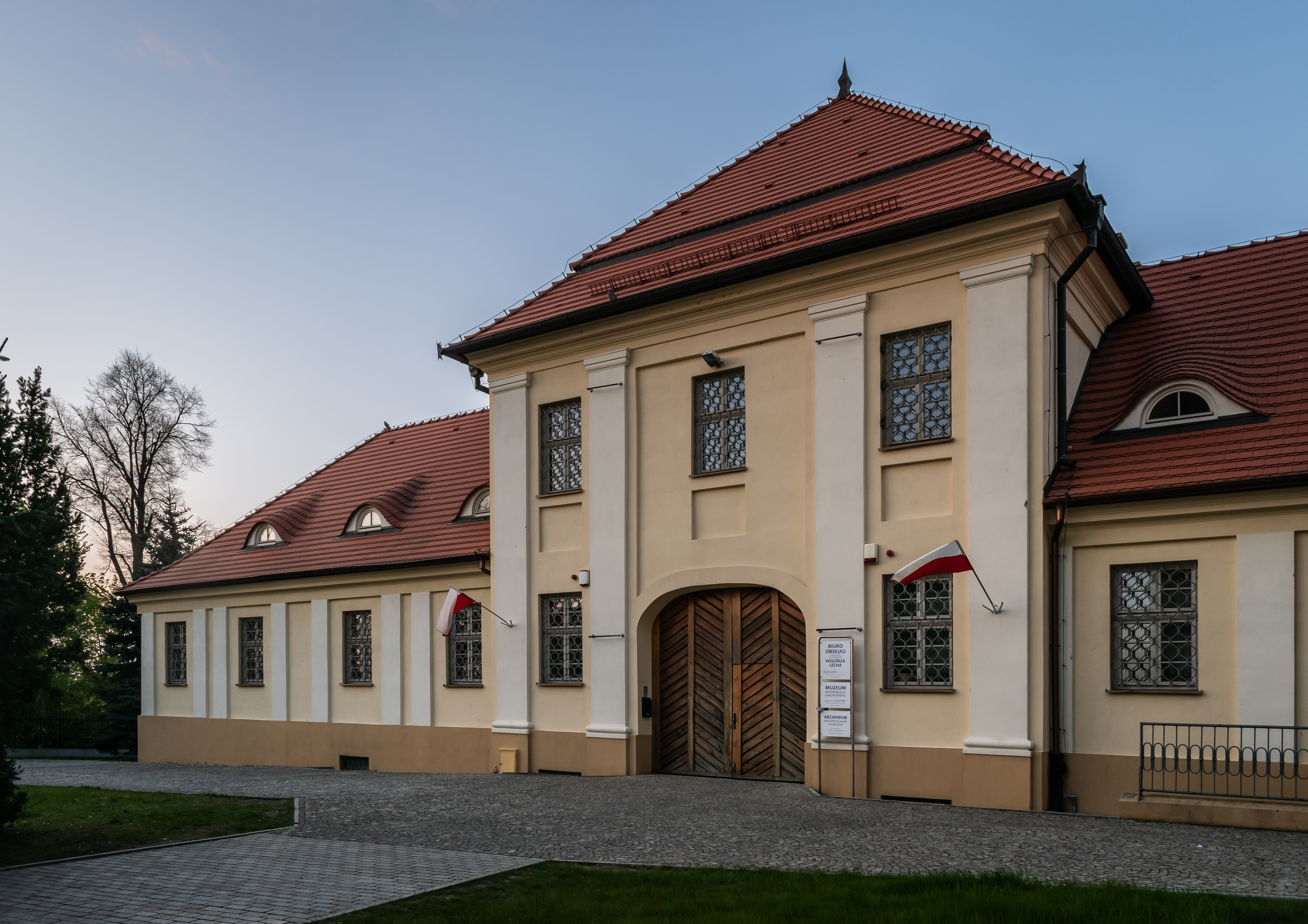
- Gniezno Cathedral Details of the Gniezno Cathedral MPPP Museum Church of St. George Archdiocesan Museum

- Flag Coat of arms Wordmark

- Location within Poland
- Coordinates: 52°32′09″N 17°35′45″E
- Country: Poland
- Voivodeship: Greater Poland
- County: Gniezno
- Gmina: Gniezno (urban gmina)
- Established: 8th-10th century
- City rights: 1239

Government
  - Mayor: Michał Powałowski (PO)

Area
  - Total: 49 km^{2} (19 sq mi)

Population (31 December 2021)
  - Total: 66,769 ▼
  - Density: 1,400/km^{2} (3,500/sq mi)
- Time zone: UTC+1 (CET)
  - Summer (DST): UTC+2 (CEST)
- Postal code: 62–200 to 62–210
- Area code: +48 61
- Car plates: PGN
- Climate: Dfb
- National roads: link = National road 15 (Poland)
- Website: http://www.Gniezno.eu

Gniezno (Note: Polish: Gniezno [ˈɡɲɛznɔ]; Latin: Gnesna) is a city in central-western Poland, about 50 kilometres (31 miles) east of Poznań. Its population in 2021 was 66,769, making it the sixth-largest city in the Greater Poland Voivodeship. The city is the administrative seat of Gniezno County (powiat).

One of the Piast dynasty's chief cities, it was the first historical capital of Poland in the 10th century and early 11th century, and afterwards remained one of the main cities of the historic region of Greater Poland. Gniezno is the seat of the Roman Catholic Archdiocese of Gniezno, the country's oldest archdiocese, founded in 1000, and its archbishop is the primate of Poland, making the city the country's ecclesiastical capital. The Gniezno Cathedral is one of the most historically important churches in Poland, and as such is a designated Historic Monument of Poland. Other sights include the Old Town and the Museum of the Origins of the Polish State.

== Geography ==
Gniezno is one of the historic centers of the Greater Poland region, the cradle of the Polish state. Like Rome, Gniezno was founded on seven hills, including the Lech Hill, which is the location of the Gniezno Cathedral, and the Panieńskie Hill, which is the location of the Rynek (Market Square). Five lakes are located within the city limits: Winiary, Jelonek, Świętokrzyskie, Koszyk, Zacisze.

== History ==
There are archaeological traces of human settlement since the late Paleolithic. Early Slavonic settlements on Lech Hill and Maiden Hill are dated to the 8th century. At the beginning of the 10th century this was the site of several places sacred to the Slavic religion. The ducal stronghold was founded just before 940 on Lech Hill, and surrounded by some fortified suburbs and open settlements.

=== Legend of Lech, Czech and Rus ===
According to the Polish version of a legend, three brothers went hunting together but each of them followed a different prey and eventually they all traveled in different directions. Rus went to the east, Čech headed to the west to settle on the Říp Mountain rising up from the Bohemian hilly countryside, while Lech traveled north. There, while hunting, he followed his arrow and suddenly found himself face-to-face with a fierce, white eagle guarding its nest from intruders. Seeing the eagle against the red of the setting sun, Lech took this as a good omen and decided to settle there. He named his settlement Gniezno (from Polish gniazdo – 'nest') in commemoration and adopted the White Eagle as his coat-of-arms. The white eagle remains a symbol of Poland to this day, and the colors of the eagle and the setting sun are depicted in Poland's coat of arms, as well as its flag, with a white stripe on top for the eagle, and a red stripe on the bottom for the sunset. According to Wielkopolska Chronicle (13th century), Slavs are descendants of Pan, a Pannonian prince. He had three sons – Lech (the youngest), Rus, and Čech (the oldest), who decided to settle west, north, and east.

=== Cradle of the Polish state ===
Around 940 Gniezno, being an important pagan cult center, became one of the main fortresses of the early Piast rulers, along with aforementioned fortresses at Giecz, Kruszwica, Poznań, Kalisz, Łęczyca, Ostrów Lednicki, Płock, Włocławek, and others. Archaeological excavations on Lech Hill in 2010 discovered an 11th-century tomb by the foundations of St. George's church, near the remains of a pagan burial mound discovered earlier on the hill. Discoveries indicate that Lech Hill could have been the burial place of rulers even before the baptism of Mieszko I of Poland. After the adoption of Christianity by Mieszko I, his son Bolesław I the Brave deposited the remains of Saint Adalbert in a church, newly built on the Hill, to underline Gniezno's importance as the religious centre and capital of his kingdom.

=== Congress of Gniezno ===
It is here that the Congress of Gniezno took place in the year 1000, during which Bolesław I the Brave, Duke of Poland, received Holy Roman Emperor Otto III. The emperor and the Polish duke celebrated the foundation of the Polish ecclesiastical province (archbishopric) in Gniezno, along with newly established bishoprics in Kołobrzeg for Pomerania; Wrocław for Silesia; Kraków for Lesser Poland in addition to the bishopric in Poznań for western Greater Poland, which was established in 968.

=== Royal coronation site ===
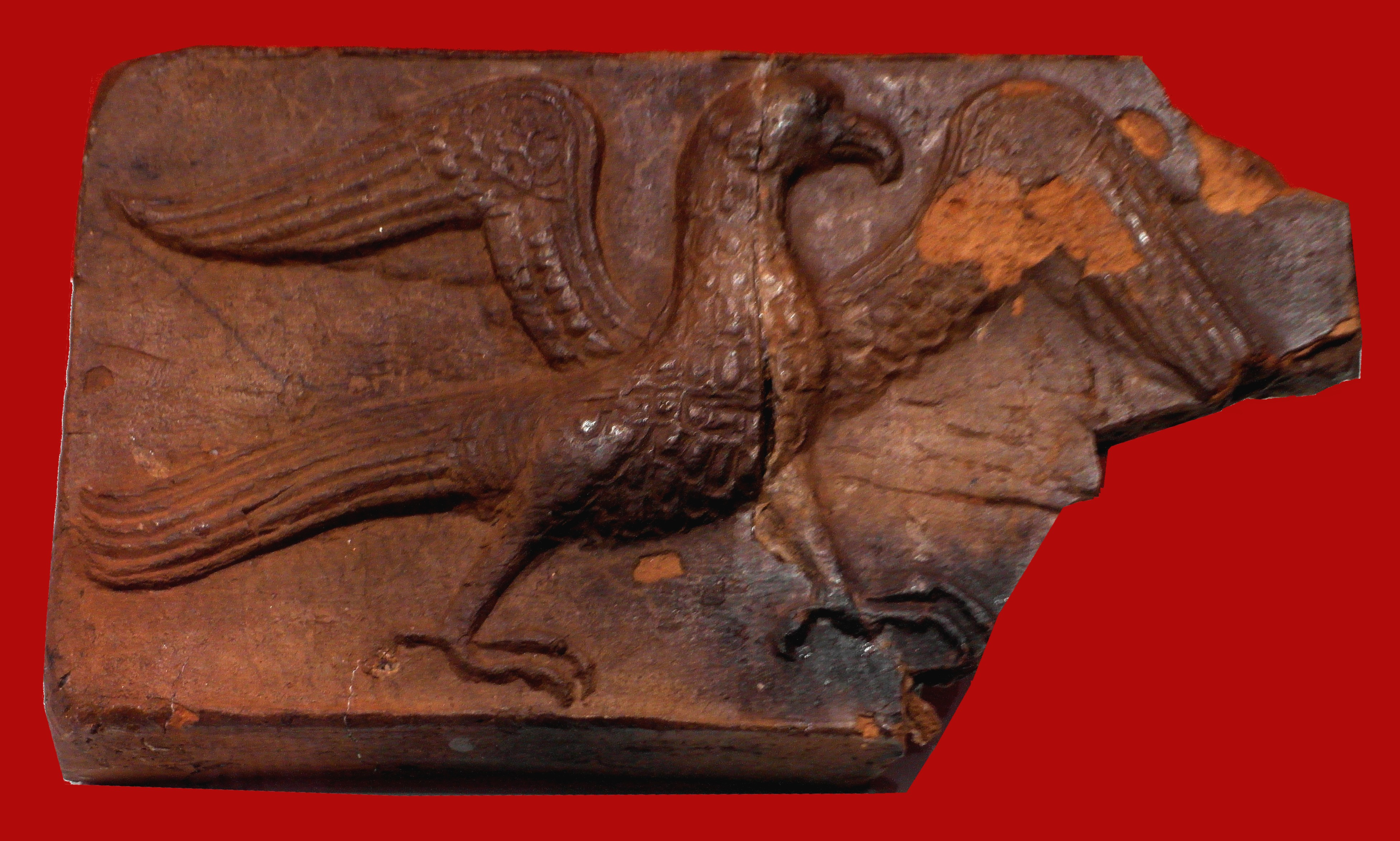
12th-century ceramic tiel from Gniezno depicting an eagle

The 10th-century Gniezno Cathedral witnessed the royal coronations of Bolesław I in 1024 and his son Mieszko II Lambert in 1025. The cities of Gniezno and nearby Poznań were captured, plundered and destroyed in 1038 by the Bohemian duke Bretislav I, which pushed the next Polish rulers to move the Polish capital to Kraków. The archepiscopal cathedral was reconstructed by the next ruler, Bolesław II the Generous, who was crowned king here in 1076.

In the next centuries Gniezno evolved as a regional seat of the eastern part of Greater Poland, and in 1238 municipal autonomy was granted by the duke Władysław Odonic. Gniezno was again the coronation site in 1295 and 1300.

=== Regional site of Greater Poland ===
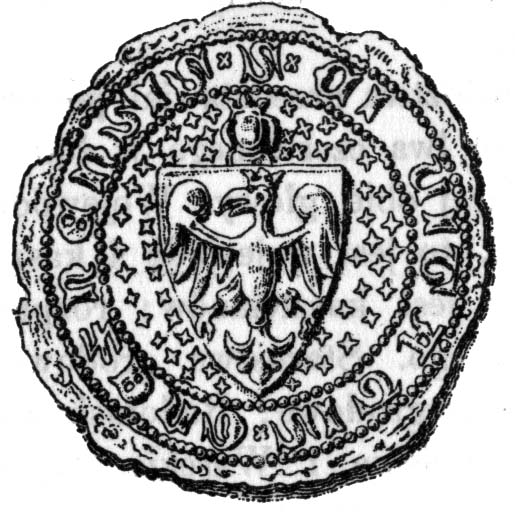
Medieval seal of Gniezno

After an administrative reform Gniezno, as a royal city, became a county seat within the Kalisz Voivodeship (since the early 14th century till 1768). It was destroyed again by the Teutonic Knights' invasion in 1331. The city was soon rebuilt during the reign of King Casimir III the Great, while during the reign of King Władysław II Jagiełło, in 1419, the status of "the capital of Christianity in Poland" was confirmed after the archbishops of Gniezno were given the title of Primate of Poland. Trade flourished in Gniezno, four large annual fairs took place, in which merchants from various Polish cities and European countries took part. Crafts also developed, and Gniezno remained one of the major cities of Poland until the mid-17th century, even despite fires of 1515 and 1613.

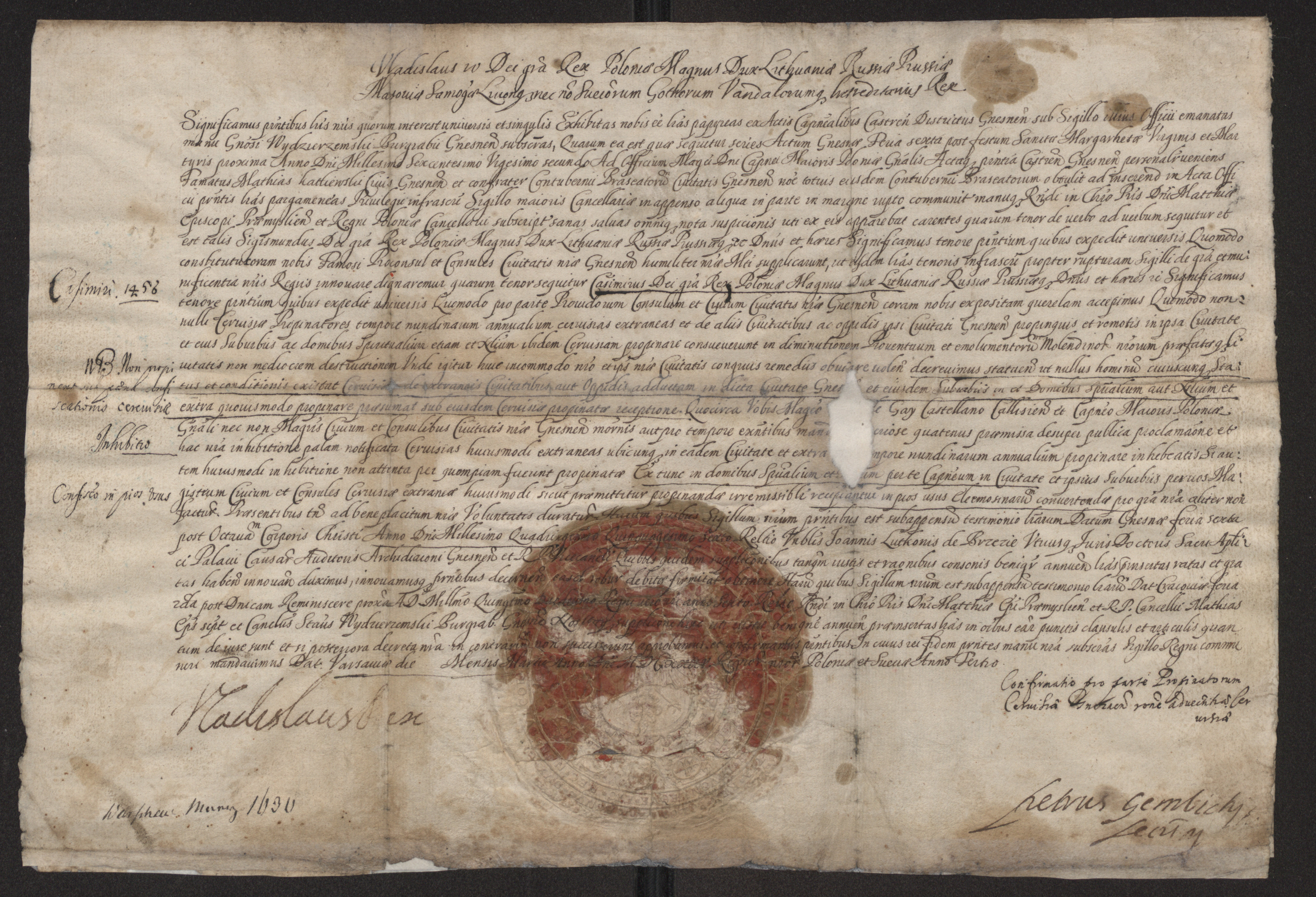
King Władysław IV Vasa confirms the old privileges of Gniezno, 1635

It was devastated during the Swedish invasion wars of the 17th–18th centuries and by a plague in 1708–1710. All this caused depopulation and economic decline, but the city was soon revived during the 18th century to become the capital of the Gniezno Voivodeship within the larger Greater Poland Province in 1768. Gniezno remained one of the main cultural centres of the Polish Kingdom. The 11th Polish Infantry Regiment and 1st Polish National Cavalry Brigade were stationed there in 1790 and 1792, respectively.

=== Late modern period ===
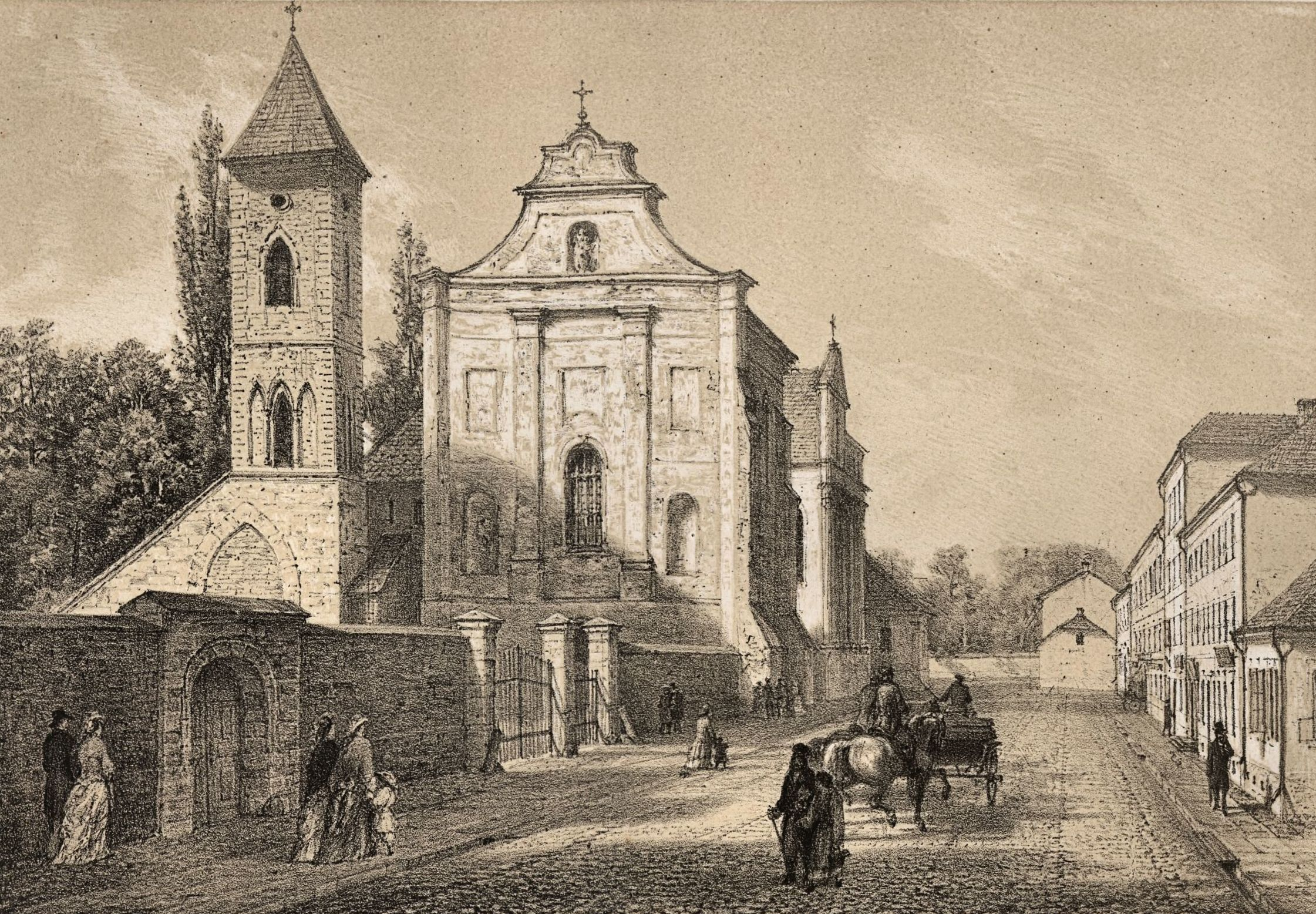
19th-century painting of Gniezno

Gniezno was annexed by the Kingdom of Prussia in the 1793 Second Partition of Poland and renamed Gnesen, becoming part of the province of South Prussia. During the Kościuszko Uprising, the Polish army under General Jan Henryk Dąbrowski liberated the town on 22 August 1794 and defeated a Prussian Army north of Gnesen near Labischin (Łabiszyn) on 29 September 1794. But because of Kościuszko's defeat at the Battle of Maciejowice he gave up his plan to winter in Bromberg (Bydgoszcz) and moved through Thorn (Toruń) and retreated to central Poland. Thus, the Prussians retook it on 7 December 1794. During the Napoleonic Wars there was an uprising against Prussian rule. The French appeared in Gnesen in November 1806, and following General Jan Henryk Dabrowski's order issued to all towns and cities and country property owners to provide recruits for the organizing Polish forces, Gnesen initially provided 60 recruits who participated in the battles of 1806–07. The 9th Polish Infantry Regiment was formed in Gniezno in 1806. Consequently, the town, once again as Gniezno, was included within the Duchy of Warsaw, but upon the defeat of Napoleon in Russia in 1812 it was occupied by the Russian army and was returned to Prussia in the 1815 Congress of Vienna. Gnesen was subsequently governed within Kreis Gnesen of the Grand Duchy of Posen and the later Province of Posen. It was an important centre of Polish resistance against Germanisation policies, various Polish organizations and publishing houses were located there. In 1857, Jews accounted for 27 percent of the population, which number decreased by emigration to more developed towns of Germany to 14.5 percent in 1871.

In 1903, amid school strikes elsewhere in Prussian Poland, Prussian authorities arrested 50 Polish children and teachers in Gnesen on charges of high treason. They were accused of studying Polish culture and of "conspiring against the well-being of the Prussian State".

Following the Greater Poland Uprising (1918–1919) and the Treaty of Versailles the town became part of the Second Polish Republic and reverted to its original name of Gniezno. 31 Polish insurgents from the city died in the Greater Poland Uprising. Its citizen-soldiers joined the Polish army fighting the Bolsheviks during the Polish–Soviet War. The first Polish folk high school was established in the present-day district of Dalki in 1921.

=== World War II ===
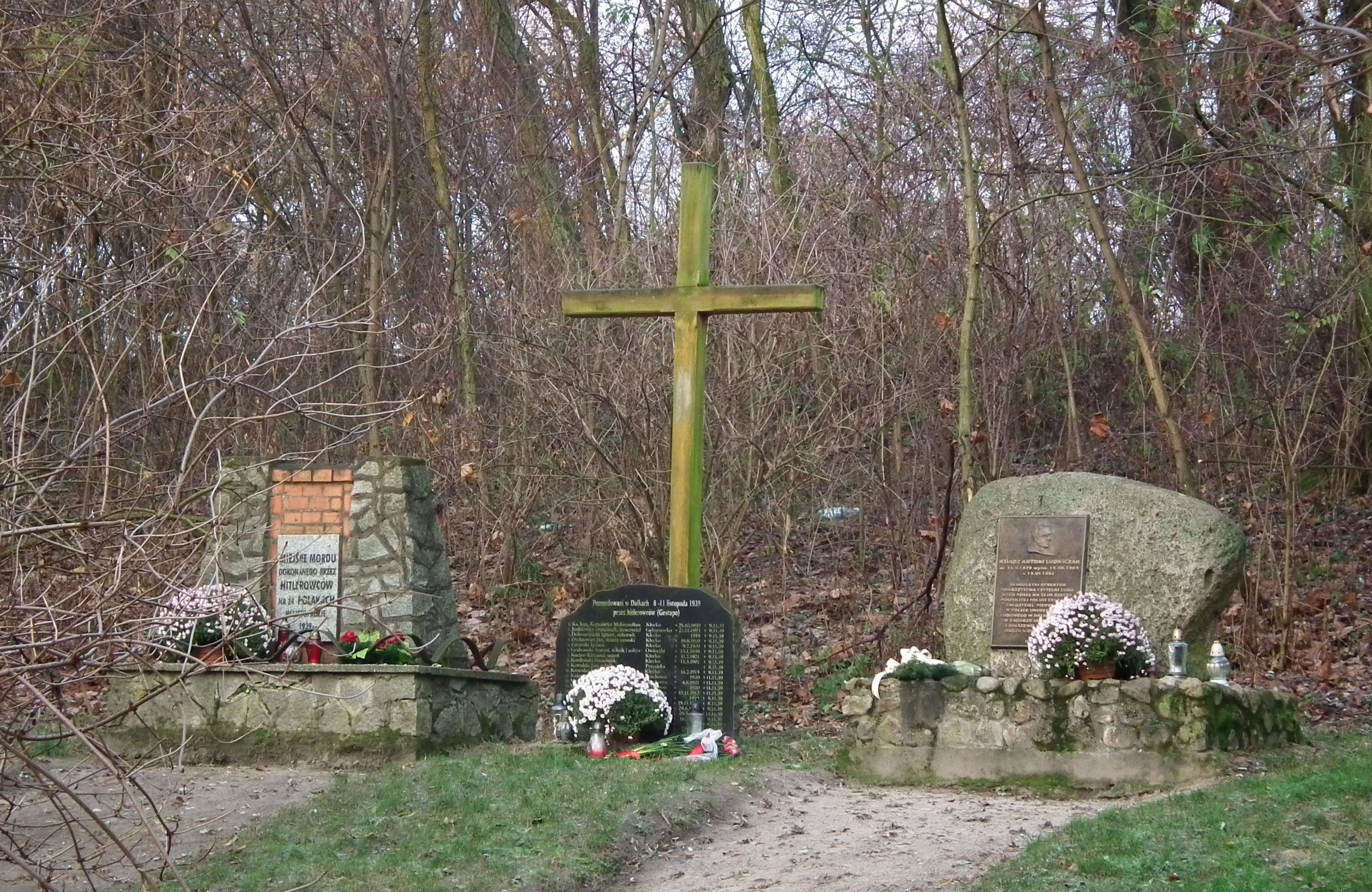
Memorial at the site of a German execution of 24 Poles in November 1939 in the Dalki district

During the invasion of Poland, which started World War II, Gniezno was captured by Germans troops on 11 September 1939. On 26 October 1939 it was annexed into Nazi Germany as part of Reichsgau Wartheland. During the German occupation, local Poles were subjected to arrests, expulsions and mass executions. The Germans murdered several hundred inhabitants, and more than 10,000 inhabitants of the city and county were expelled to the General Government in the more-eastern part of German-occupied Poland or imprisoned in Nazi concentration camps. A transit camp for Poles expelled from the region and a forced labour subcamp of the Stalag XXI-D prisoner-of-war camp were operated in the city. Kidnapped Polish 12-year-old children were enslaved as forced labour in the city's vicinity. In late 1940 at the Dziekanka (Tiegenhof in German) psychiatric institute near Gniezno, 1172 patients were evacuated and then killed. Again in late 1940 hundreds of patients were gassed in gas van by the Lange Commando, a sub-unit of Einsatzkommando 2. Despite this, Gniezno remained a center of Polish resistance, including the Tajna Organizacja Narodowa (Secret National Organization), which was founded in the city itself. Its commander Maksymilian Sikorski was eventually imprisoned in concentration camps.

After the city was seized by the Red Army on January 21, 1945, the Soviets fought the Polish underground and deported its members deep into the Soviet Union. The city itself was not seriously damaged during the war, however, in 1940, the Germans demolished the monument of King Bolesław I the Brave, which was rebuilt after the war. The city was subsequently restored to Poland, although with a Soviet-installed communist regime, which stayed in power until the Fall of Communism in the 1980s.

=== Post-war period ===
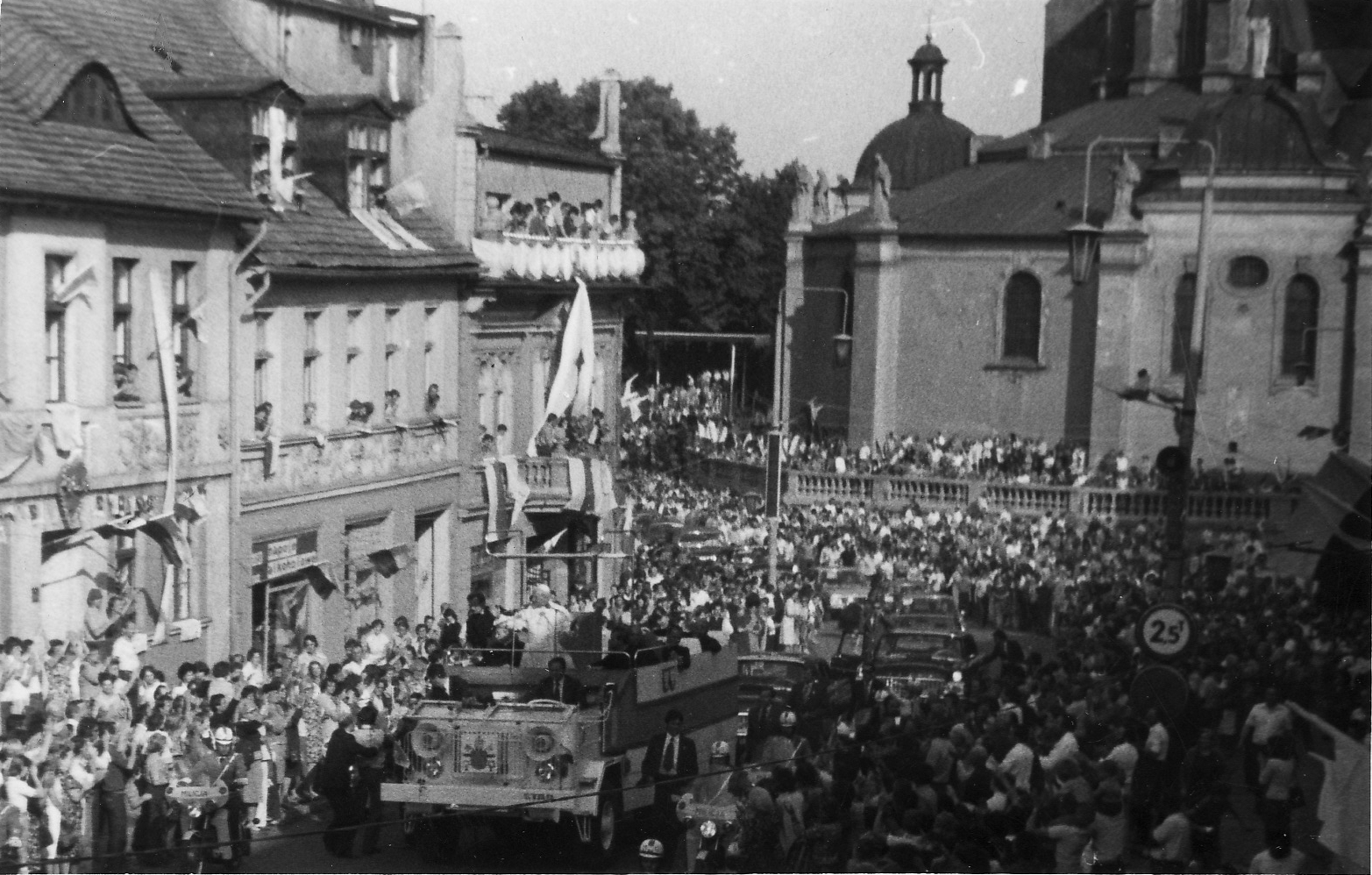
Gniezno during the visit of Pope John Paul II in 1979

In August 1980, employees of local factories joined the nationwide anti-communist strikes, which led to the foundation of the Solidarity organization, which played a central role in the end of communist rule in Poland. In 1979 and 1997, Pope John Paul II visited Gniezno. During the second visit, celebrations took place on the millennial anniversary of the death of St. Adalbert with the participation of presidents of seven Central European countries and 280,000 pilgrims from Poland and the world. In 2000, the millennial anniversary of the Congress of Gniezno was celebrated and on this occasion the Sejm was held in Gniezno, the only one held outside of Warsaw in recent decades.

== Archbishops of Gniezno ==
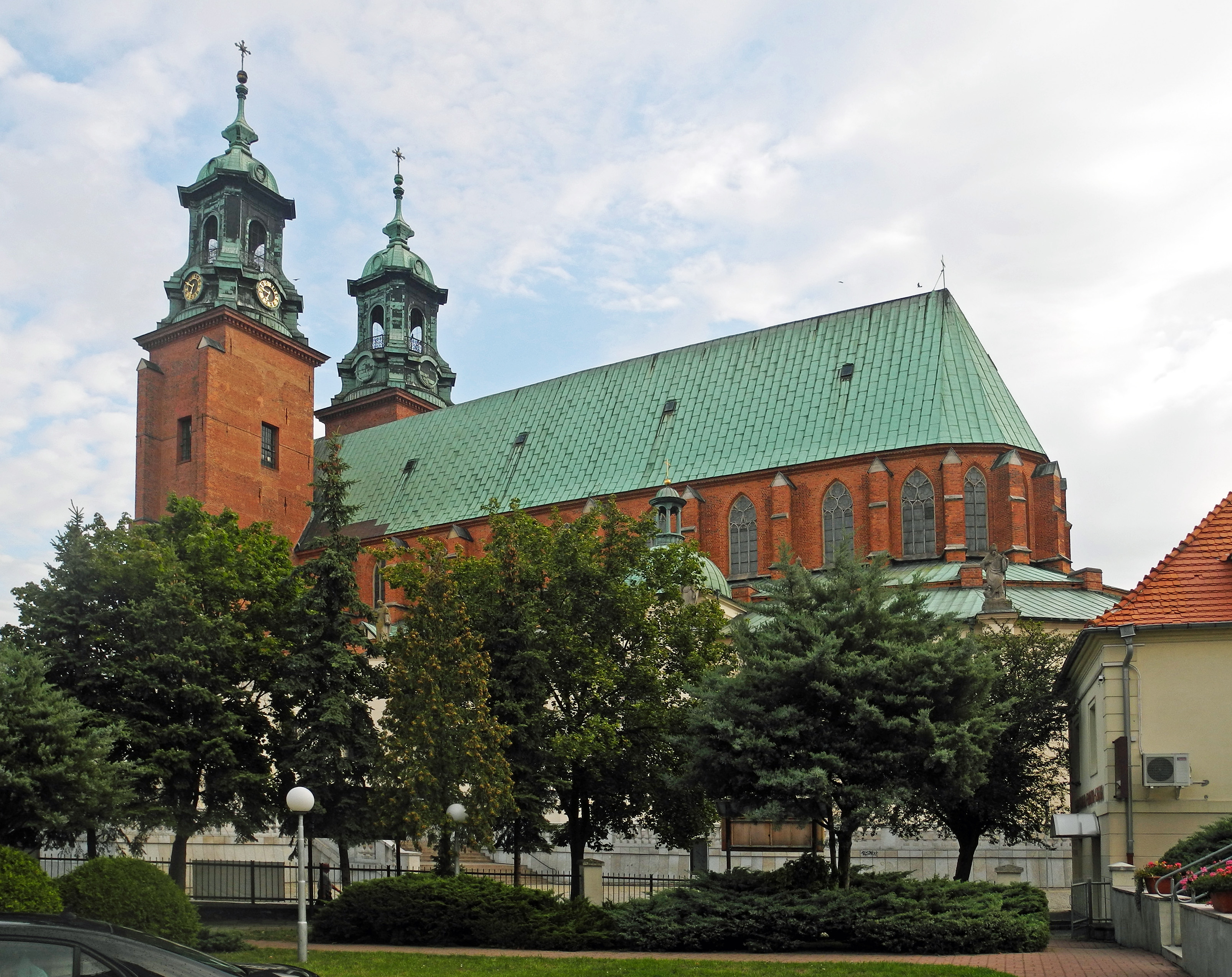
View of Cathedral Basilica of the Assumption of the Blessed Virgin Mary and St. Adalbert. On the right side - church under the invocation of St. John the Baptist

Gniezno's Roman Catholic archbishop is traditionally the Primate of Poland (Prymas Polski). After the partitions of Poland the see was often combined with others, first with Poznań and then with Warsaw. In 1992 Pope John Paul II reorganized the Polish hierarchy and the city once again had a separate bishop. Cardinal Józef Glemp, who had been archbishop of Gniezno and Warsaw and retained Warsaw, was designated to remain Primate until his retirement, but afterward the Archbishop of Gniezno, at present Wojciech Polak, would again be Primate of Poland.

== Royal coronations in Gniezno cathedral ==
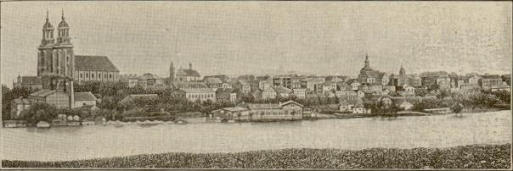
Panorama of Gniezno. 19th century

- 25 December 1024 – Bolesław I the Brave
- 25 December 1025 – Mieszko II Lambert and his wife Richeza of Lotharingia
- 25 December 1076 – Bolesław the Generous and his wife Wyszesława of Kiev
- 26 June 1295 – Przemysł II and his wife Margaret of Brandenburg
- August 1300 – Wenceslaus II of Bohemia

== Demographics ==
Historical population
Year	Pop.	±%
1912	25,339	—
1980	62,400	+146.3%
1990	70,400	+12.8%
1995	71,000	+0.9%
2021	66,769	−6.0%

== Sights ==
The landmarks of Gniezno include:

- Gothic Gniezno Cathedral, one of the historically most important Polish churches, designated a Historic Monument of Poland; the seat of the Roman Catholic Archdiocese of Gniezno, which is the oldest archdiocese of Poland, founded in 1000. It contains the Gniezno Doors, one of the most important works of Romanesque art in Poland, as well as the coffin of Saint Adalbert of Prague
- Gniezno Old Town, filled with historic townhouses, buildings and churches:
  - Gothic-Baroque Holy Trinity church
  - Gothic-Baroque Franciscan church and monastery
  - Saint John the Baptist church
  - Gothic Saint Lawrence church
  - Baroque Saint George church
  - Gothic Saint Michael Archangel church
  - Gothic Revival Church of Blessed Michał Kozal
- Museum of the Origins of the Polish State (Muzeum Początków Państwa Polskiego)
- Museum of Archdiocese of Gniezno (Muzeum Archidiecezjalne w Gnieźnie)
- Monument of King Bolesław I the Brave
- Gniezno locomotive depot
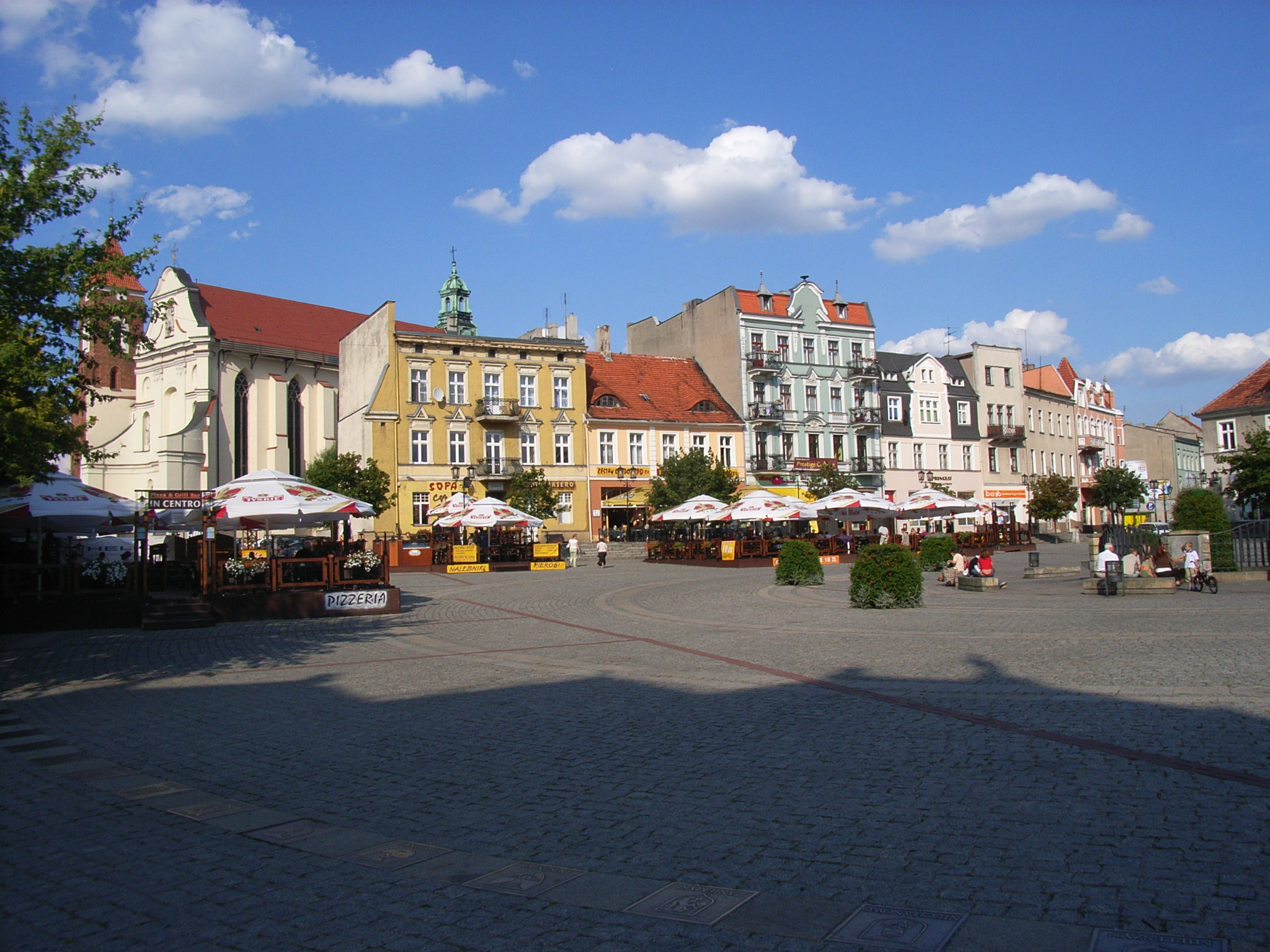
Market Square (Rynek)

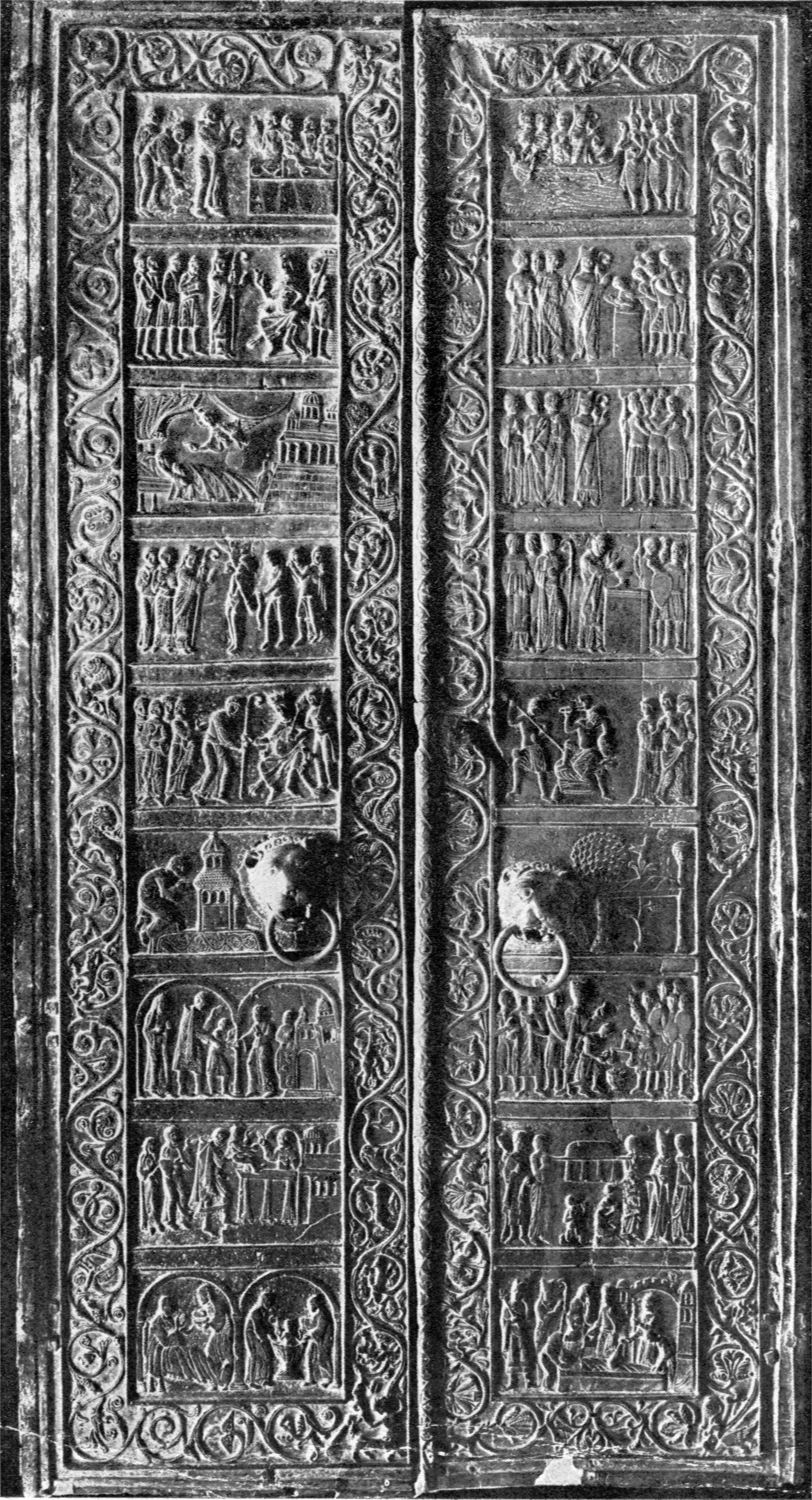
Gniezno Doors in the Cathedral

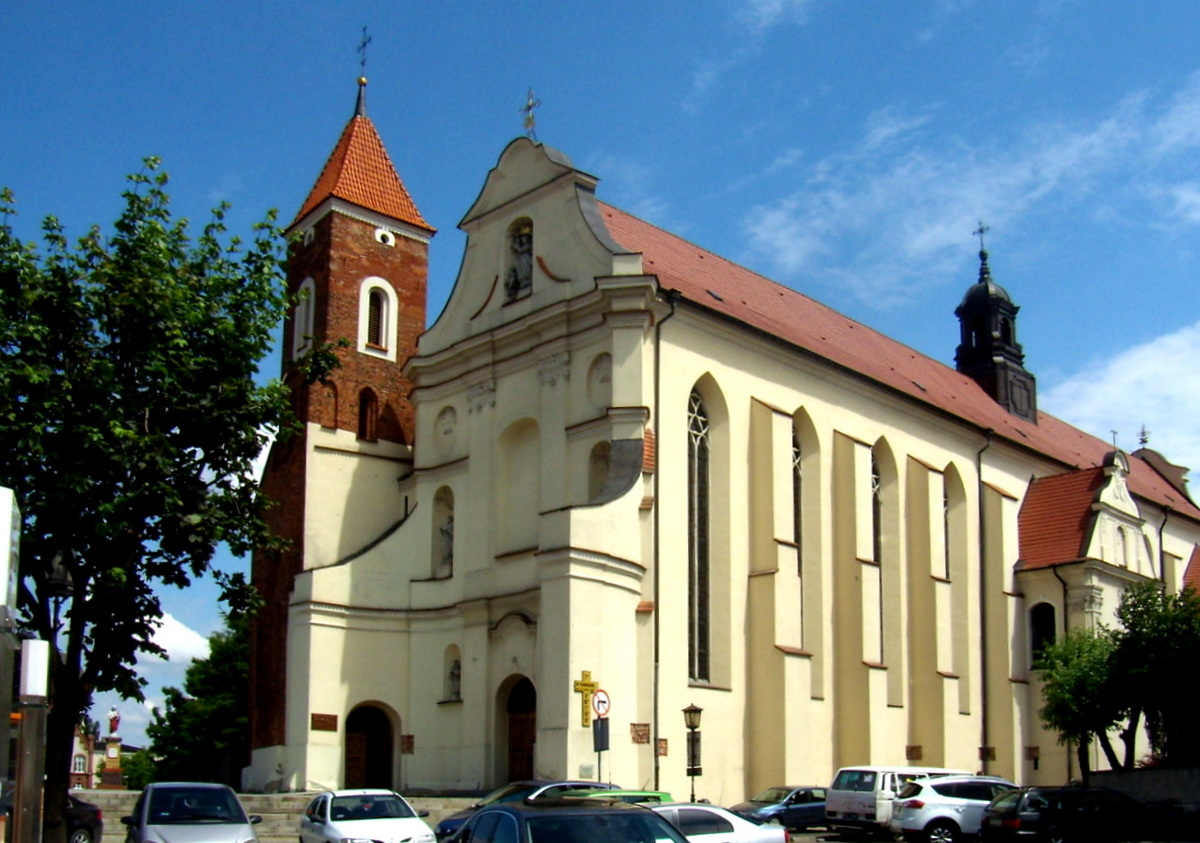
Franciscan Church

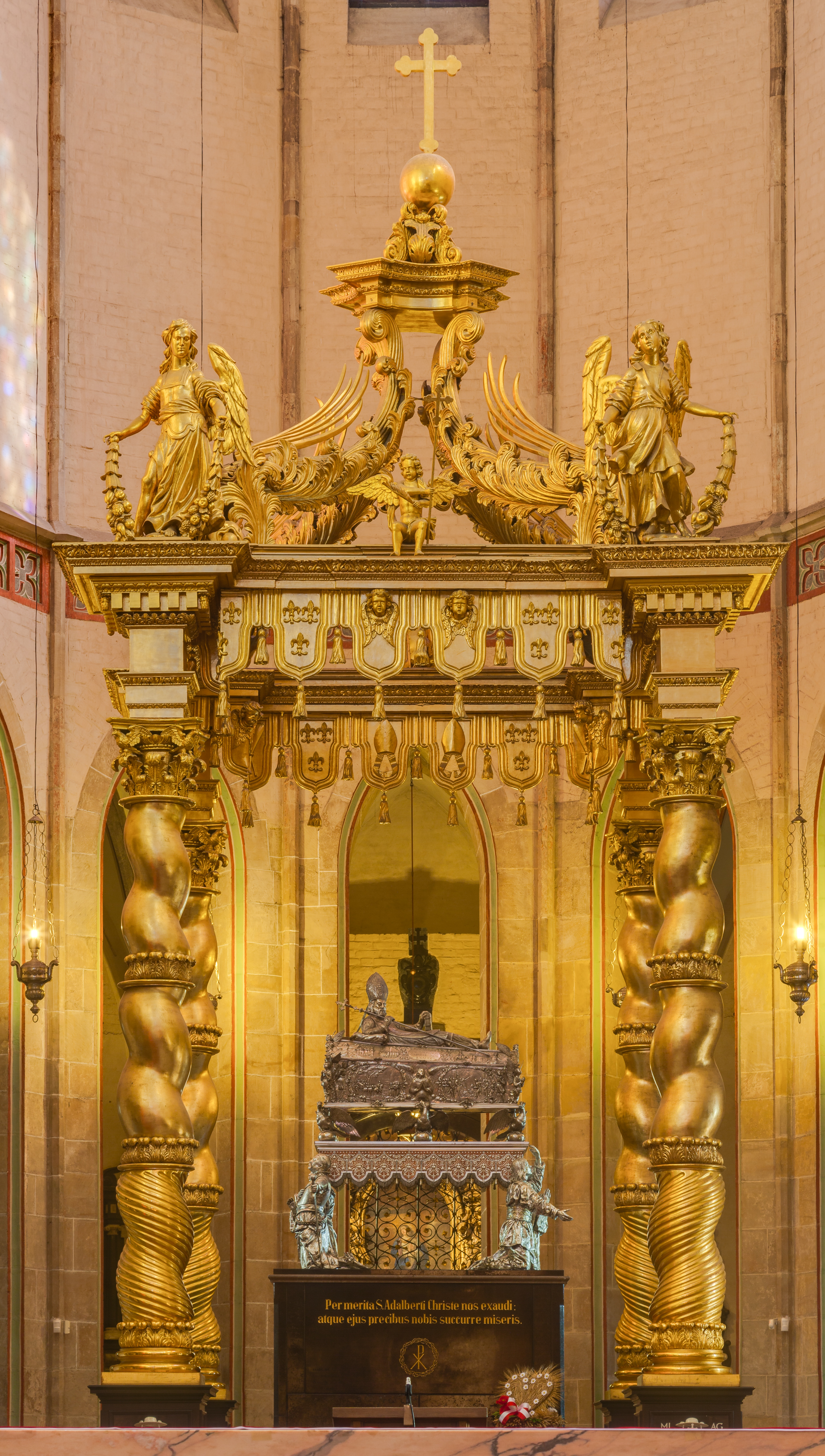
Coffin of Adalbert of Prague in the Cathedral

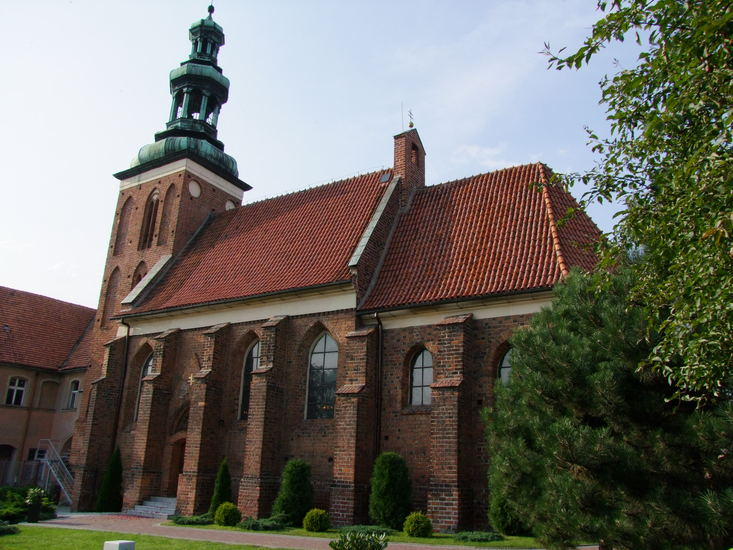
Gothic Saint John the Baptist church

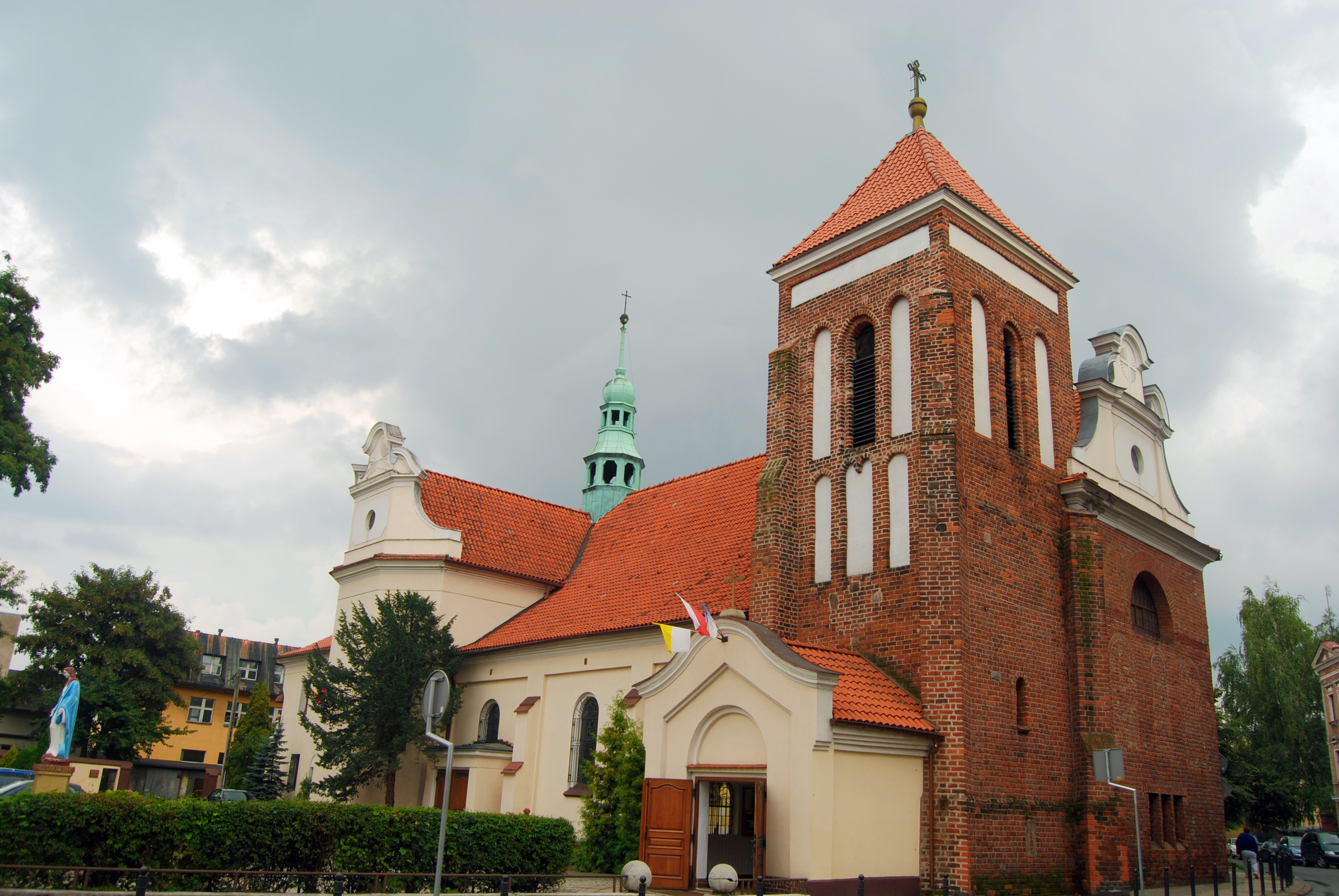
Saint Lawrence church

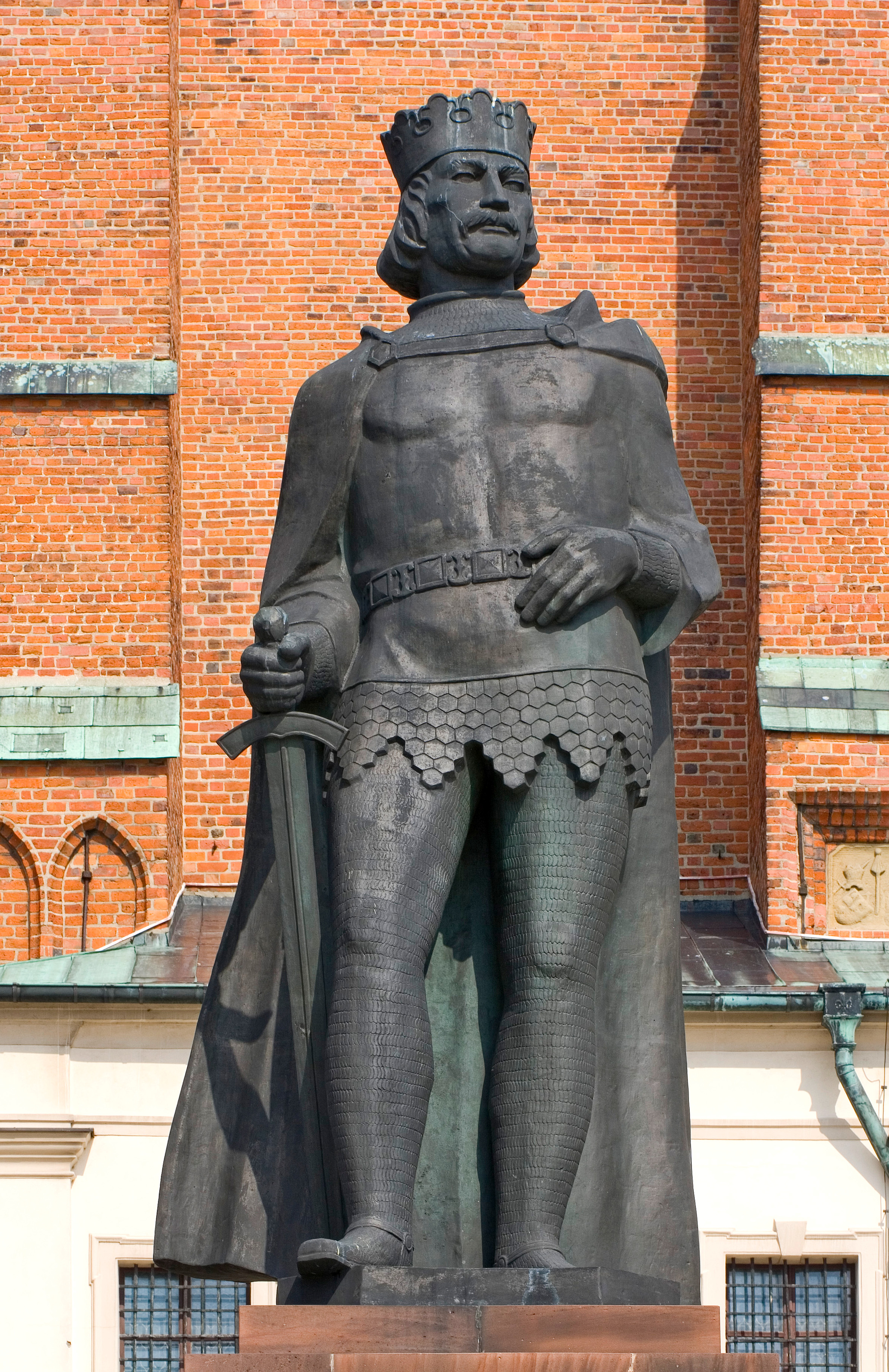
Statue of King Bolesław I the Brave

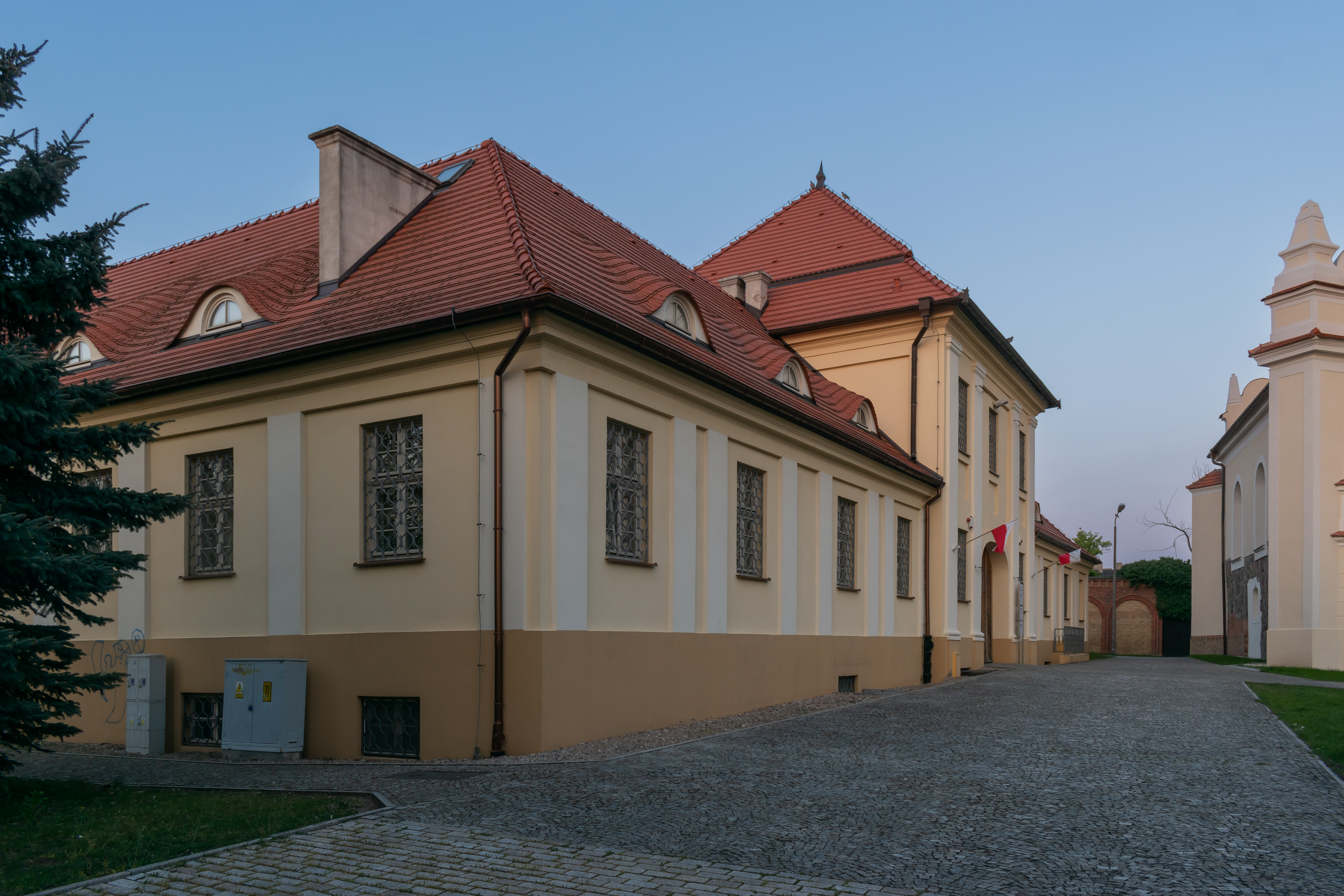
Museum of Archdiocese in Gniezno

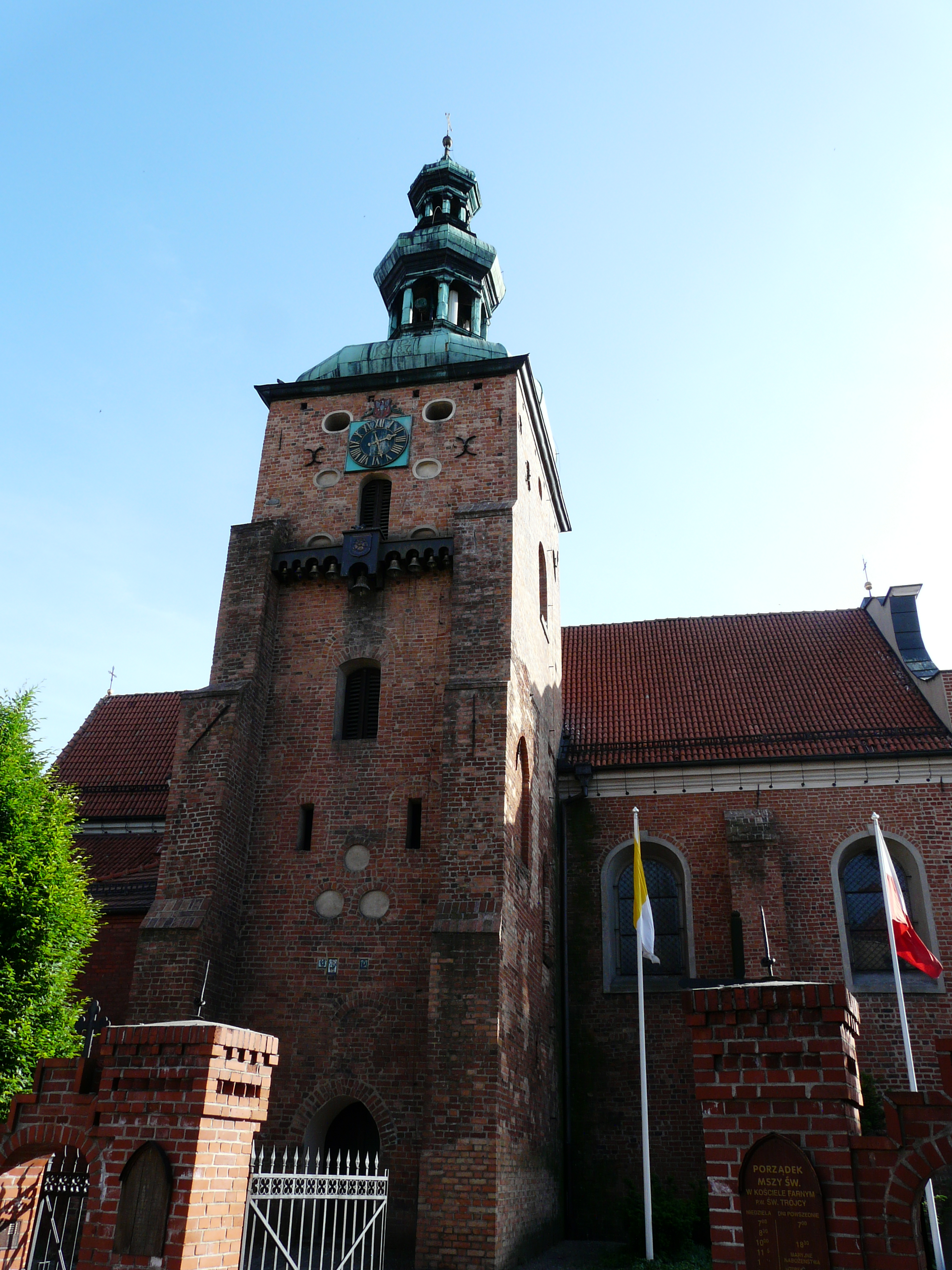
Holy Trinity church

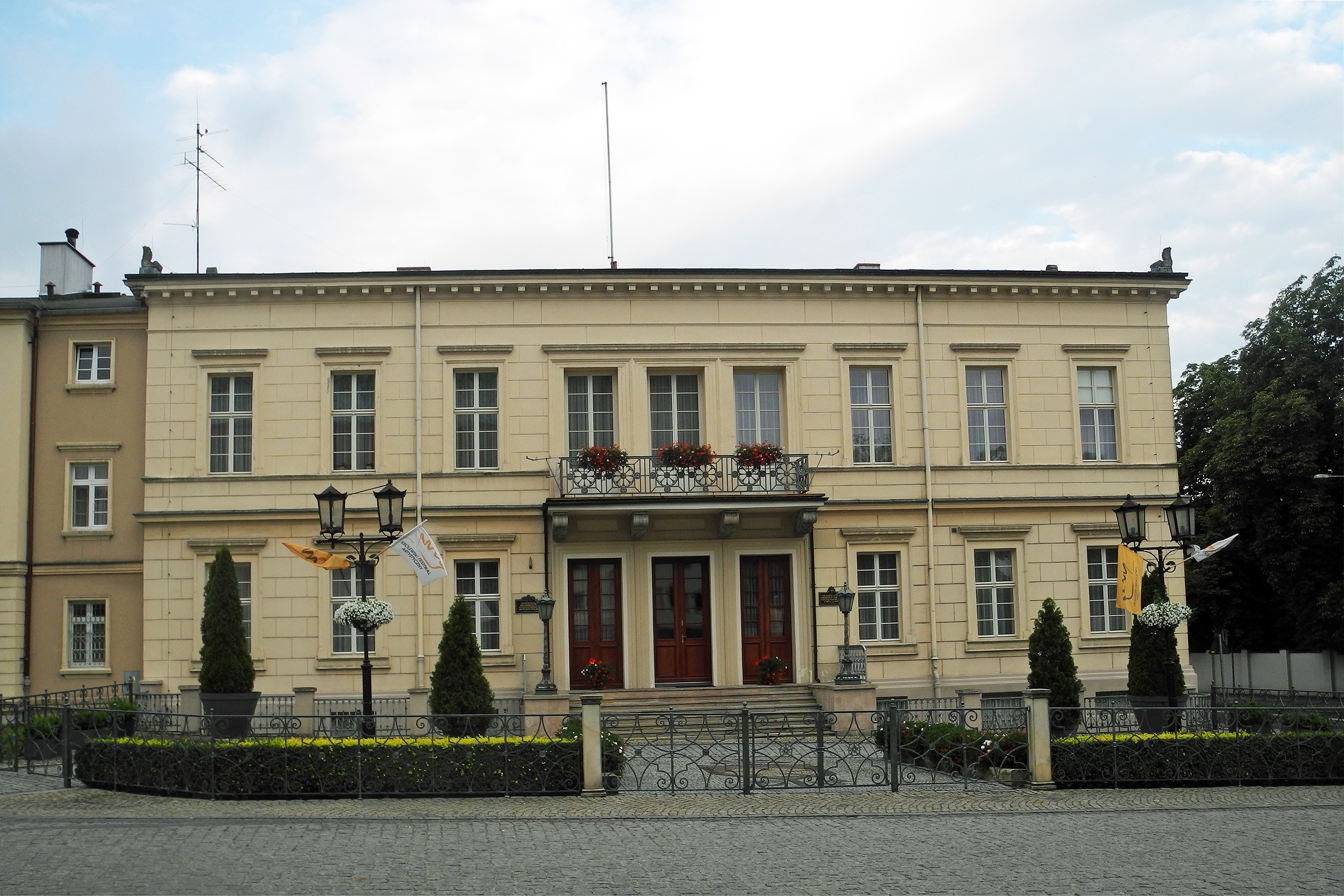
Episcopal palace of Primates of Poland

== Education ==
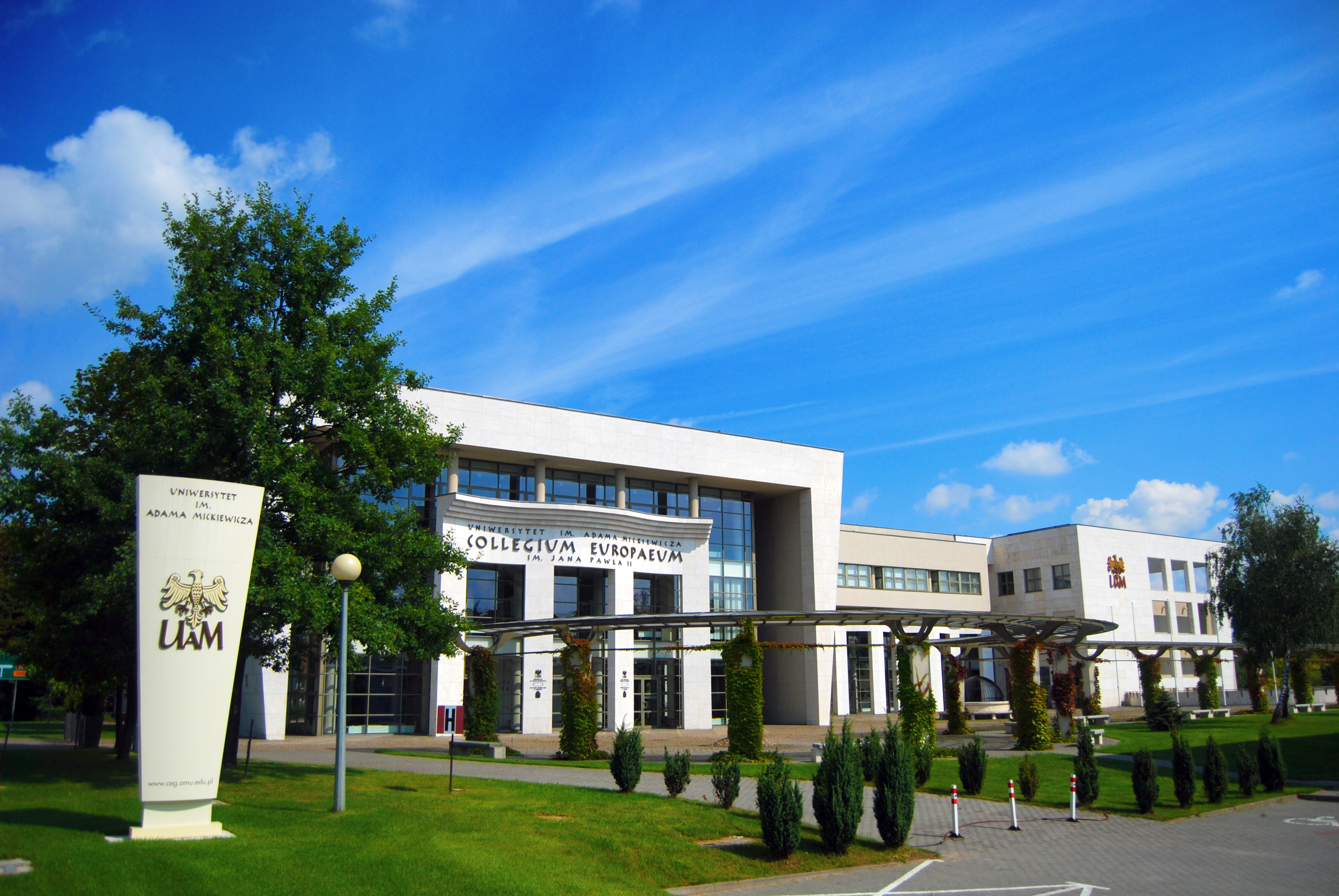
Collegium Europaeum Gnesnense

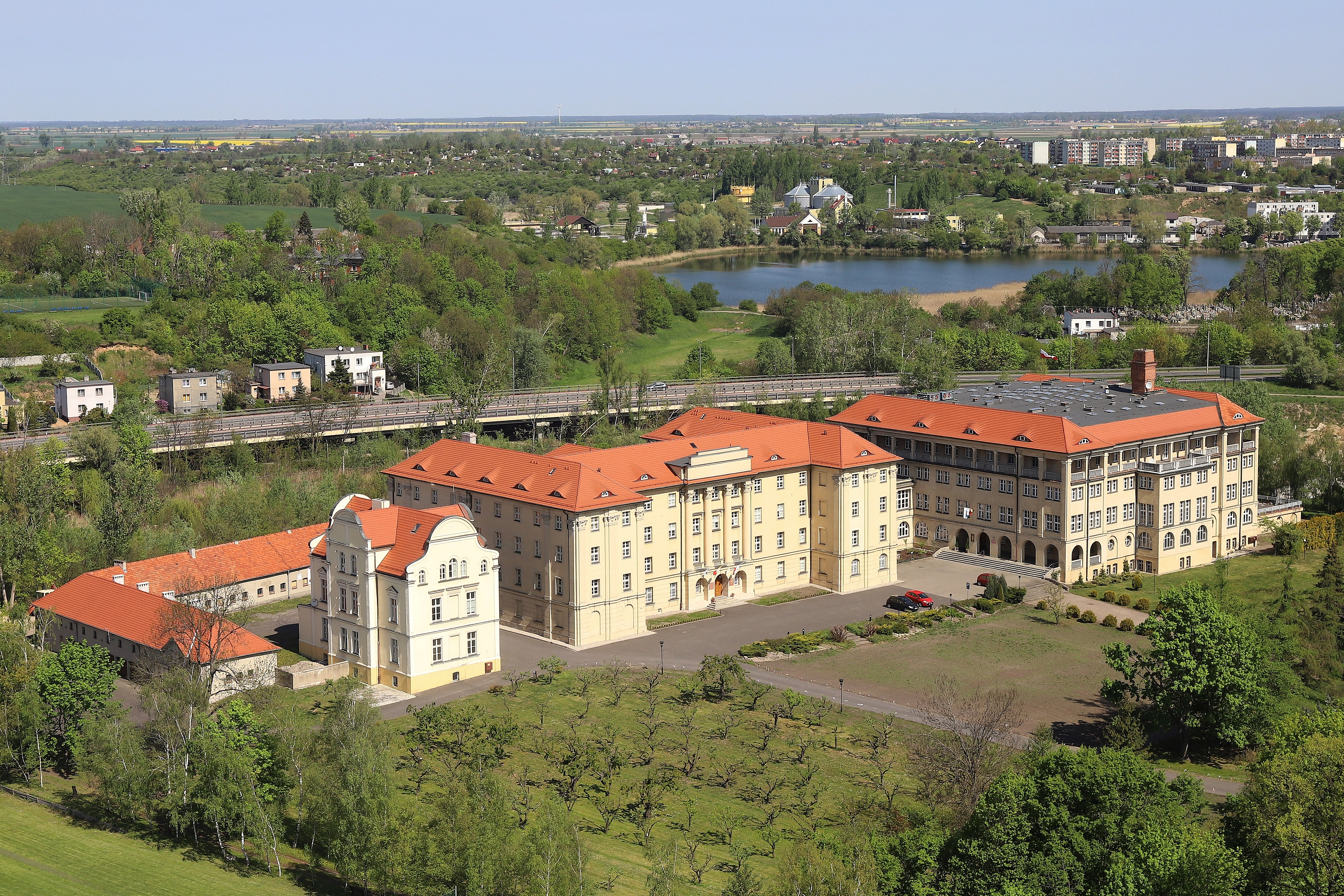
Primate's Higher Theological Seminary

- Collegium Europaeum Gnesnense (part of Adam Mickiewicz University in Poznań)
- The Gniezno School of Humanism and Management - Millennium (Gnieźnieńska Wyższa Szkoła Humanistyczno-Menedżerska Millennium)
- Primate's Higher Theological Seminary (Prymasowskie Wyższe Seminarium Duchowne)
- The State Vocational College in Gniezno (Państwowa Wyższa Szkoła Zawodowa)

== Arts and culture ==
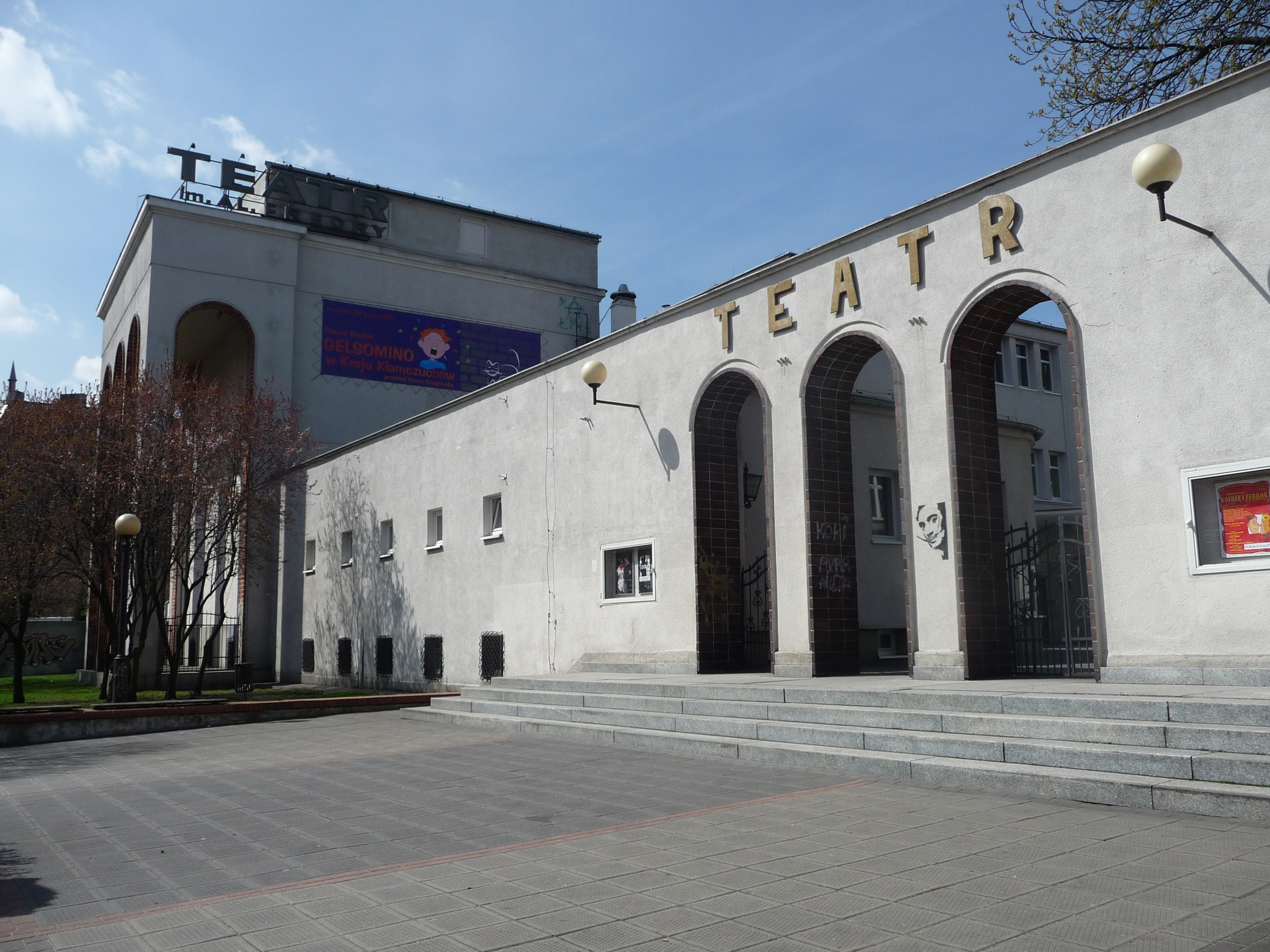
Aleksander Fredro Theatre

- Aleksander Fredro Theatre (Teatr im. A. Fredry)
- Museum of the Polish State Origins (Muzeum Początków Państwa Polskiego)
- Museum of Archdiocese (Muzeum Archidiecezji Gnieźnieńskiej)

== Sports ==
The city's most popular sports club is motorcycle speedway team Start Gniezno. The annual speedway Bolesław Chrobry Tournament is held in Gniezno. The city's main football club is Mieszko Gniezno. The E11 European long distance path for hikers passes through Gniezno.

== Notable people ==
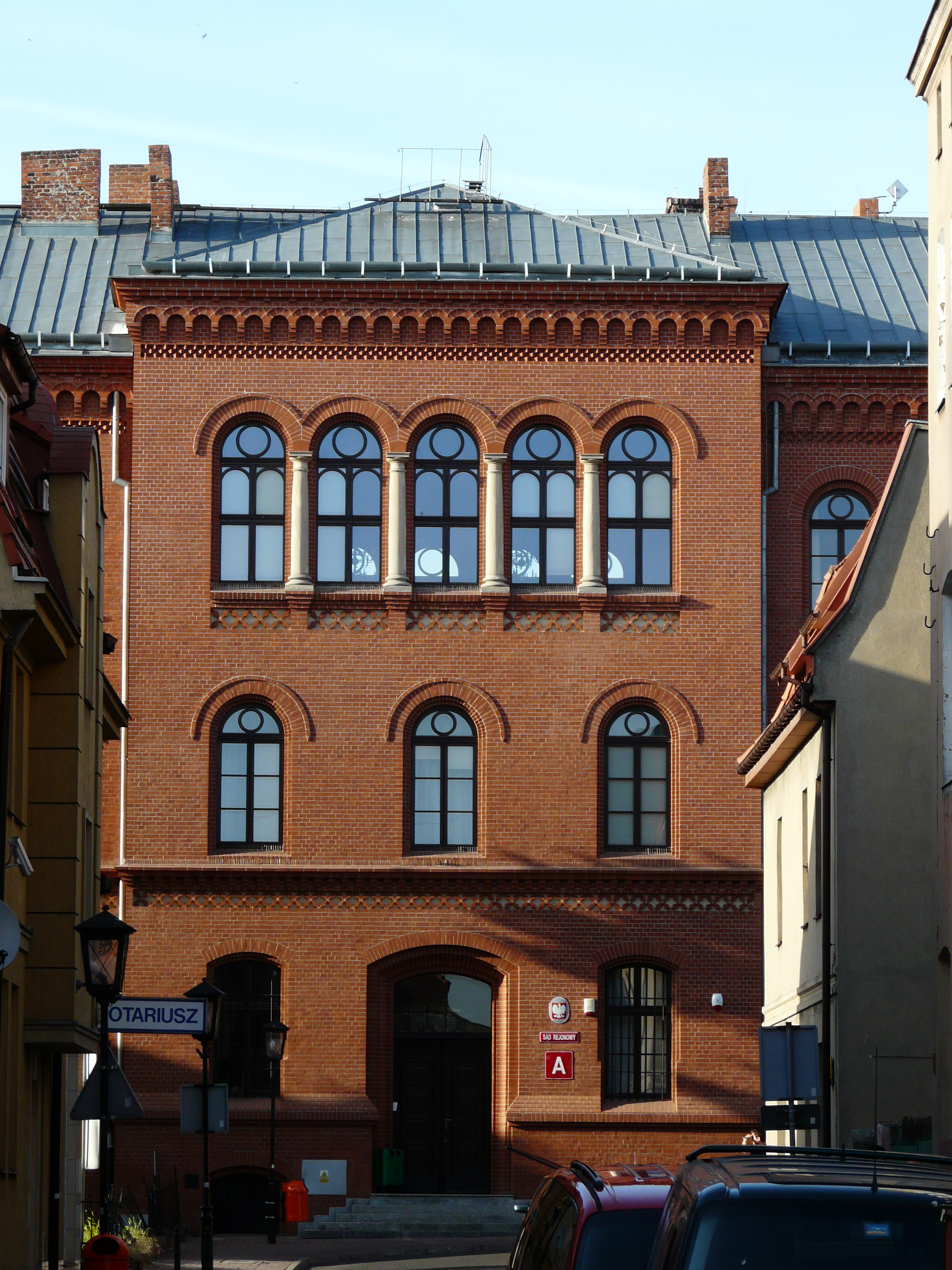
Regional court

- Maria Springer (1824–1872), Polish poet
- Hermann Senator (1834–1911), German-Jewish physician
- Jacob Caro (1836–1904), German historian
- Ludwik Ćwikliński (1853–1942), Polish classical philologist
- Felix Waldstein (1862–1943), German liberal politician
- Kurt Jahnke (1882–1950), German-American intelligence agent
- Günther Pancke (1889–1973), German SS-Obergruppenführer and war criminal
- Aleksy Sobaszek (1895–1942), Beatified Polish Roman Catholic priest
- Heinz Reinefarth (1903–1979), German SS-Gruppenführer and war criminal
- Józef Kut (1905–1942), Beatified Polish Roman Catholic priest
- Alfons Flinik (1926–2003), Polish field hockey player
- Henryk Flinik (1928-2008), Polish field hockey player
- Paweł Arndt (born 1954), Polish politician
- Arkadiusz Radomski (born 1977), Polish footballer
- Łukasz Kuropaczewski (born 1981), Polish musical artist
- Grzegorz Hyży (born 1987), Polish singer-songwriter
- Łukasz Cieślewicz (born 1987), Polish footballer
- Marika Popowicz-Drapała (born 1988), Polish track and field athlete
- Kacper Gomólski (born 1993), Polish speedway rider

== Twin towns – sister cities ==
Gniezno is twinned with:

- Anagni, Italy
- Esztergom, Hungary
- Falkenberg, Sweden
- Saint-Malo, France
- Speyer, Germany
- Radviliškis, Lithuania
- Uman, Ukraine
- Veendam, Netherlands

Former twin towns:

- Sergiyev Posad, Russia

In March 2022, Gniezno severed its ties with the Russian city of Sergiyev Posad as a response to the 2022 Russian invasion of Ukraine.

== See also ==
- Gniezno Cathedral
- History of Poland
- Adalbert of Prague
- Royal coronations in Gniezno cathedral
- Gniezno Doors
- Archdiocese of Gniezno
