= Dalki, Gniezno =

District of the city of Gniezno, Poland

Dalki
- District of Gniezno
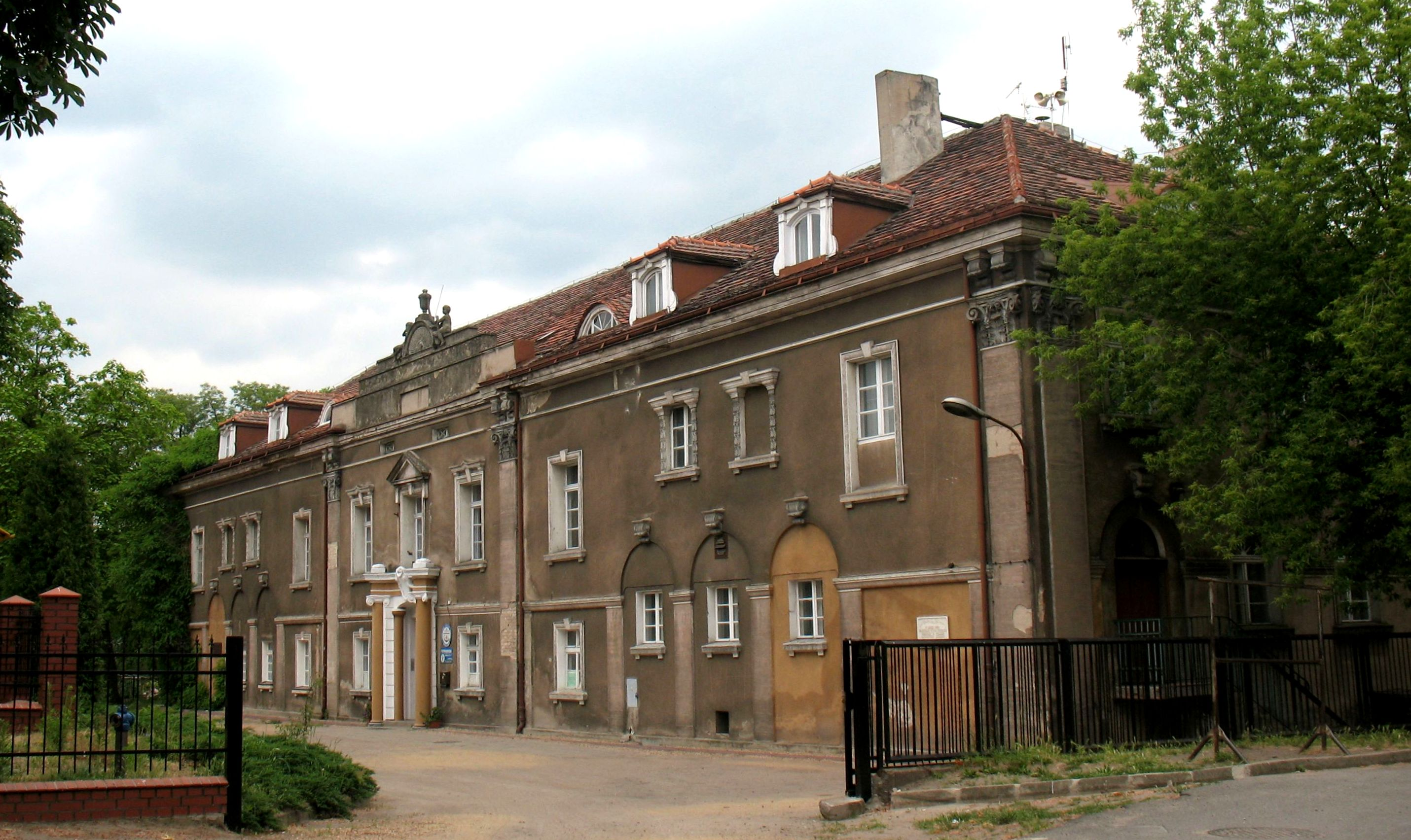
- Former folk high school

- Location within Poland
- Coordinates: 52°31′N 17°35′E
- Country: Poland
- Voivodeship: Greater Poland
- County/City: Gniezno
- Time zone: UTC+1 (CET)
  - Summer (DST): UTC+2 (CEST)
- Vehicle registration: PGN

Dalki [ˈdalkʲi] is a district of Gniezno, Poland, located in the western part of the city.

== History ==
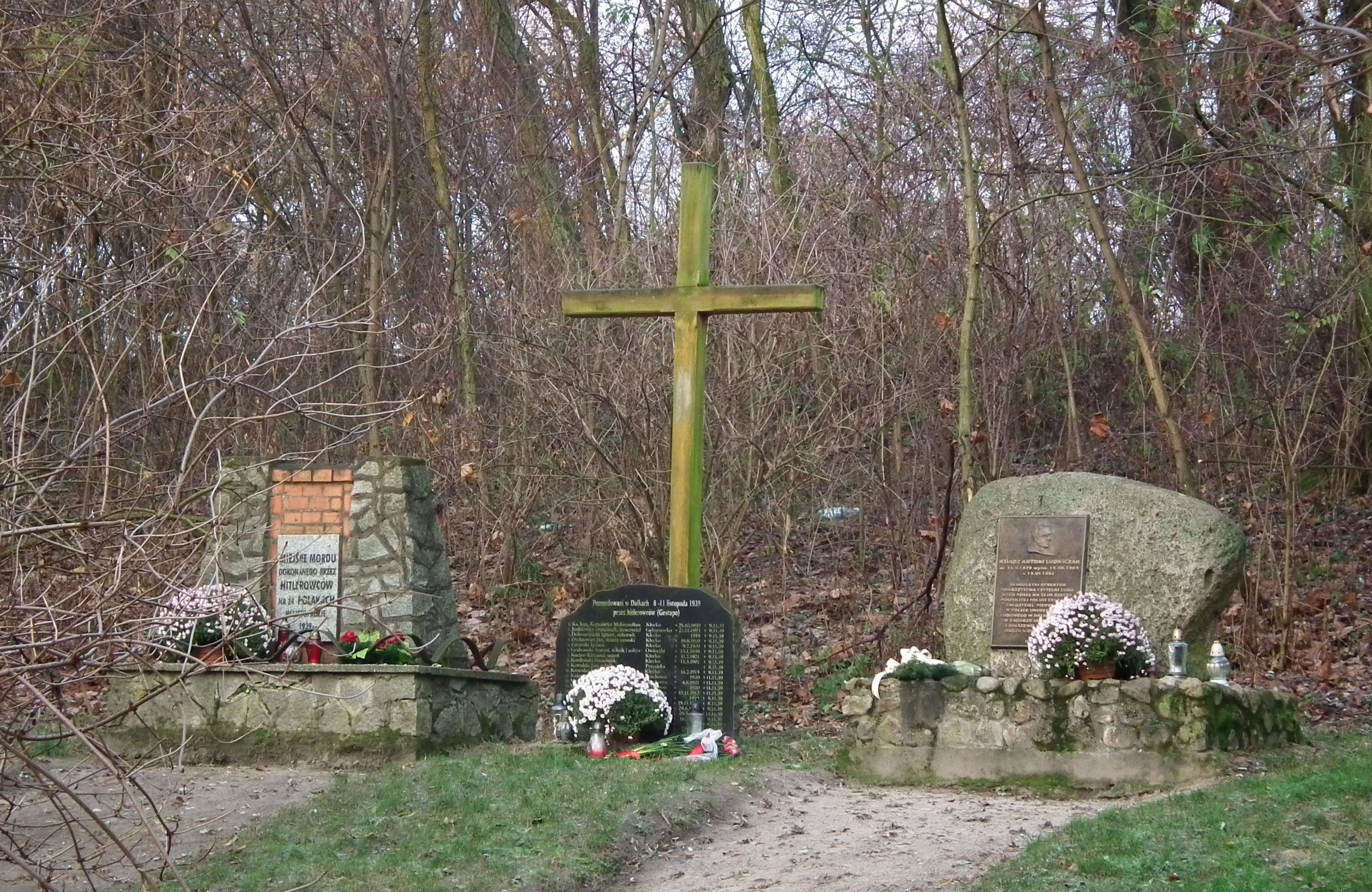
Memorial at the site of a German execution of 24 Poles in November 1939

In 1921 the first Polish folk high school was established in Dalki.

During the German occupation of Poland (World War II), on 7 November 1939, the occupiers carried out a massacre of 24 Poles, whom they previously imprisoned in Gniezno, including 10 defenders of the nearby town of Kłecko (see Nazi crimes against the Polish nation). There is a memorial at the site.
