= Lednica =

Lednica may refer to:

- Lednica (lake) in western Poland, site of annual religious gatherings
  - Lednica Landscape Park, a protected area in the region of Lednica lake
- Lednica, Opole Voivodeship (south-west Poland)
- Lednica, Púchov District, a village and municipality in Slovakia
- Lednica 2000, a yearly Catholic youth meeting

== See also ==
- Lednice
