= Lake Lednica Wooden Face =

Rare Slavic Pagan Wood Sculpture discovered in Poland, 2024

- Material: Oak
- Length: 1.34 meters
- Created: circa 967
- Discovered: Ostrów Lednicki, Lake Lednica, Poland
- Culture: Piast dynasty

The Lake Lednica Wooden Face is an oak beam sculpture with a carved human face dated to the 10th century discovered 2024 in the island of Ostrów Lednicki in Lake Lednica, Poland.

Dated to circa 967 when the tree got felled, it is considered a rare example of Slavic sculpture, the earliest surviving of its kind in the area as wooden artifacts would normally decompose.

== Description and discovery ==
Ostrów Lednicki is long believed to present the seat of the Piast dynasty, and around that time, a gród was formed on the island, which consisted of the palace, chapel, a church and a military garrison.

It is also considered the cradle of Christianity in Poland; on 14 April 966, Holy Saturday, the reigning duke, Mieszko I, was baptized in what would be the Baptism of Poland.

The wooden figure was believed to be cut in the year 967 with lab dating of the wood (with a possible earliest date of 959). In alignment of its history, it is believed that this presents the transitional period between Slavic paganism and the Christian period.

Since 1982, the Ostrów Lednicki site is considered the longest-running archaeological excavation of Poland run by the Nicolaus Copernicus University in Toruń's Underwater Archaeology Division. In 2021, drier than usual summers and lowered water levels of Lake Lednica initiated excavations of the wooden debris of the garrison. In 2024, the shape of the sculpture was noticed by the excavation team and extracted. It was determined to be a wooden hook, which held serbed as the frame of the ramparts and prevented the walls from falling apart from the pressure of the filling material, similar to other Piast forts in Poznań and Gniezno. The face was oriented to the outside the gród, facing the lake.

Most often the hooks from other forts were devoid of features and heavily damaged. Conservation of the hook, including the cleaning of the wood revealed a 13.5 by 10 cm sized human face to an otherwise 1.34 meters long beam, carved with combined bas-relief and full body sculpture. Few similar examples exist, discovered in Wolin and Saint Petersburg, Russia.

The discovery was announced officially by the excavation team on 10 July 2025. Pending further conservation, including moisturization to prevent deterioration by cracking, the face is expected to be displayed in late 2026 at the Museum of the First Piast Dynasty in Lednica.
