= Jan Góra =

Polish Dominican, Roman Catholic priest, Doctor of Theology, academic and chaplain

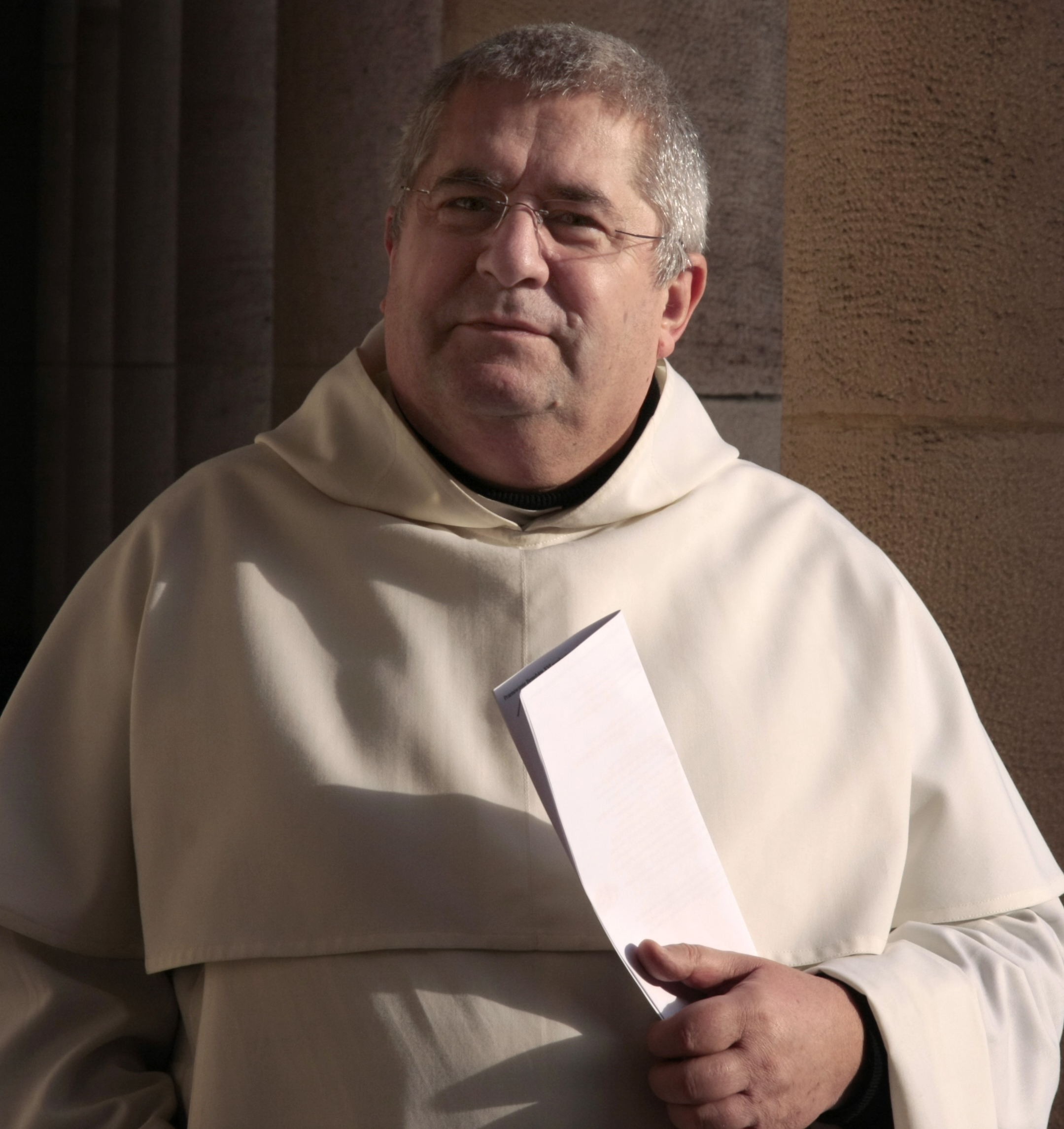
- Jan Góra, 2010

Personal life
- Born: Jan Wojciech Góra; February 8, 1948 Prudnik, Poland
- Died: December 21, 2015 (aged 67) Poznań, Poland
- Cause of death: Cardiac arrest

Religious life
- Religion: Roman Catholicism
- Order: Dominican Order
- Ordination: 8 June 1974

Jan Wojciech Góra OP (8 February 1948 – 21 December 2015) was a Dominican Roman Catholic priest, Doctor of Theology, academic and chaplain. Since 1997, he had been the organiser of the Polish Youth Meeting Lednica 2000 at the Lednica Fields and the Primate Days in Prudnik dedicated to the cardinal Stefan Wyszyński. Animator for the academic chaplaincy centre "Respublica Dominicana" in Jamna. Author of numerous books and articles.

== Life ==
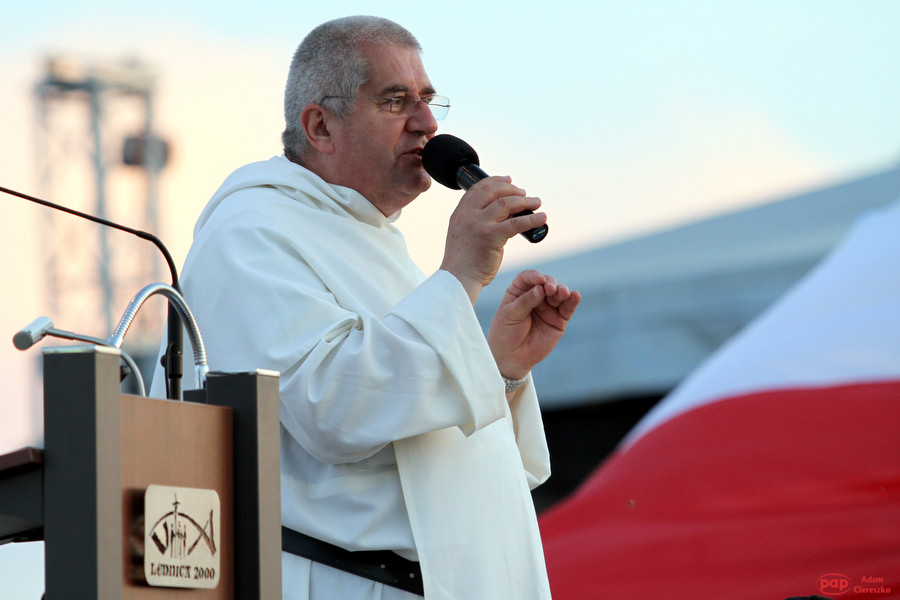
Góra during the Lednica 2000 meeting, 2010

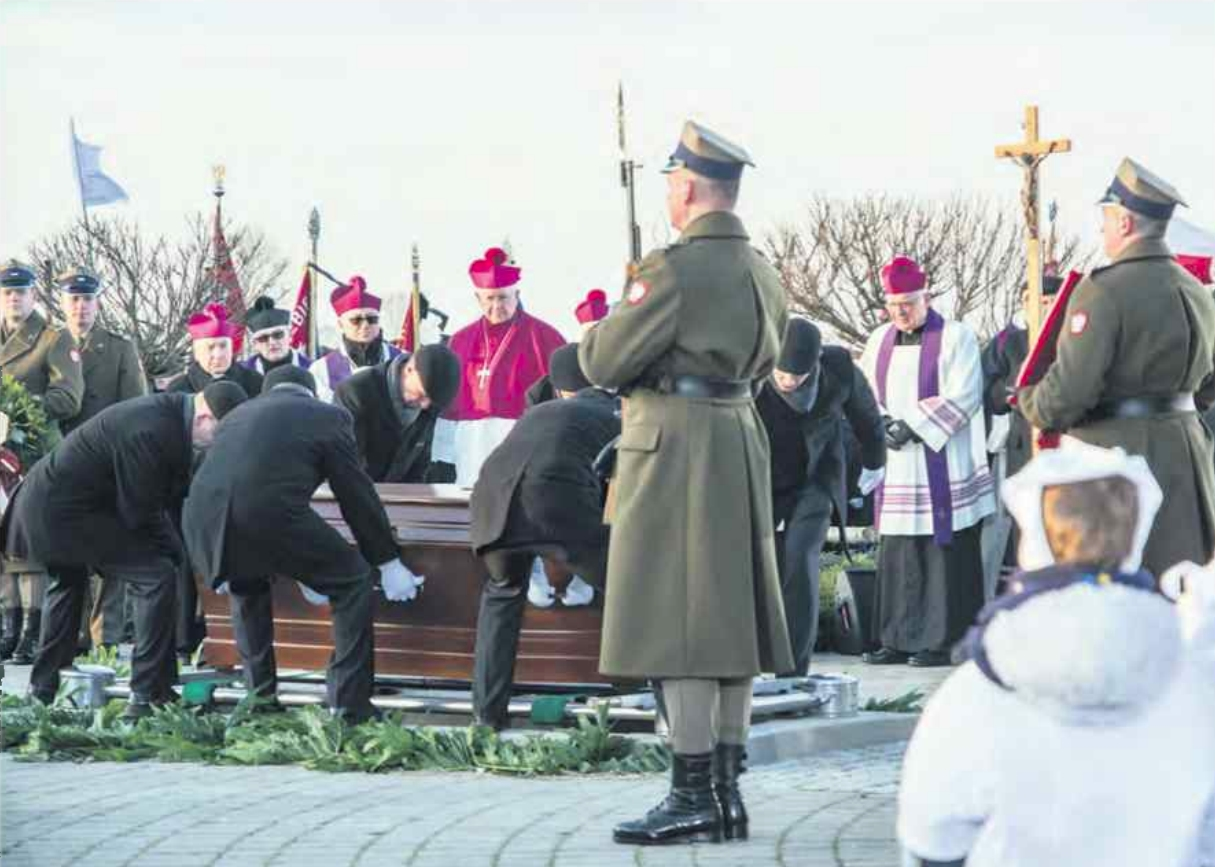
Jan Góra's funeral

He was born in Prudnik. His father, Stanisław, worked as an accountant in the Zakłady Przemysłu Bawełnianego "Frotex". He had two brothers: Roman and Stanisław. One of his family members was Marian Plezia. He went to 1st Public Gymnasium and Adam Mickiewicz High School in Prudnik.

In 1966, he entered the Dominican Order in the St. Michael's Church in Prudnik; during the years 1967-1974, he studied at the Dominican College of Philosophy and Theology in Kraków. During the years 1977-1987, he was chaplain to secondary school pupils in Poznań and since 1987 he was an academic chaplain in Poznań at the Queen of the Holy Rosary church.

His first evangelising work was the annual summer youth colloquia in Ustronie-Hermanice. In 1991, he was co-organizer of the VI World Youth Days at Jasna Góra. It was then that the words of the hymn entitled "Abba Ojcze" were composed for this meeting. During the winter of 1992, he set up the "Dom Świętego Jacka" – a chaplaincy centre on the Jamna Mountain near Tarnów. Initially the "School of Faith" started in the old building of the school and later on, due to the personal intervention of Pope John Paul II, he built the Sanctuary of Our Lady of Unfailing Hope.

In 1997, he organized for the first time the Polish Youth Meeting Lednica 2000 nearby the Lednica Lake near Gniezno. Since that time youth meetings by the Fish-Gate have taken place, initially on the Eve of Pentecost and now on the first Saturday of June. Since 2004, annually, at the beginning of September, he also organizes Lednica for Seniors. He is founder of the Museum of the history of Lednica in Poznań and of the John Paul II House on the Lednica Fields. On 21 December 2015, he died at the age of 67 in Poznań.

Father Jan Góra propagates the idea of Small Nations, works closely with many Catholic and cultural publications and publishing houses.

== Lednica 2000 ==
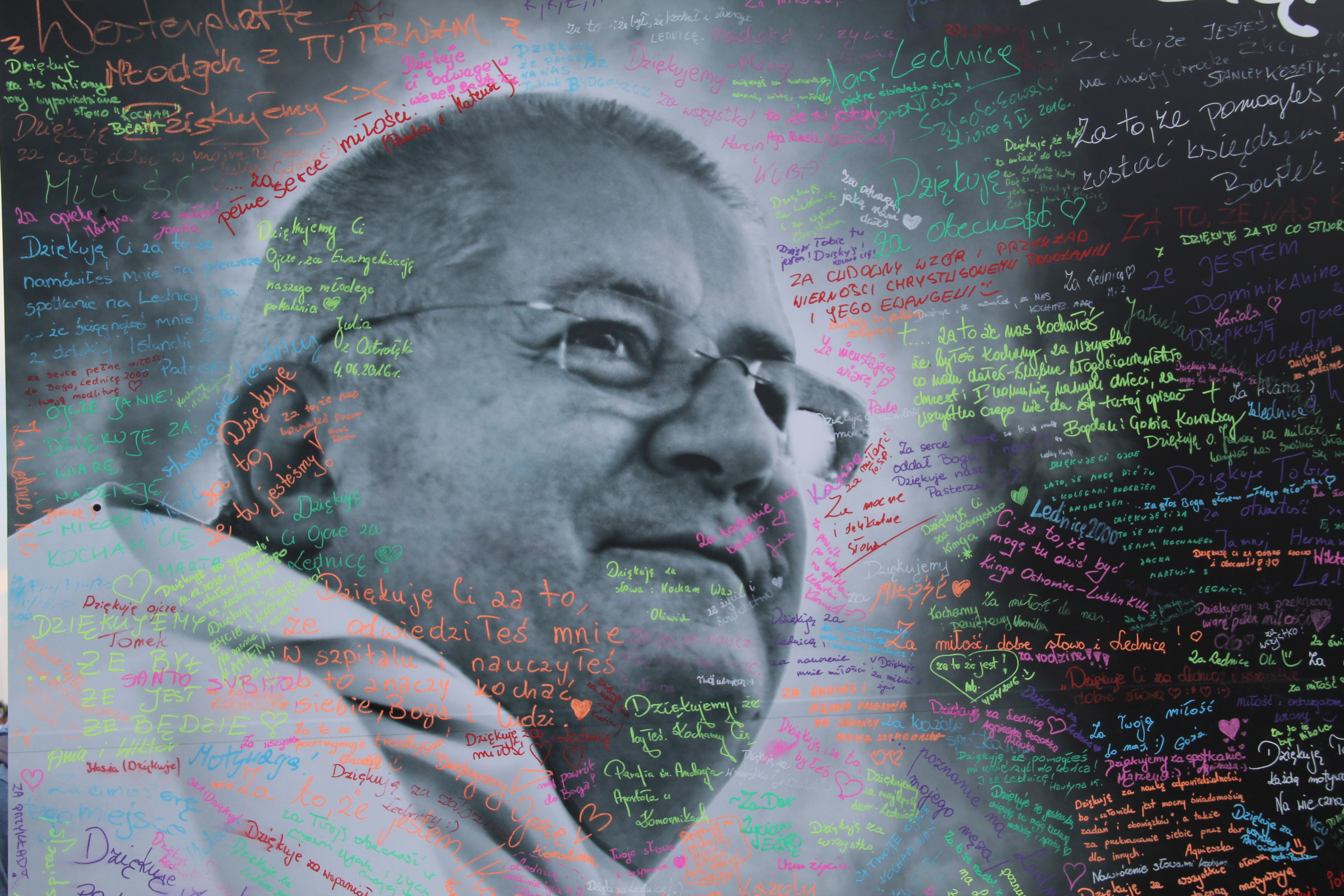
A thank you plaque to Jan Góra

The Poland-wide Youth Meeting Lednica 2000 is an annual gathering of Polish Catholic youth, organized near Gniezno in Pola Lednickie (near the Lednica lake, which is believed to be the place where the first Polish monarch, Mieszko I was baptized in 966). It is the largest regular religious youth meeting in the world (with exception of those attended by the Pope).

Lednica gatherings were initiated in 1997 by Jan Góra. Since then, they are organized every year and always take place on the first Saturday of June.

Pope John Paul II sent an annual special message to participants of Lednica. This tradition was continued by his successor, Benedict XVI. After his papal resignation, the tradition is continued by pope Francis.

== Criticism ==
During the 2005 Polish parliamentary election, Jan Góra took part in the election campaign of the Law and Justice candidate to the Senate, Przemysław Alexandrowicz. After a TV commercial with his participation was broadcast by TVP3 Poznań, Góra explained that he did not recommend Alexandrowicz, but gave him references because he had known him for 28 years. Góra caused consternation in the authorities of the Dominican order with his participation in the election campaign.

Right-wing circles criticized the Lednica meetings organized by Góra, accusing them of being theatrical and infantile, and of upsetting the proportions between a prayer meeting and a music concert. As a result, the Lednica meetings, as well as Jan Góra himself, were accused of disturbing the "purity of the liturgy" and of "non-liturgical behavior".

== Awards ==
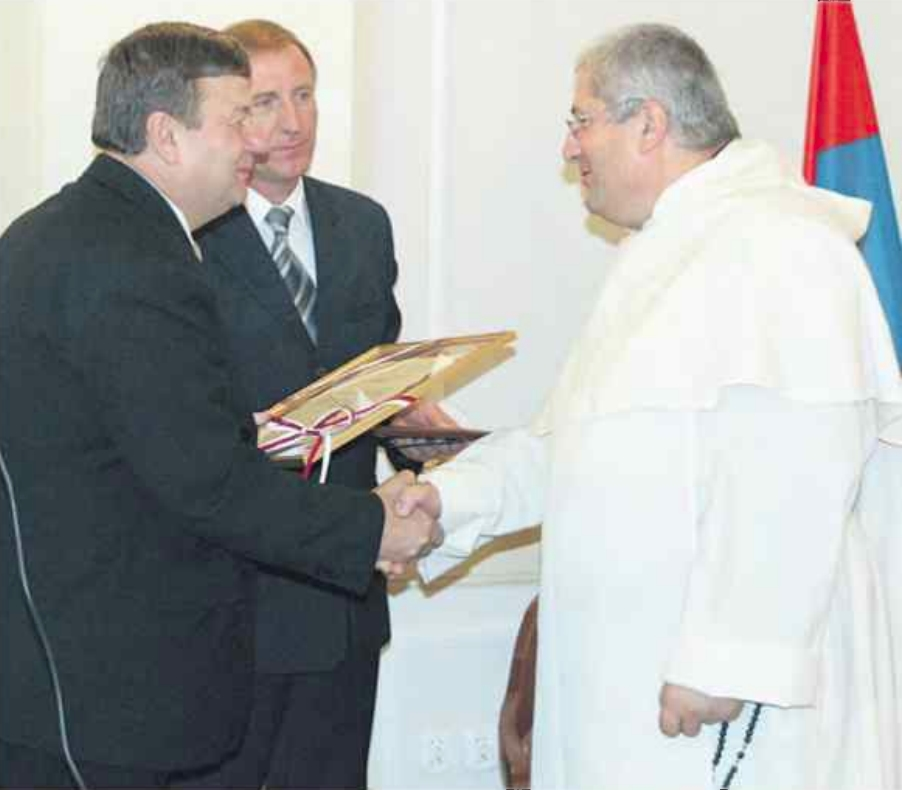
Jan Góra receiving the "Honorary Citizen of Prudnik Town" award, 2008

He has received numerous prizes and honours for his work up to now:

- 1983 – Literary Prize Kościelskich in Geneva for the book "Mój dom"
- 1996 – distinction in "Małe Ojczyzny. Tradycja dla przyszłości" contest
- 1997 – "GIGANT 97", Gazeta Wyborcza prize
- 1998 – Honorary Citizenship of Zakliczyn nad Dunajcem Gmina
- 1999 – Włodzimierz Pietrzak Prize
- 2001 – Honorary Member of Poznań Town
- 2001 – Piotr Wawrzyniak Prize
- 2003 – Prize of "Głos Wielkopolski" and Great Seal of Poznań Town
- 2005 – TOTUS prize from the Polish Episcopate
- 2007 – "Honorary Citizen of Poznań Town"
- 2008 – Poznań Television Creator Prize.
- 2008 – "Honorary Citizen of Prudnik Town"
- 2009 – "Honorary Citizen of Tarnów County"
- 2010 – European Citizens' Prize
- 2011 – Order of Polonia Restituta Third Class
- 2015 – Order of Polonia Restituta First Class
- 2016 – Decoration of Honor of Prudnik County
