= Christianization of Moravia =

Spread of Christianity in medieval Moravia

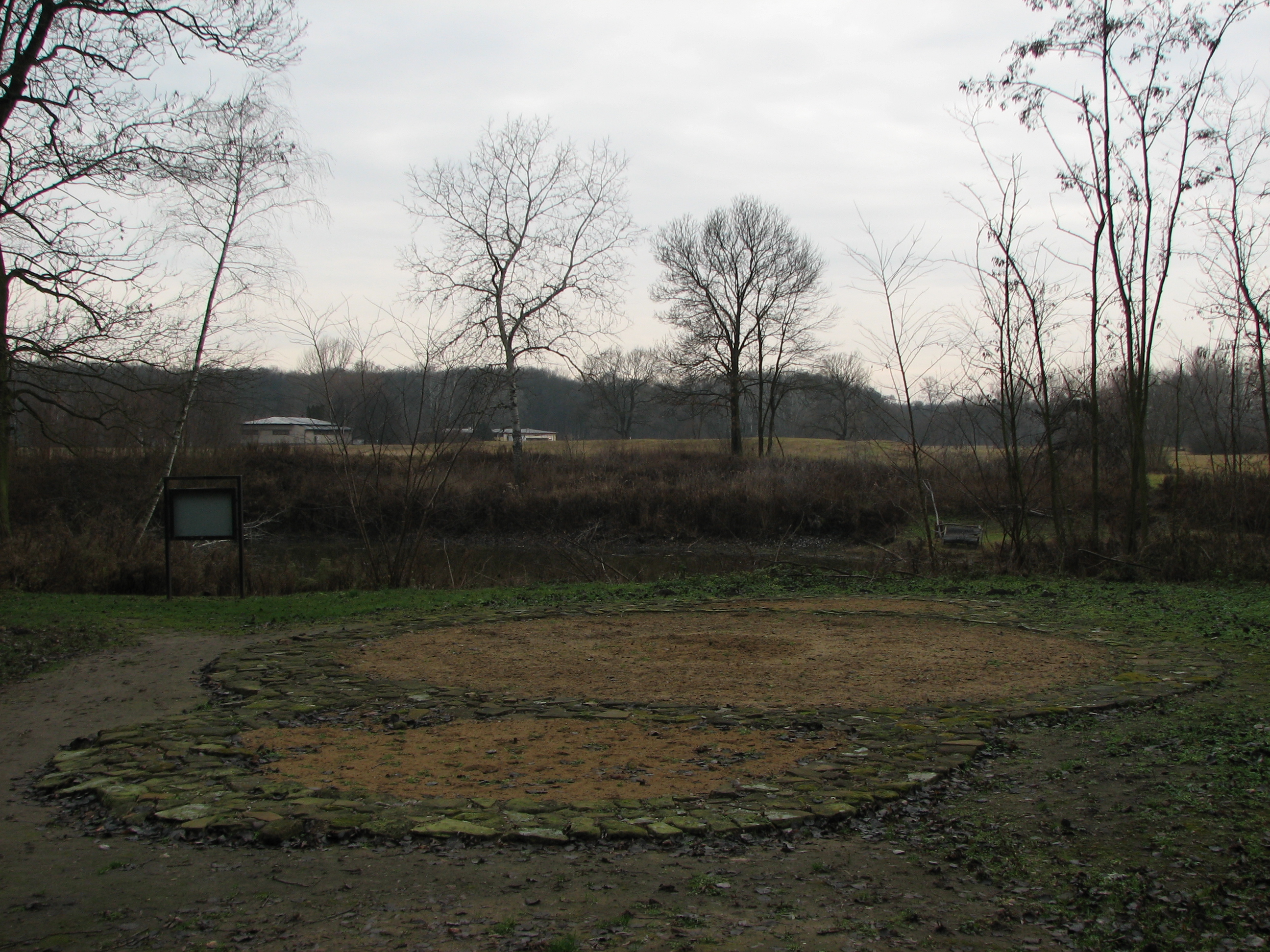
Remnants of a church from the period of Great Moravia at the Mikulčice-Valy heritage site.

The Christianization of Moravia refers to the spread of the Christian religion in the lands of medieval Moravia (Great Moravia).

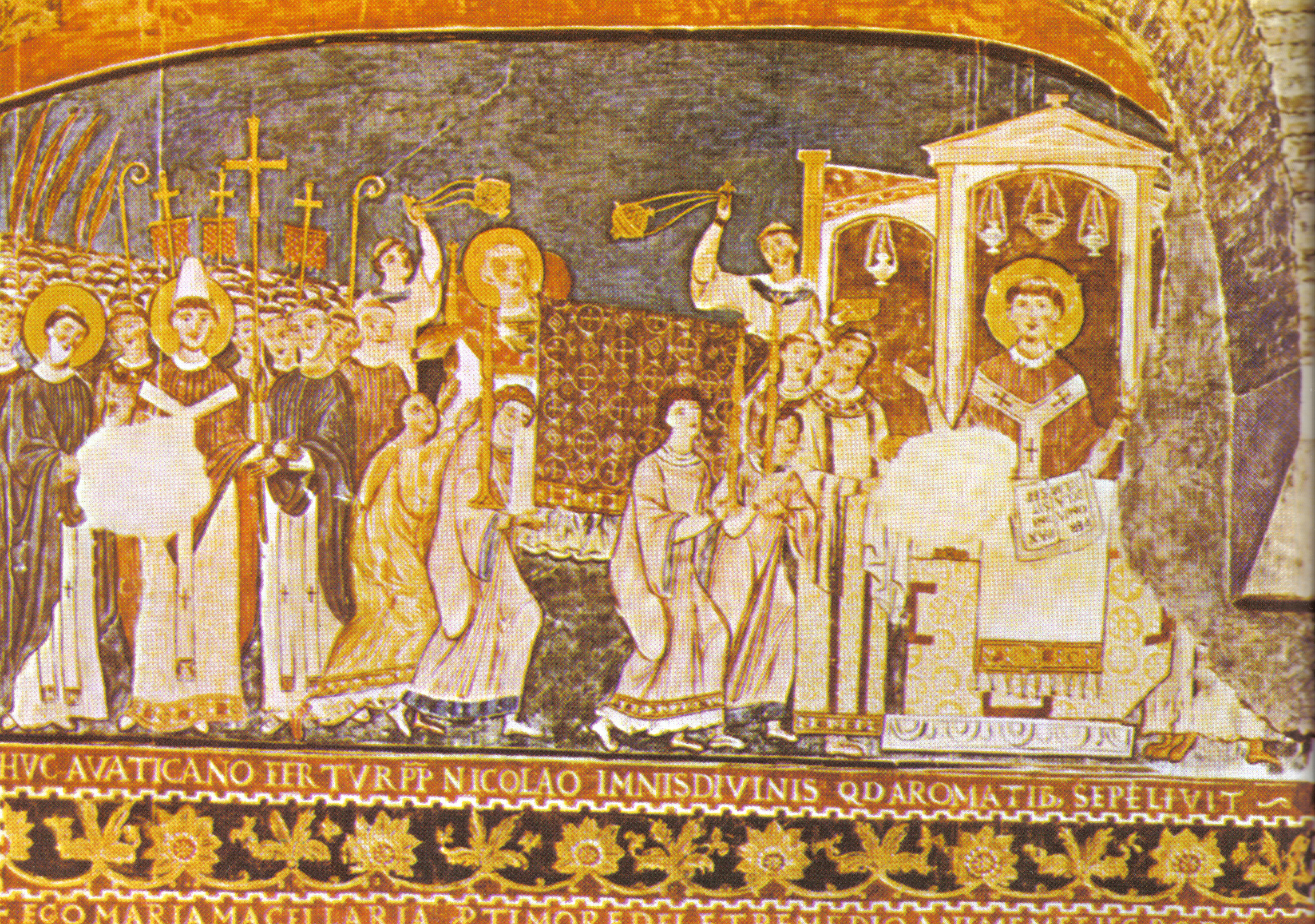
Constantine and Methodius in Rome, 11th century fresco

What modern historians designate as Great Moravia was a Slavic state that existed in Central Europe from around 830 to the early 10th century. The territory of Great Moravia was originally evangelized by missionaries coming from the Frankish Empire or Byzantine enclaves in Italy and Dalmatia since the early 8th century and sporadically earlier. The diocese of Passau was charged with establishing a church structure in Moravia. The first Christian church of the Western and Eastern Slavs known to the written sources was built in 828 by Pribina, the ruler and Prince of the Principality of Nitra, although probably still a pagan himself, in his possession called Nitrava (today Nitra, Slovakia). The first Moravian ruler known by name, Mojmír I, was baptized in 831 by Reginhar, Bishop of Passau. Due to internal struggles between Moravian rulers, Mojmir was deposed by Rastislav in 846; as Mojmir was aligned with Frankish Catholicism, Rastislav asked for support from the Byzantine Empire and aligned himself with Eastern Orthodoxy.

Despite the formal endorsement by the elites, the Great Moravian Christianity was described as containing many pagan elements as late as in 852. The major milestone in the Christianization of Moravia is traditionally attributed to the influence of Byzantine missionary brothers, Saints Cyril and Methodius, who arrived in Moravia in the year 863. Cyril translated the liturgy and the pericopes into the Slavic language (their translation became the foundation of the Old Church Slavonic language), giving rise to the popular Slavic church, quickly surpassing the previously struggling Roman Catholic missions with their foreign German priests and Latin liturgy. A few years later, the nearby Duchy of Bohemia was also converted, with its ruler Bořivoj I baptised in 867. (the Christianization of Moravia would also affect Poland, which was Christianized a century later, and where Moravian missionaries were among the early evangelizers). Soon Rastislav succeeded in created a church independent of both the Germans and Constantinople, subordinated directly to the See of Rome. New diocese of Pannonia was inaugurated, with Methodius as its first archbishop.

After the death of Rastislav successor, Svatopluk I (who expelled the disciples of Methodius from Moravia in 886 thus effectively ending the existence of Slavonic liturgy in his realm) Moravia was partitioned between its neighbours (Bohemia and Hungary) and the Slavic church went into decline, replaced by the churches better established in those other territories. Nevertheless, a number of expelled Slavic church clerics and scholars found refuge in Bulgaria, where their teachings, liturgical and literacy traditions were successfully incorporated into the early Bulgarian Orthodox Church and formed in great extent the medieval Bulgarian culture.

== See also ==
- Christianization of the Slavs

== Literature ==
- Hanuliak, Milan; Pieta, Karol (2014). "9th century movable material evidence of Christianisation in the eastern parts of Great Moravia". The Cyril and Methodius Mission and Europe: 1150 Years Since the Arrival of the Thessaloniki Brothers in Great Moravia. pp. 138–151. ISBN 978-80-86023-51-9. OS LG 2023-08-18.
- Jaworski, Krzysztof (2014). "Christian Great Moravia and Silesian lands at the turn of the 9th and 10th centuries". The Cyril and Methodius Mission and Europe: 1150 Years Since the Arrival of the Thessaloniki Brothers in Great Moravia. pp. 172–181. ISBN 978-80-86023-51-9. OS LG 2023-08-18.
- Kouřil, Pavel (2014). "Archaeological evidence of Christianity in relics of material culture of the 9th and 10th centuries in Moravia with focus on crosses". The Cyril and Methodius Mission and Europe: 1150 Years Since the Arrival of the Thessaloniki Brothers in Great Moravia. pp. 102–113. ISBN 978-80-86023-51-9. OS LG 2023-08-18.
- Měřínský, Zdeněk (2014). "Paganism and the origins of Christianity in Moravia and Silesia". The Cyril and Methodius Mission and Europe: 1150 Years Since the Arrival of the Thessaloniki Brothers in Great Moravia. pp. 48–67. ISBN 978-80-86023-51-9. OS LG 2023-08-18.
- Žemlička, Josef (2014). "The Christianization and State Formation Process in Central Europe". The Cyril and Methodius Mission and Europe: 1150 Years Since the Arrival of the Thessaloniki Brothers in Great Moravia. pp. 22–27. ISBN 978-80-86023-51-9. OS LG 2023-08-18.
