= Church of Blessed Michał Kozal, Gniezno =

Church in Gniezno, Poland

Church of Blessed Michał Kozal
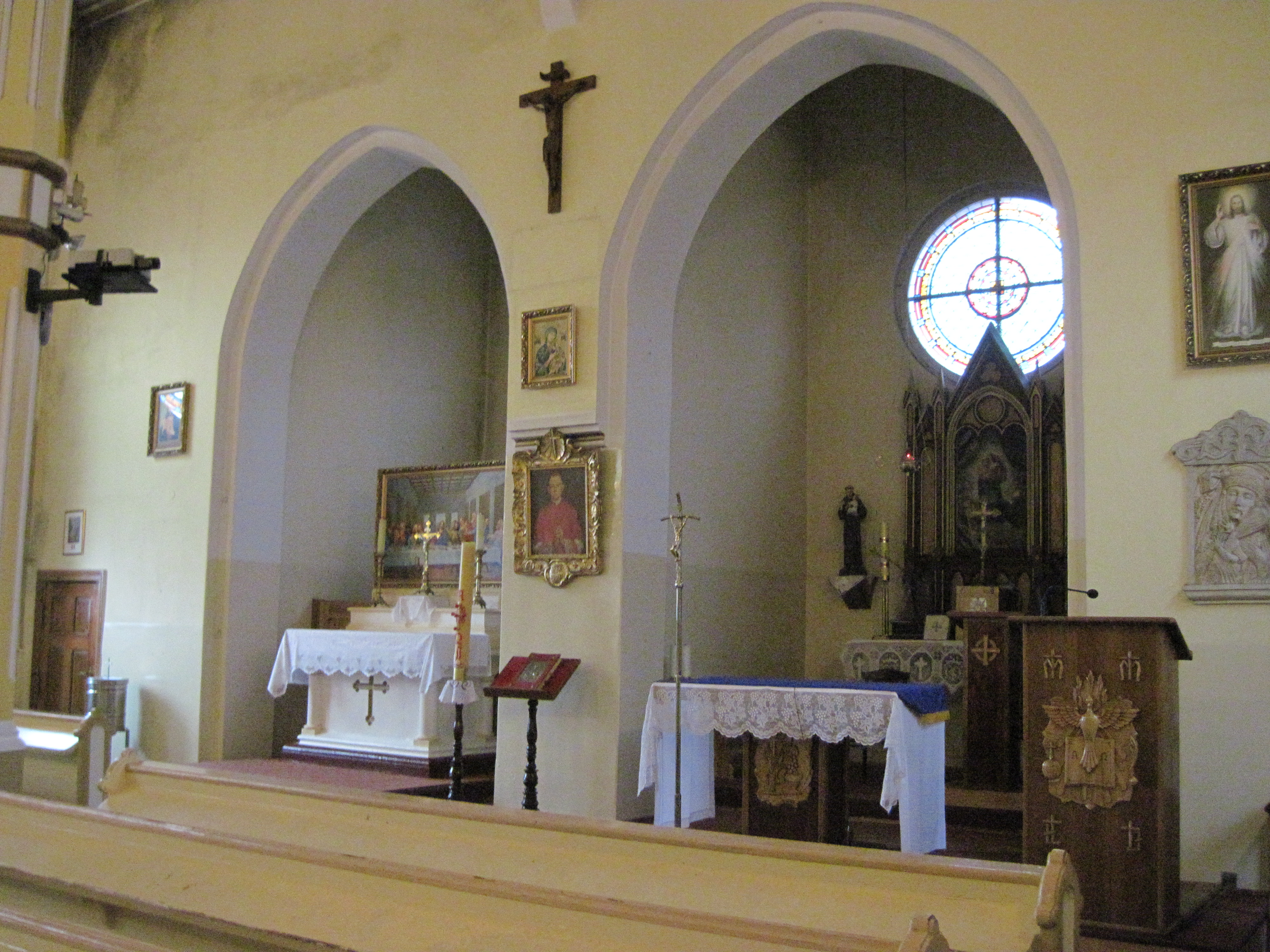
- Chancel of the church
- Church of Blessed Michał Kozal
- 52°32′01.0″N 17°34′32.0″E
- Location: Gniezno
- Country: Poland
- Denomination: Catholic; Protestant
- Churchmanship: Latin Church; Evangelical Church of the Augsburg Confession in Poland

History
- Dedication: Michał Kozal

Architecture
- Architect: Bruno
- Style: Gothic Revival
- Completed: 1895
- Closed: February 7, 2012

Specifications
- Materials: brick

Administration
- Parish: Parish of Blessed Michał Kozal

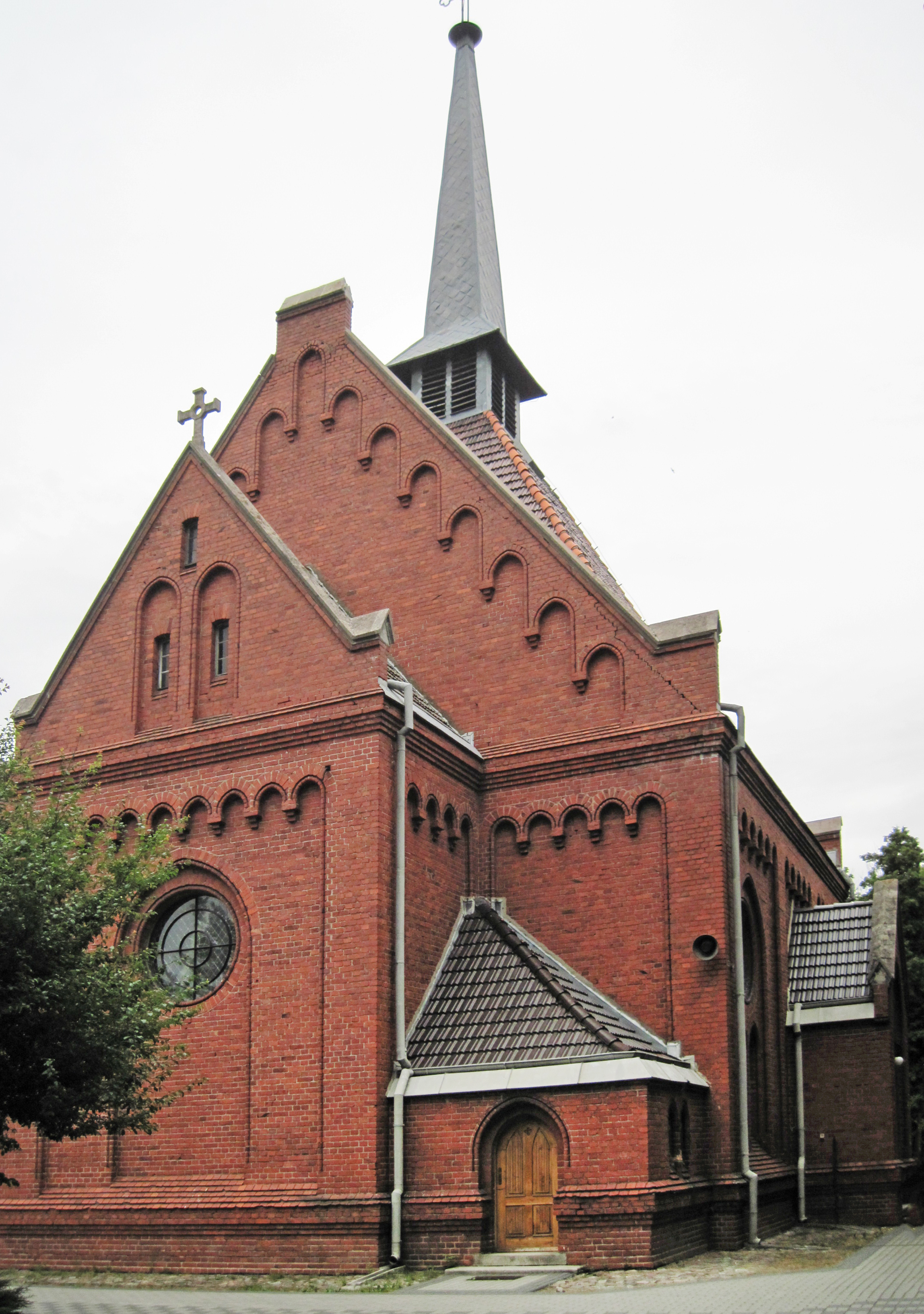
Structure of the church – view of the western side of the temple with the boiler room doors and the southern entrance, known as the entrance from the hospital side (July 2010)

Church of Blessed Michał Kozal is a Gothic Revival church built between 1894 and 1895, designed by Bruno (likely Bruno Schulz, a German architect) as a chapel for the Dziekanka Psychiatric Hospital. It currently serves as the church of the Catholic Parish of Blessed Michał Kozal in Gniezno, while also being used by the Evangelical parish from Poznań (simultaneous church). The temple features two chancels. It has been temporarily closed since 7 February 2012.

== History ==
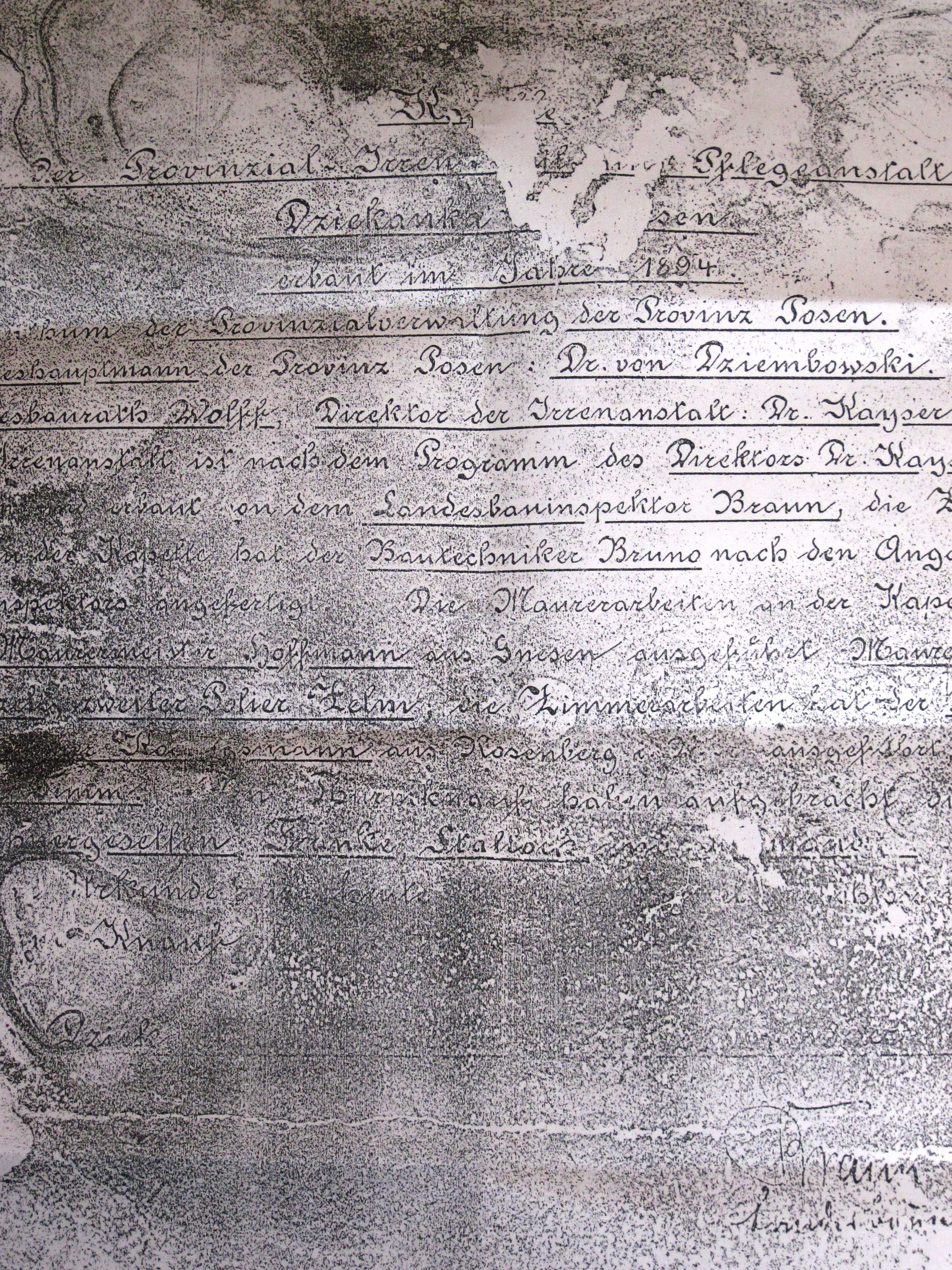
Copy of a document found in the church tower

The church was constructed in 1894. According to a document found in its tower, the masonry work was carried out by master mason Hoffman from Gniezno, master Kinzell, and master Zelm, while the carpentry was handled by a construction contractor from Rosenberg and assistant master Timm. Originally, the church served as a chapel for the Dziekanka Psychiatric Hospital, though it was intended from the outset as a dual-denomination temple. By decree of Primate August Hlond, it became a filial church of the Parish of the Assumption of the Blessed Virgin Mary and St. Adalbert (archcathedral). On 1 January 1988, by decree of Primate Józef Glemp, it was designated the church of the newly established Parish of Blessed Michał Kozal.

After Father Sławomir Jessa assumed the role of parson in 1997, the church underwent systematic renovations (confessionals and lighting were replaced, and painting work was completed). In the late 1990s, the church tower was renovated, funded by both parishioners and members of the Evangelical community. On 23 March 2009, during a Chaplet of the Divine Mercy service, a fire broke out in the church, caused by soot in the chimney. A year later, during a Gorzkie żale service, old, sealed ducts caused an explosion in the church porch near the hospital-side exit. Two months later, on 29 May, cracks in the ceiling widened, and a bulge appeared above the entrance, threatening collapse. As a result, the church was closed for over a week. Following an inspection by the heritage conservator and temporary ceiling support with beams, it reopened, though it requires a thorough renovation. On 7 February 2012, a serious chimney failure occurred when smoke infiltrated the interior due to a leaky flue. Needing urgent repairs, the church was closed, and most of its liturgical furnishings were moved to the parish chapel and rectory. On 20 December 2012, a notarial deed was signed transferring ownership from the State Treasury to the metropolitan curia, which then relinquished it to the Parish of Blessed Michał Kozal in Gniezno that same day. In June 2013, a burglary resulted in the theft of chandeliers, wall sconces, and other valuable items left after the closure. On 14 October 2013, roof repairs began, partially funded by the Ministry of Culture and National Heritage. By the end of 2014, the roof renovation and installation of new heating were completed, though work was halted twice due to insufficient funding. Since 2015, renovations have remained on hold.

== Architecture ==
Constructed from red brick on a rectangular plan as a single-nave church, it features a tower with an inactive bell, restored in the late 20th century through collaboration between the parson and members of the Evangelical Church of the Augsburg Confession in Poland. On the eastern exterior wall, there is a plaque commemorating hospital patients murdered by Nazis and another honoring Father Witold Ceglarek, a vicar of the parish who died tragically. The church has two church porches and thus two side entrances (lacking a direct entrance facing the altars). Four small rooms are built at the corners: two on the eastern side, connected to the church, and two on the western side, unconnected. The eastern rooms serve as sacristies for the Catholic parish – one for priests and one for liturgical assistants. The western rooms include a boiler room and an unused space. The northern and southern walls feature rose windows, with single circular windows above them, on the choir, and in the chancels.

=== Catholic chancel ===
Located at the eastern wall, alongside the Evangelical chancel, it features a wooden, slightly gilded altar with a copy of the Sistine Madonna and a tabernacle. To the right of the tabernacle is the celebrant's seat, along with spaces for co-celebrants and lectors. Flanking the tabernacle are two statues: St. Francis of Assisi with the Child Jesus on the left and the Merciful Jesus on the right. Gilded candlesticks, stolen in 2013, once stood by the painting, while a silver papal cross at the main wooden altar was moved to the parish chapel after the closure. The chancel is painted white and pale yellow, with the altar and Madonna painting in brown and gold tones.

=== Evangelical chancel ===
More prominent than the Catholic chancel, it features a three-tiered altar, modeled after a pre-Vatican II Catholic design. Behind it hangs a copy of Leonardo da Vinci's The Last Supper.

=== Nave ===
Between the altars, from top to bottom, are a cross, an image of Our Lady of Perpetual Help, and a portrait of Blessed Michał Kozal. Just in front of these were an evangeliary and a paschal candle. Opposite the chancels is the choir loft, formerly equipped with electric organs, now relocated to the parish chapel. Above the wooden pulpit, adorned with an image of the Holy Spirit and located to the right of the Catholic altar, hangs a historic statue of the Virgin Mary with Child, crafted by Jadwiga Boniewska. To the left of the Evangelical altar was an image of the Sacred Heart of Jesus. Also present were a cornerstone blessed by Pope John Paul II and a papal portrait, both transferred to the new chapel in March 2011.

== Evangelical-Augsburg congregation ==
Evangelical services were held on the first Sunday of each month at 3:30 PM. Since the church's closure, they take place in the parish chapel on E. Orzeszkowa Street. Pastoral care for the filial congregation is provided by the Poznań Evangelical-Augsburg Parish. A significant event for both denominations was the first ecumenical service, held during the Week of Prayer for Christian Unity on 19 January 2003, and a service during the 8th Gniezno Convention, attended by faithful and representatives of three Christian churches.
