= Slavic religion (disambiguation) =

Slavic religion the religious beliefs, myths, and ritual practices of the Slavs before Christianisation.

Slavic religion may also refer to:

- Historical and modern Slavic Christianity
- Modern Slavic Native Faith
