= Ostrów Lednicki =

Island in Poland

Coordinates: 52.52667°N 17.37780°E

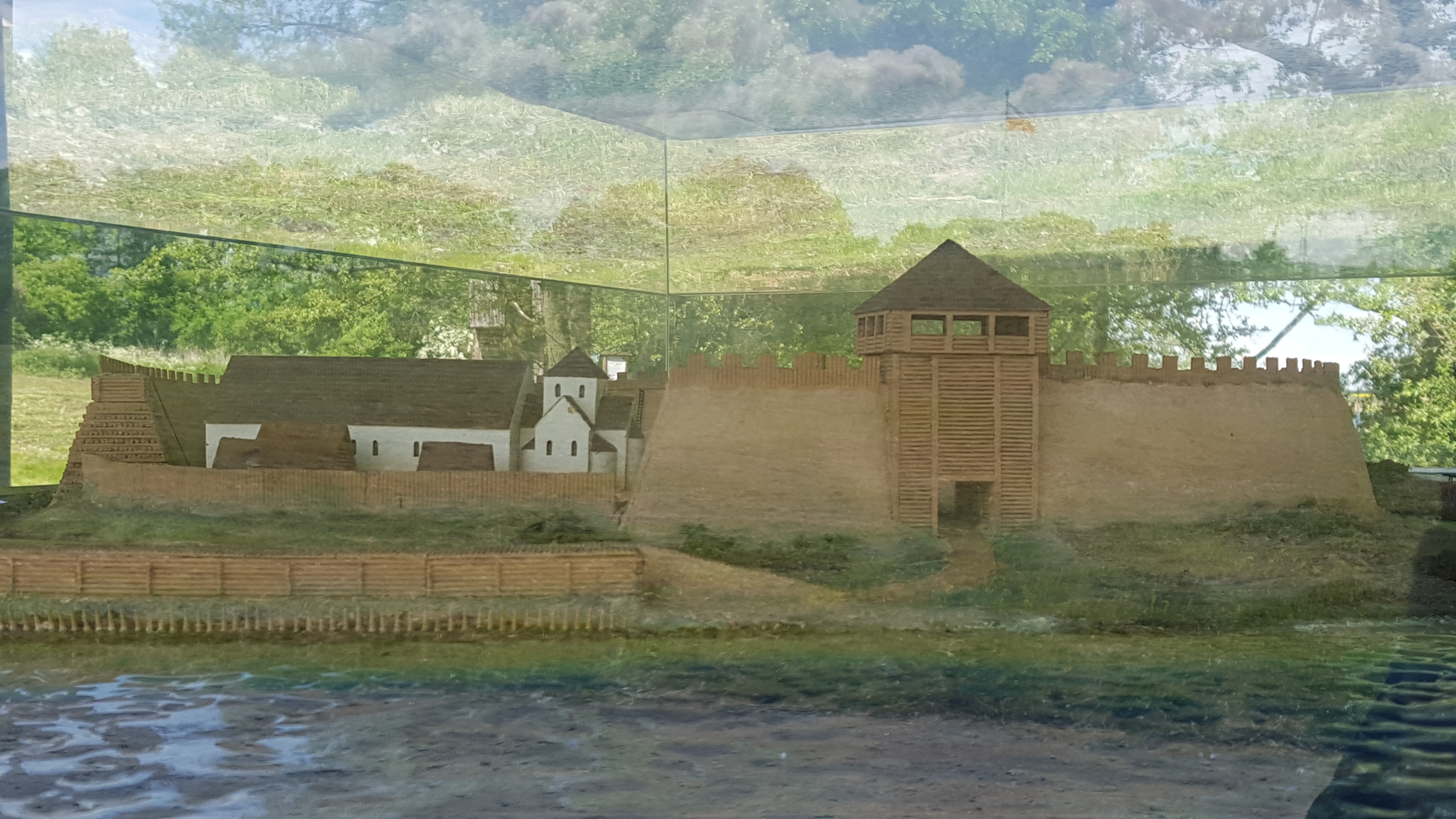
Cross section reconstruction of the medieval gród at Ostrów Lednicki

Ostrów Lednicki is an island in the southern portion of Lake Lednica in Poland, located between the cities of Gniezno and Poznań. The word ostrów is an archaic Polish word for "holm" (i.e., river or lake island) - hence in English it is sometimes known as "Lednica Holm".

A gród (a medieval Slavonic fortified settlement) was built here in the Middle Ages. Existing ruins of a chapel, church and palace, thought to be the home of the first Kings of the Piast dynasty, have been roofed over for preservation. Today the ruins are of archaeological significance, and the site of the Museum of the Piast Dynasty, opened in 1969. It is Poland's largest open-air museum.

The site is one of Poland's official national Historic Monuments (Pomnik historii), as one of the first such monuments designated on September 16, 1994. The list of national monuments is maintained by the National Heritage Board of Poland.

== Significance ==
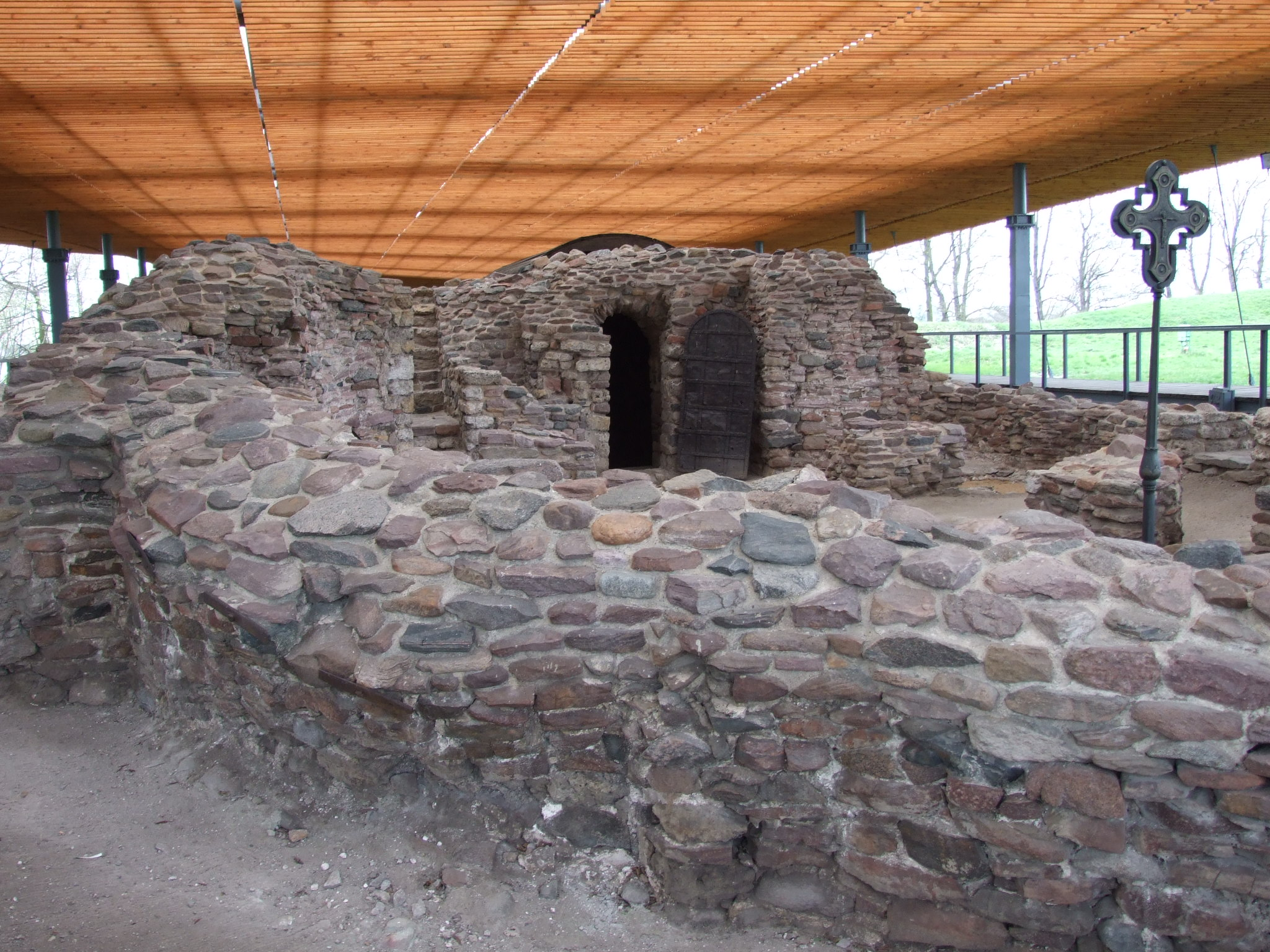
Ruins of the palatium and chapel from the 10th century AD

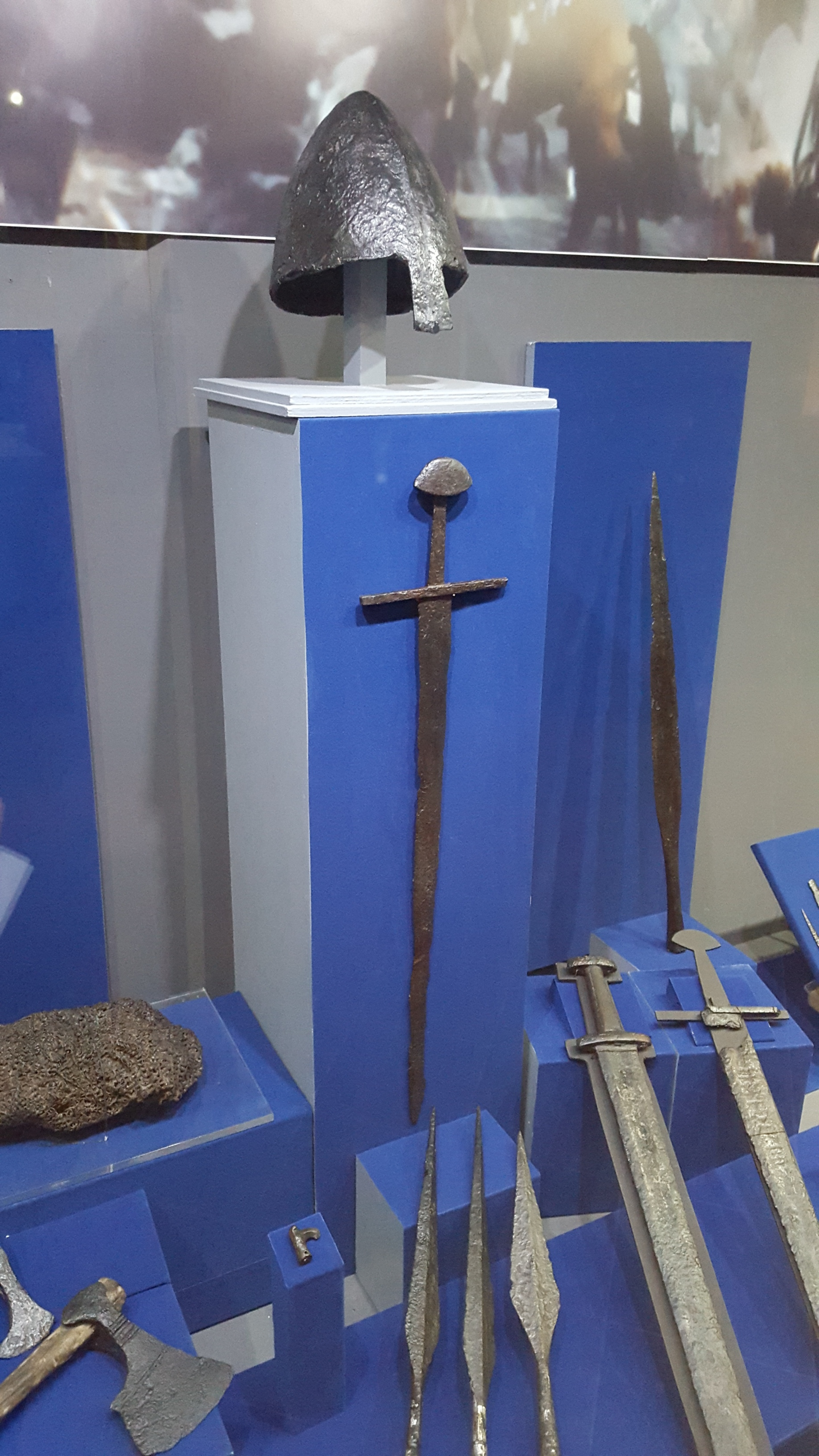
Medieval sword and helmet found at Ostrów Lednicki during excavations

The island is important in the national history of Poland. During the reign of the first ruler of the Polish state, Mieszko I, and Boleslaw the Brave, it stood as one of the main defensive and administrative centers of the kingdom. The ruined castle and other buildings here were constructed during Mieszko I's reign, just before the year 966.

It is also one contender for the historical site of the personal baptism of Mieszko I, his wife Dobrawa of Bohemia, and his court, which took place on the Holy Saturday of April 14, 966. The date is the Baptism of Poland, the historical introduction of Christianity in Poland. The event also marks the beginning of the Polish state.

The island is also the scene of Józef Ignacy Kraszewski's historical 1876 novel An Ancient Tale.

In 2024, a rare wooden sculpture depicting a wooden face was discovered in the ruins of the garrison. Measuring 1.34 meters, with the carving of 13.5x10 cm, it is considered a rare example of Middle Age Slavic pagan art, right during Poland's conversion to Christianity.
