= Christianization of the Slavs =

Aspect of European history

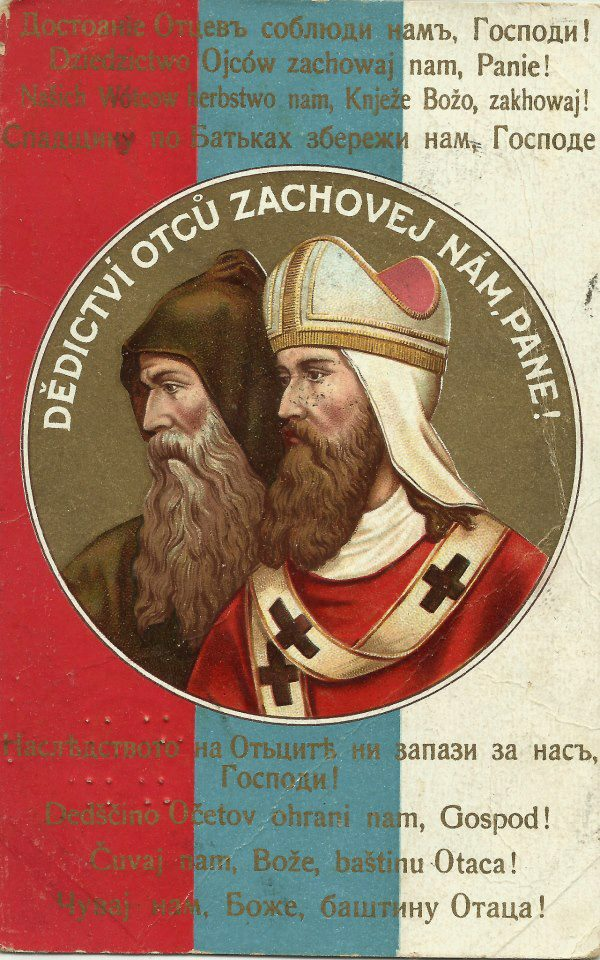
Pan-Slavic postcard depicting Saints Cyril and Methodius, the "Apostles to the Slavs"

The Slavs were Christianized in waves from the 7th to 12th century, though the process of replacing old Slavic religious practices began as early as the 6th century. Generally speaking, the monarchs of the South Slavs adopted Christianity in the 9th century, the East Slavs in the 10th, and the West Slavs between the 9th and 12th century. Saints Cyril and Methodius (fl. 860–885) are attributed as "Apostles to the Slavs", having introduced the Byzantine-Slavic rite (Old Slavonic liturgy) and Glagolitic alphabet, the oldest known Slavic alphabet and basis for the Early Cyrillic alphabet.

The simultaneous missionary efforts to convert the Slavs by what would later become known as the Catholic Church of Rome and the Eastern Orthodox Church of Constantinople led to a 'second point of contention between Rome and Constantinople', especially in Bulgaria (9th–10th century). This was one of many events that preceded the East–West Schism of 1054 and led to the eventual split between the Greek East and Latin West. The Slavs thus became divided between Eastern Orthodoxy and Roman Catholicism. Closely connected to the competing missionary efforts of the Roman Church and the Byzantine Church was the spread of the Latin and Cyrillic scripts in Eastern Europe. The majority of Orthodox Slavs adopted Cyrillic, while most Catholic Slavs adopted the Latin, but there were many exceptions to this general rule. In areas where both Churches were proselytising to pagan Europeans, such as the Grand Duchy of Lithuania, the Croatian Duchy and the Principality of Serbia, mixtures of languages, scripts and alphabets emerged, and the lines between Latin Catholic (Latinitas) and Cyrillic Orthodox literacy (Slavia Orthodoxa) were blurred.

== Examples ==
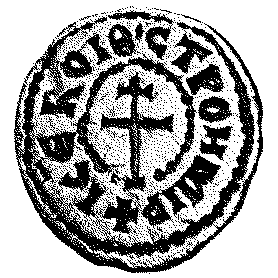
Seal of prince Strojimir of Serbia, from the late 9th century - one of the oldest artifacts on the Christianization of the Slavs

- Christianization of Bulgaria (officially in 864)
- Christianization of Moravia (officially after 863)
- Christianization of Serbia (about 870)
- Christianization of Duchy of Croatia (by the 9th century)
- Christianization of Bohemia (884)
- Christianization of Poland (966)
- Christianization of Kievan Rus' (988)
- Christianization of Pomerania (1124)

== See also ==
- Outline of Slavic history and culture
- Slavic paganism
- Eastern Orthodoxy in Europe
- Catholic Church in Europe
- Christianisation of the Germanic peoples
- Golden Age of medieval Bulgarian culture
- Old Bulgarian
- Early Cyrillic alphabet

== Sources ==
- Berend, Nora, ed. (2007). Christianization and the Rise of Christian Monarchy: Scandinavia, Central Europe and Rus' c. 900–1200. Cambridge and New York: Cambridge University Press. ISBN 9781139468367.
- Betti, Maddalena (2013). The Making of Christian Moravia (858-882): Papal Power and Political Reality. Leiden-Boston: Brill. ISBN 9789004260085.
- Augustine Casiday (2012). The Orthodox Christian World. Routledge. ISBN 978-1-136-31484-1.
- Curta, Florin (2006). Southeastern Europe in the Middle Ages, 500–1250. Cambridge: Cambridge University Press. ISBN 9780521815390.
- Curta, Florin (2019). Eastern Europe in the Middle Ages (500-1300). Leiden and Boston: Brill. ISBN 9789004395190.
- Thomas John Drobena; Wilma Samuella Kucharek (1979). Heritage of the Slavs: The Christianization of the Slavs and the Great Moravian Empire. Kosovo Publishing Company.
- Dvornik, Francis (1962). The Slavs in European History and Civilization. New Brunswick: Rutgers University Press. ISBN 9780813507996.
- Fine, John Van Antwerp Jr. (1991) [1983]. The Early Medieval Balkans: A Critical Survey from the Sixth to the Late Twelfth Century. Ann Arbor, Michigan: University of Michigan Press. ISBN 0472081497.
- B. Gasparov; Olga Raevsky-Hughes (1995). Christianity and the Eastern Slavs: Slavic cultures in the Middle Ages. University of California Press. ISBN 978-0-520-07945-8.
- Komatina, Predrag (2015). "The Church in Serbia at the Time of Cyrilo-Methodian Mission in Moravia". Cyril and Methodius: Byzantium and the World of the Slavs. Thessaloniki: Dimos. pp. 711–718.
- Moravcsik, Gyula, ed. (1967) [1949]. Constantine Porphyrogenitus: De Administrando Imperio (2nd revised ed.). Washington D.C.: Dumbarton Oaks Center for Byzantine Studies. ISBN 9780884020219.
- Špehar, Perica N. (2010). "By Their Fruit you will recognize them - Christianization of Serbia in Middle Ages". Tak więc po owocach poznacie ich. Poznań: Stowarzyszenie naukowe archeologów Polskich. pp. 203–220.
- Špehar, Perica N. (2015). "Remarks to Christianisation and Realms in the Central Balkans in the Light of Archaeological Finds (7th-11th c.)". Castellum, Civitas, Urbs: Centres and Elites in Early Medieval East-Central Europe. Budapest: Verlag Marie Leidorf. pp. 71–93.
- Subotin-Golubović, Tatjana (1999). "Reflection of the Cult of Saint Konstantine and Methodios in Medieval Serbian Culture". Thessaloniki - Magna Moravia: Proceedings of the International Conference. Thessaloniki: Hellenic Association for Slavic Studies. pp. 37–46. ISBN 9789608595934.
- Vlasto, Alexis P. (1970). The Entry of the Slavs into Christendom: An Introduction to the Medieval History of the Slavs. Cambridge: Cambridge University Press. ISBN 9780521074599.
- Živković, Tibor (2007). "The Golden Seal of Stroimir" (PDF). Historical Review. 55. Belgrade: The Institute for History: 23–29. Archived from the original (PDF) on 2018-03-24.
- Živković, Tibor (2008). Forging unity: The South Slavs between East and West 550-1150. Belgrade: The Institute of History, Čigoja štampa. ISBN 9788675585732.
- Živković, Tibor (2012). De conversione Croatorum et Serborum: A Lost Source. Belgrade: The Institute of History.
- Živković, Tibor (2013). "On the Baptism of the Serbs and Croats in the Time of Basil I (867–886)" (PDF). Studia Slavica et Balcanica Petropolitana (1): 33–53.
- Živković, Tibor (2008). Forging unity: The South Slavs between East and West 550-1150. Belgrade: The Institute of History, Čigoja štampa. ISBN 9788675585732.
