= Parish of Blessed Michał Kozal, Gniezno =

Roman Catholic parish in Gniezno, Poland

Parish of Blessed Michał Kozal is one of the Roman Catholic parishes in Gniezno, Poland. It belongs to the Deanery of Gniezno I. Located in the western part of the city, it encompasses part of the Piekary district, the entire Skiereszewo district, and two nearby villages. The main church of the parish is the parish church dedicated to Our Lady of Fatima and Saint John Paul II, situated along with the rectory at 22d Eliza Orzeszkowa Street. The parish was established on 1 January 1988 by Cardinal Józef Glemp. According to data from the 2019/2020 pastoral visitation, it has 5,300 residents. Since 1 July 2012, it has been administered by the Michaelite Fathers from the Congregation of Saint Michael the Archangel.

== History ==
=== Early years ===
The parish was founded in 1988 by a decree from Cardinal Józef Glemp, with Father Alfred Lewicz as its first parson. Due to the lack of a rectory, a temporary wooden barrack was erected near the church, serving as a provisional rectory with three apartments, a kitchen, a guest room, and a catechetical room. In 1990, the first parish group, the Mothers' Living Rosary Circle, was formed, followed in 1991 by the Liturgical Service. The Confraternity of the Scapular was also established, still active today at the Carmelite Sisters' monastery. After the 1992 reorganization of the Polish Catholic Church, the parish was assigned to the Deanery of Gniezno I. Land was owned for constructing a church and rectory, and a model and plans were commissioned by the parson, though the Metropolitan Curia rejected the project twice.

=== 2004–2009 ===
Vicars changed over the years: Father Witold Ceglarek was succeeded by Father Błażej Czarnecki after Ceglarek's tragic death on 7 December 2005, which drew a large funeral attendance. In 2007, priests moved into the new rectory's completed residential section. That year, Father Jakub Dębiec, a doctor of pastoral theology and liturgy, replaced Father Czarnecki as vicar. He reorganized the Liturgical Service and started a sports field project near the rectory. Soon after, he became the Diocesan Chaplain of the Liturgical Service, then Archbishop Henryk Muszyński's master of ceremonies and prefect of the Primatial Major Seminary in Gniezno, prompting his departure. Father Krzysztof Walkowski, recently returned from specialized studies in Rome, became vicar and founded the Allegria Youth Community in 2008, replacing the former Youth Ministry. Months later, some members formed the Allegria Music Ensemble. Walkowski introduced female lectors to the liturgical service. In late 2008, the parish acquired a cemetery at the Dalkoska and Kostrzewski streets intersection (now Aleksander Piotrowski Street). By late 2009, with efforts from youth and parishioners, the rectory's next section – the Studnia Youth Formation Center – was completed. After Father Karmoliński's departure, Father Piotr Szymkowiak arrived, founding the Małe Radości children's choir and preparing for the VI Archdiocesan Parish Games of Gniezno. He established a Sports Commission to oversee preparations, resumed sports field work, and launched the parish newsletter Z życia Parafii bł. Michała Kozala… on 22 November 2009 as a weekly supplement to Przewodnik Katolicki.

=== 2010–2012 ===
Preparations for the VI Parish Games, held 2–3 May 2010 in Inowrocław, began early that year. The parish initially placed third but was later awarded second place after a scoring revision. On 16 June, Father Walkowski became parish administrator due to the parson's health issues. On 24 June 2010, Dean Father Andrzej Grzelak blessed and opened the Kozalik Sports Field, the Studnia Youth Formation Center, and the new Kozal Gniezno Parish Sports Club. Late June saw work begin on the parish center's unfinished large hall, intended as a temporary chapel, and the cemetery. On 4 September, the former parson was reassigned as a resident to Saint Hedwig Queen Parish in Inowrocław, with parishioners thanking him on 12 September. The Christmas Eve Midnight Mass on 24 December 2010 was celebrated in the new chapel at the parish center. At the VII Archdiocesan Parish Games of Gniezno on 2–3 May 2011, the parish won first place, defeating six-time champions Saint Nicholas Parish of Sławno, earning the Archbishop's Cup and a golden chasuble. In July 2011, the old barrack, unused since 2009, was demolished. By September, the parish center's parking, garage access, and landscaping were completed. On 7 February 2012, a chimney failure closed the church, transferring all Masses to the chapel. Father Jessa celebrated his 25th ordination anniversary on 30 May 2012 and was relieved of duties on 5 June, with a farewell on 17 June. On 24 June, Archbishop Józef Kowalczyk urged the parish to fulfill Glemp's decree to build a church dedicated to Blessed Michał Kozal. On 25 June, he and the Michaelite superior agreed to entrust the parish to the Michaelites effective 1 July, replacing all prior clergy with four Michaelite priests. In September, parking work concluded. On 20 December, the parish gained ownership of the church on Poznańska Street, previously state-owned and its main temple from 1988 to 2010.

=== 2013–2018 ===
In 2013, a new parish church design was finalized by June. On 13 July, Father Kazimierz Radzik, Michaelite Superior General, blessed the construction site. In mid-July, the parish received Ministry of Culture and National Heritage funding for the filial church's renovation, starting 14 October. The Children of God Oasis began in September, while the Allegria Youth Community ceased. In March 2014, new church construction started, with foundations completed by summer. The parish center's chapel and residential exterior were finished. On 31 May, the parish won first place at the X Archdiocesan Parish Games. Filial church renovations paused from March to July due to funding issues, resuming in October after new heating was installed. By year-end, the roof was fully renovated. 19th-century wall paintings were discovered, prompting conservation plans for 2015 due to insufficient parish funds. New church construction resumed in March 2015, reaching raw completion in 2017. On 21 May 2017, Archbishop Józef Kowalczyk laid the cornerstone. On 27 April 2018, the Blessed Sacrament moved to the new church, desecrating the parish center chapel. On 17 June, Archbishop Wojciech Polak, Primate of Poland, consecrated it as the Church of Our Lady of Fatima and Saint John Paul II.

== Parish scope ==
The parish covers parts of Piekary (streets between Piekary, Czarniecki, and Poznańska), the Dziekanka hospital area, Dziekanka and Skiereszewo districts, Strumykowa Street, and the villages of Skiereszewo and Braciszewo. It includes four schools: Saint Wojciech Primary School No. 3, Parents-Children Association Gymnasium, Bolesław Chrobry I High School, and the Institute of European Culture.

== Religious house ==
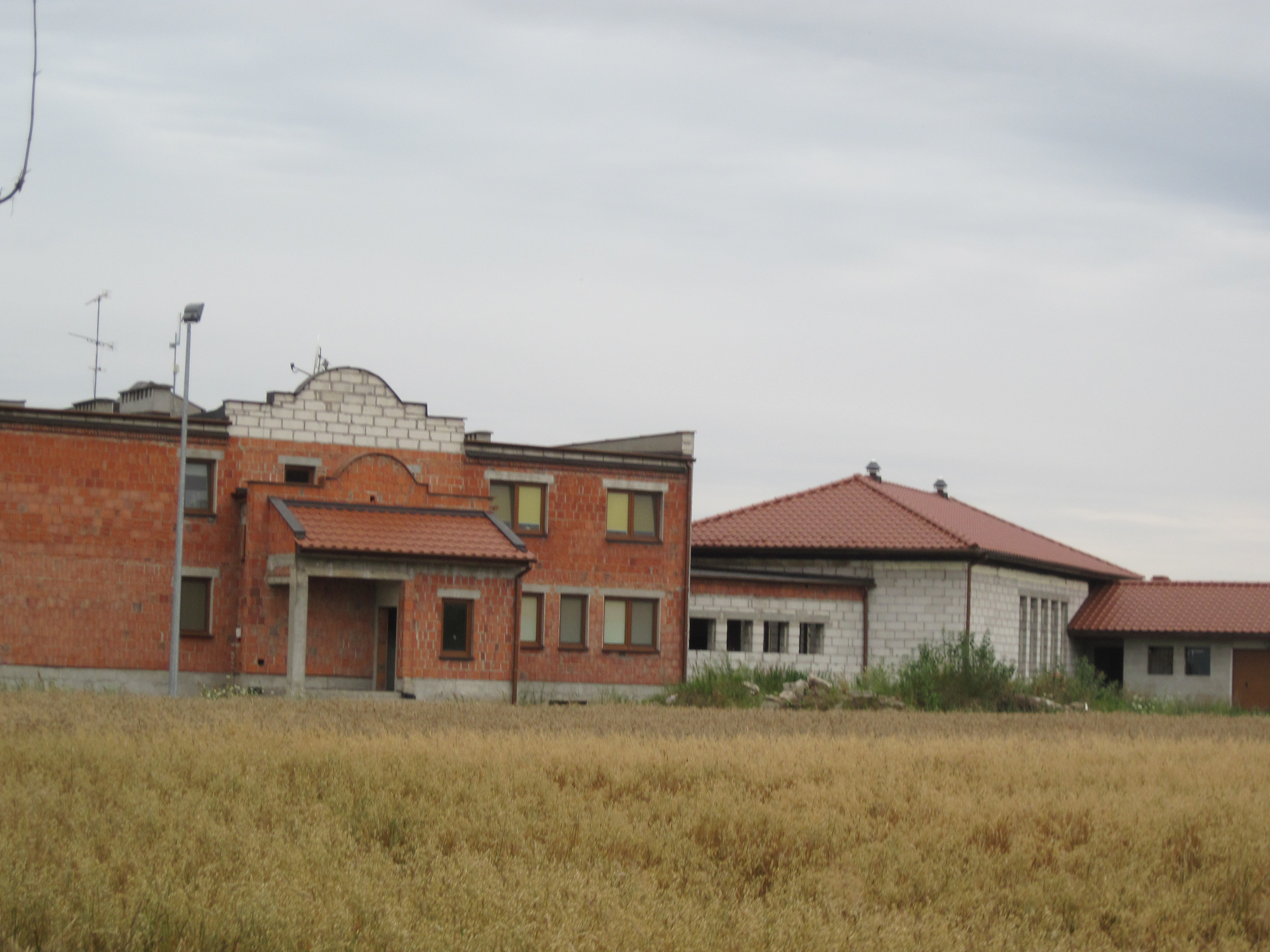
Parish center

Built from 2001 to 2017 at 22d Eliza Orzeszkowa Street, it includes a residential section (rectory), the Well Youth Formation Center, a hall named after Blessed Bronisław Markiewicz, and garages. From 2010 to 2017, the hall served as a temporary chapel. The Kozalik sports field operated there from 2010 to 2015. Garage access and landscaping were completed in 2011. After the Michaelites took over, the rectory became their property, while the parish retained the rest. A religious house was established on 1 November 2012, including a chapel dedicated to Saint Dominic. Exterior work finished in August 2014, with construction completed in 2017.

=== Well Youth Formation Center ===
Opened in late 2009 within the parish center, originally planned as a preschool. After the Allegria Youth Community formed in 2008, it became a youth meeting space with an oratory, a small meeting room, a storage area, and restrooms. It has since been repurposed: the meeting room is now a parish office, and the oratory hosts language classes and group meetings.

== Parish communities and groups ==
Since its founding, the parish has hosted numerous groups, with a peak between 2008 and 2010 when five were established. Current groups include:

- Liturgical Service: Includes altar servers, lectors (male and female), and ceremonial assistants, with its own banner and social media page.
- Małe Radości Children's Choir: Founded in late 2009, it comprises singing children and older guitarists, placing third at the VI and X Archdiocesan Parish Games.
- Living Rosary Community: One of the earliest groups, with two women's circles, two family circles, and a missionary circle, owning a banner.
- Caritas Group: Volunteers aiding the parish's poor and needy.
- Saint Michael the Archangel Parish Choir: Formed in 2018 for the church consecration by Father Maksymilian Wójtowicz.
- Źródło Jakuba Renewal in the Holy Spirit: Established in 1996, it co-organized parish Faith Renewal Retreats in 2013.
- Domestic Church: A family branch of the Light-Life Movement with three circles.
- Children of God Oasis: A children's Light-Life branch since 2013, joining diocesan retreats.
- Youth Oasis: A youth Light-Life branch since 2014.
- Kozal Gniezno Parish Sports Club: Founded in June 2010 after the VI Parish Games' second place, with a statute and board, hosting annual table tennis and indoor football tournaments.

Former groups include Youth Ministry (2000–2004), Allegria Youth Community (2008–2012), Allegria Music Ensemble (2008–2014), Piąta Pieczęć band (2004–2014), Family Community (2009–2012), and Holy Family Confraternity (2010–2016).

== Carmelite Sisters' Monastery ==
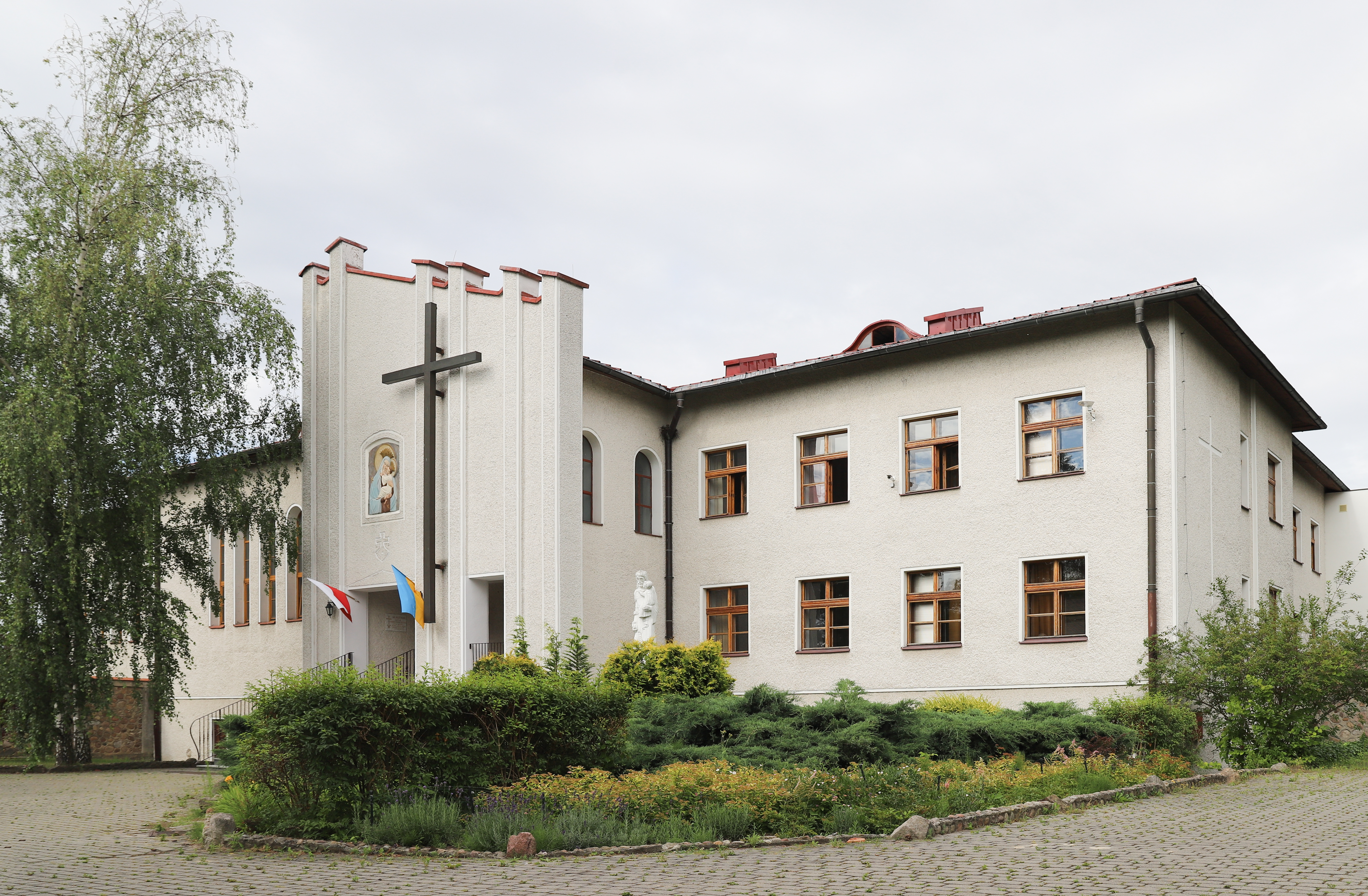
Discalced Carmelite Monastery in Gniezno

Located on Cienista Street, the monastery includes the Holy Family Chapel, hosting daily Masses. Founded by nine sisters from Tryszczyn near Bydgoszcz at Cardinal Glemp's request, it opened on 30 June 1995. The sisters maintain a garden and embroider liturgical vestments and banners for income.

== Cemetery ==
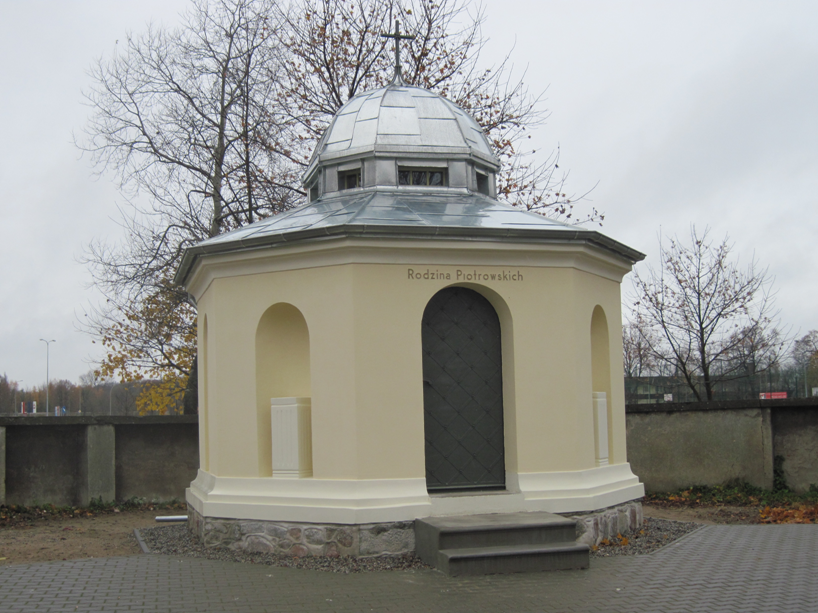
Piotrowski Family Tomb

Situated on Dalkoska Street, the cemetery dates to 1894 with the Dziekanka hospital, divided into Catholic and Lutheran sections. It buried hospital patients until 1939 and Lutherans until 1945. During Nazi occupation, it stored murdered patients' bodies, with 90% of graves destroyed in 1940. Used for patients until the 1970s, it was municipalized, then transferred to the Metropolitan Curia in the 1990s. The parish managed it from 2008, conducting five burials by 2010. Of about 100 graves, many from between 1910 and 1920 are damaged or anonymous. The Piotrowski family tomb, including Aleksander Piotrowski, the first Polish hospital director, was restored in November 2010. On 15 July 2011, it returned to Curia management.

== External activities ==
The parish competed in the Archdiocesan Parish Games in Inowrocław four times: second in 2010, first in 2011, fourth in 2013, and first in 2014. It joins sports tournaments, the Saint Wojciech feast procession since 2008, and youth events like the Pilgrimage to Saint Wojciech's Tomb, Lednica 2000, and Taizé ESM.
