= Christianization of Bohemia =

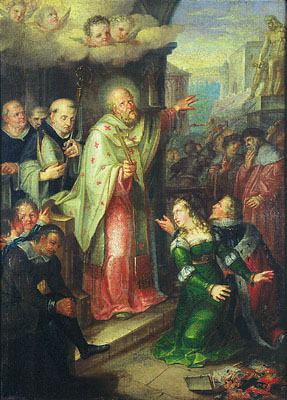
The Baptism of Duke Bořivoj, a historical painting by Václav Ignác Leopold Markovský

The Christianization of Bohemia refers to the spread of the Christian religion in the lands of medieval Bohemia. As in many other countries, Christianity was related to the establishment of a new state (first the Duchy of Bohemia, later the Kingdom of Bohemia), and was implemented from the top down.

According to the Annales Fuldenses 14 Bohemian dukes were christianized in Regensburg in 845. The process continued with the conversion of Bořivoj I, Duke of Bohemia, the founder of the Přemyslid dynasty, in 884. It was an outgrowth of the Christianization of Moravia, traditionally attributed to the Byzantine missionaries, Saints Cyril and Methodius, in 863. At first, the Christian rite in Bohemia was the Slavic one of the Eastern Orthodox Church, but it was soon replaced by the Roman Catholic rite, introduced due to Western influences, and also tensions between the Bohemians and the Moravians. In 895, Prague became part of the Bavarian Roman Catholic Diocese of Regensburg. In 973 a bishopric was established in Prague.

By the 10th century, several native saints emerged in Bohemia: Saint Ludmila of Bohemia (wife of Bořivoj I), their grandson Saint Wenceslas and Saint Adalbert, Bishop of Prague. Saint Wenceslas is said to have completed the Christianization of Bohemia in the early 10th century, shortly before his assassination in 935 by his own brother, Boleslav the Cruel. Boleslav's daughter, Dobrawa of Bohemia, married Mieszko I of Poland, and became instrumental in converting him, his court, and Poland itself to the Christian religion.

By the early 11th century, Bohemia gained an upper hand over Moravia, which was annexed to Bohemia. Moravians were allowed to practice their Slavic Eastern Orthodox rites, but eventually they were replaced by Franco-Latin Catholic practices. A parish network was created around the 13th century.

== See also ==
- Jan Hus and the Hussites
- Religion in the Czech Republic

== Literature ==
- Žemlička, Josef (2014). "The Christianization and State Formation Process in Central Europe". The Cyril and Methodius Mission and Europe: 1150 Years Since the Arrival of the Thessaloniki Brothers in Great Moravia. pp. 22–27. ISBN 978-80-86023-51-9. OS LG 2023-08-18.
