= Lednica 2000 =

Coordinates: 52°33′08″N 17°22′27″E

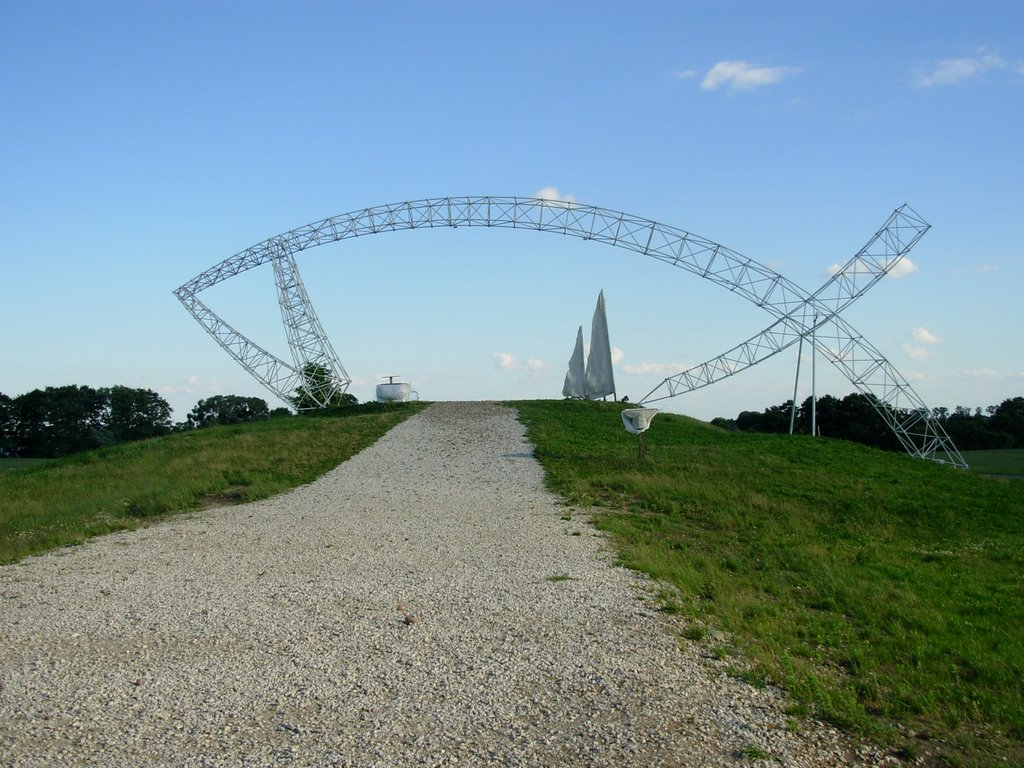
Ichthys of Lednica (the Symbol of Christ and the gate)

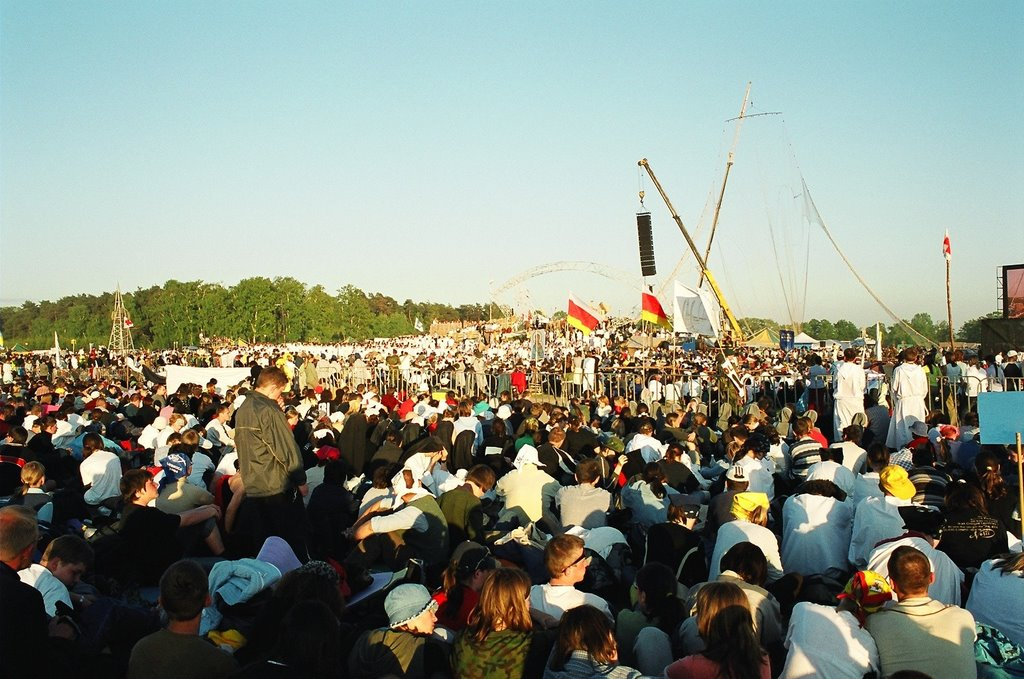
8th Poland-wide Youth Meeting in Lednica in 2004

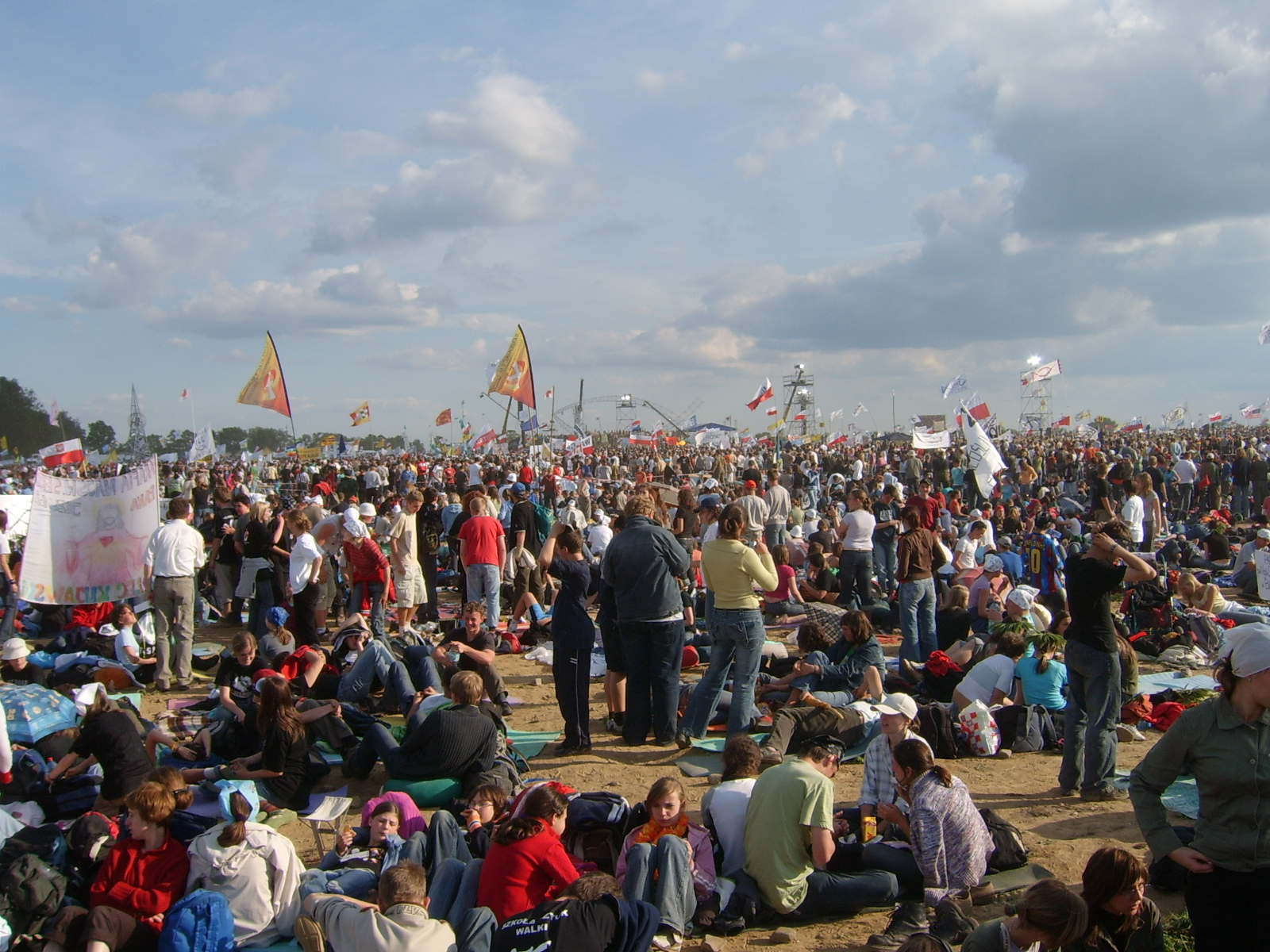
10th Poland-wide Youth Meeting in Lednica in 2006 (the Lednica fish in background)

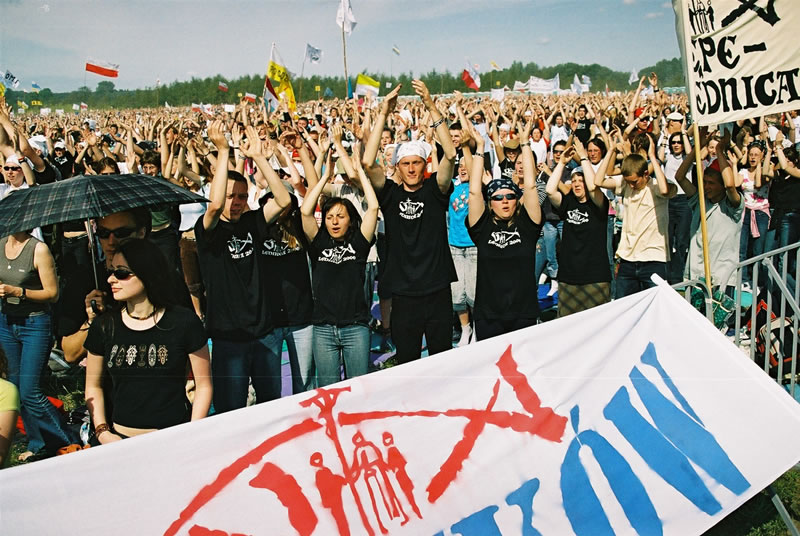
Young people enjoying the event and praying at the same time in one of the "Lednica dances" during the gathering on 3 June 2006

The Poland-wide Youth Meeting Lednica 2000 (known as Lednica) is an annual gathering of Polish Catholic youth, organized near Gniezno in Pola Lednickie (near the Lednica lake, which is believed to be the place where the first Polish monarch, Mieszko I was baptized in 966). It is the largest regular religious youth meeting in the world (with exception of those attended by the Pope).

Lednica gatherings were initiated in 1997 by the Poznań-based Dominican friar Jan Góra. Since then, they are organized every year and always take place on the first Saturday of June.

Pope John Paul II sent an annual special message to participants of Lednica. This tradition was continued by his successor, Benedict XVI. After his papal resignation, the tradition is continued by pope Francis.

== The meetings ==
- 2 June 1997, (20 000 participants) – We have to go
- 30 May 1998, (50 000 participants) – Never alone
- 4 June 1999, (60 000 participants) – To see the reason
- 10 June 2000, (70 000 participants) – Choose Christ!
- 2 June 2001, (90 000 participants) – Duc in altum!
- 18 May 2002, (100 000 participants) – Wedding in Cana of Galilee
- 7 June 2003, (140 000 participants) – The talent liturgy
- 29 May 2004, (180 000 participants) – Let us be caught in the net of love!
- 4 June 2005, (150 000 participants) – Let us meet by the Source
- 3 June 2006, (70 000 participants) – Christ is the way
- 2 June 2007, (45 000 participants) – Send me, with the presence of Cardenal Stanisław Dziwisz
- 7 June 2008, (70 000 participants) – I called you friends!, with the presence of Archbishop Kazimierz Nycz
- 6 June 2009, (97 000 participants) – Recognize a time!
- 5 June 2010, (80 000 participants) – The Gift and Mystery of Womanhood
- 4 June 2011, (80 000 participants) – JP2 - Sanctity is what counts
- 2 June 2012, (60 000 participants) – Love will find You!
- 1 June 2013, (80 000 participants) – In the name of the Father
- 7 June 2014, (60 000 participants) – In the name of the Son
- 6 June 2015, (75 000 participants) – In the name of the Holy Spirit
- 4 June 2016, (85 000 participants) – Amen
- 3 June 2017, (90 000 participants) – Go and love!
- 2 June 2018, (100 000 participants) – I am
- 1 June 2019, (60 000 participants) – You know that I love you
- 6 June 2020, (130 000 online participants) - All Yours #LednicaAtHome
- 5 June 2021, () - Hear
- 4 June 2022, (20 000 participants) - To the edge of the world
- 3 June 2023, (20 000 participants) - Follow the Lamb
