= Lednica Landscape Park =

Protected area in Poland

Coordinates: 52°31′N 17°22′E

- Lednicki Park Krajobrazowy
- IUCN category V (protected landscape/seascape)
- Interactive map of Lednica Landscape Park
- Location: Greater Poland Voivodeship

Lednica Landscape Park (Lednicki Park Krajobrazowy) is a protected area (Landscape Park) in west-central Poland.

The Park lies within Greater Poland Voivodeship, north of Gniezno, in the region of Lednica lake, the site of annual Roman Catholic religious youth gatherings.

The landscape of the park, shaped by the last glaciation, consists of ground moraine plains with hills of terminal moraine and long glacial gutters filled with lakes, covering about 7% of the protected area. Less than 10% of the park consists of forests, mainly pine forests with an admixture of spruce and deciduous species.
