= Pola Lednickie =

Coordinates: 52°33′10″N 17°22′20″E

- Village
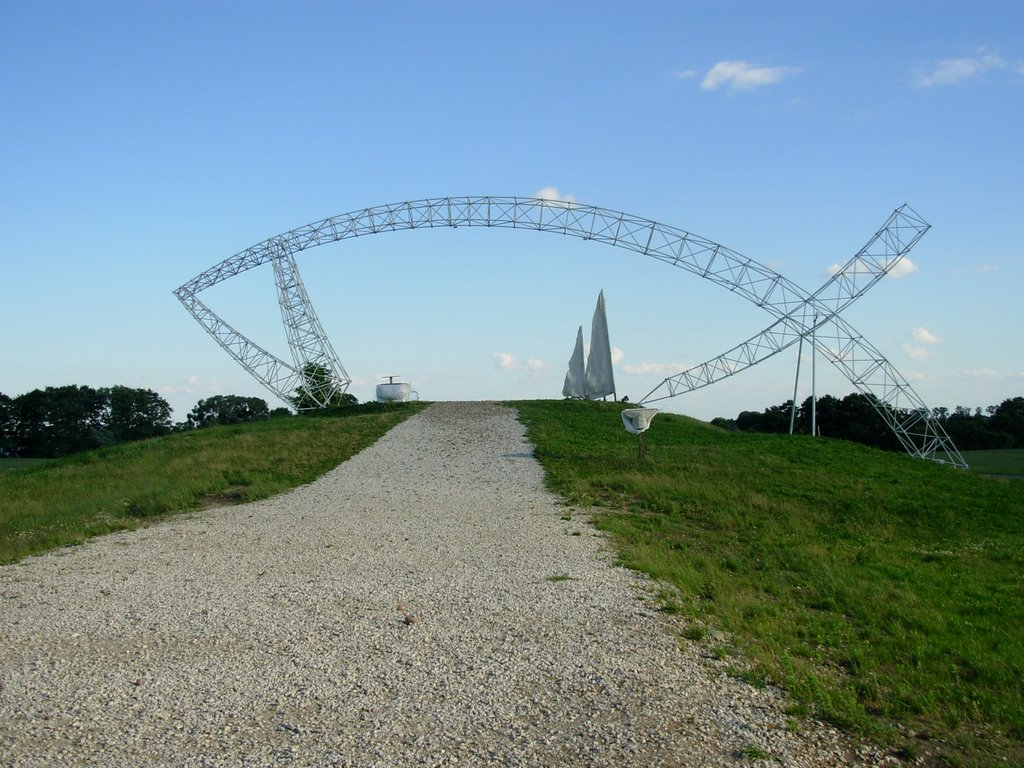
- Interactive map of Pola Lednickie
- Country: Poland
- Voivodeship: Greater Poland
- County: Gniezno
- Gmina: Kiszkowo

Pola Lednickie [pavlaˈlɛdnɛɛtskɨa] is a small village in the administrative district of Gmina Kiszkowo, within Gniezno County, Greater Poland Voivodeship, in west-central Poland. It separated from the village of Imiolki on January 1, 2013, to become its own village.
