= Lednica (lake) =

Lake and protected area in Poland

- Location within Greater Poland Voivodeship
- Location: Greater Poland Voivodeship
- Coordinates: 52°33′N 17°22′E
- Basin countries: Poland
- Surface area: 3.48 km^{2} (1.34 sq mi)
- Surface elevation: 110 m (360 ft)

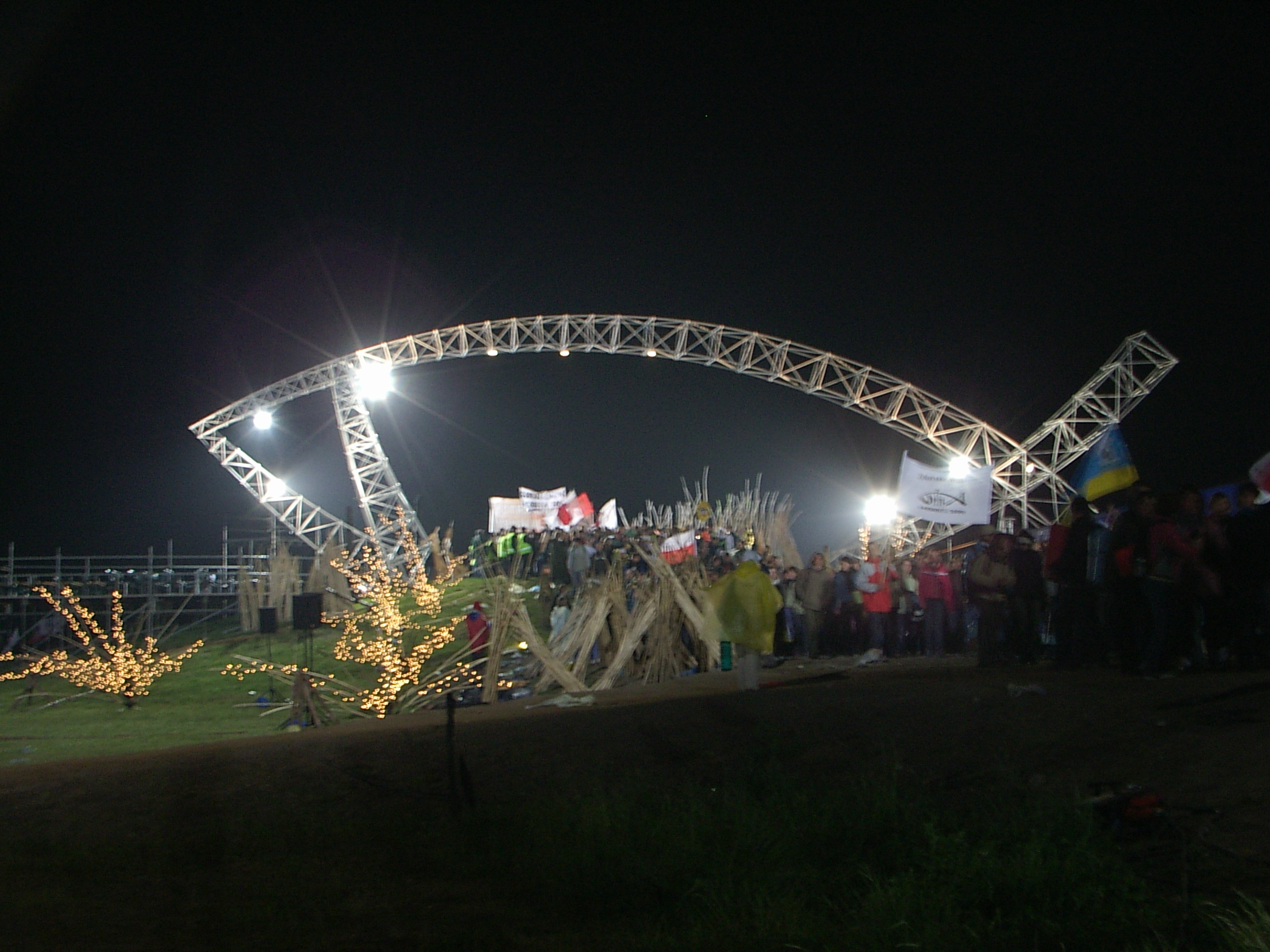
Symbolic fish shaped gate

Lednica is a lake and surrounding protected landscape area located between Poznań and Gniezno in west-central Poland, within the Greater Poland Voivodeship. It is known for annual youth meetings that take place in early June. These religious events last for two days. The high point of the festival is a nocturnal walk under a massive steel fish structure - a symbol of Christianity.

The place is regarded as a possible site of the Baptism of Poland, where the first historical ruler of Poland Mieszko I accepted Christianity in 966. An island on the lake called Ostrów Lednicki contains remains of residential and sacral stone architecture from the 10th and 11th century. The results of underwater acoustic and archaeological surveys have confirmed the presence of several medieval bridges connecting the island of Ostrów Lednicki and suggest the presence of such bridges connecting the Ledniczka island with the mainland.
