= Christianization of Poland =

Conversion of country to Christianity

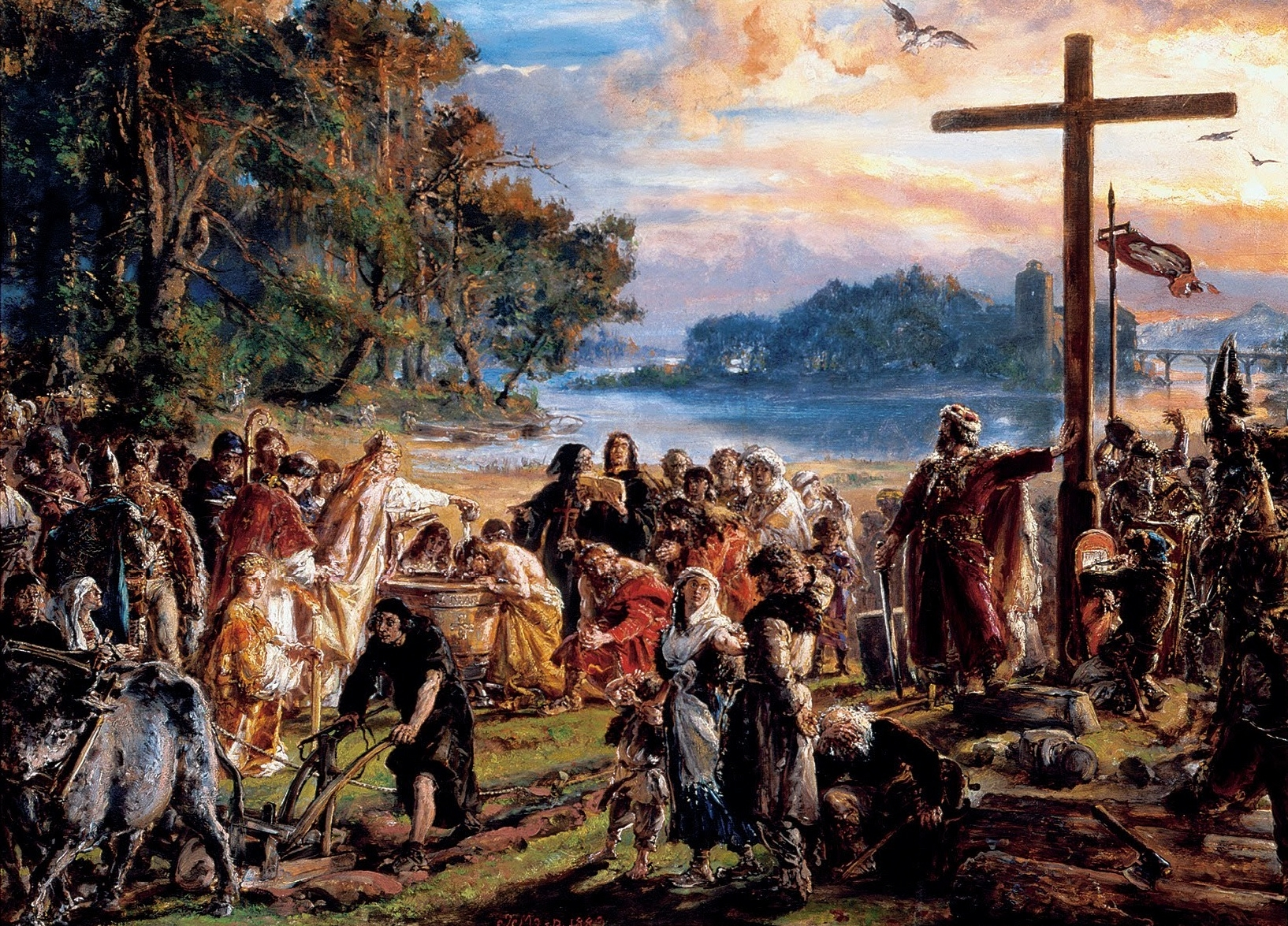
Christianization of Poland A.D. 966. by Jan Matejko

The Christianization of Poland (Polish: chrystianizacja Polski [xrɘs.tja.ɲiˈza.t͡sja ˈpɔl.ski]) refers to the introduction and subsequent spread of Christianity in Poland. The impetus to the process was the Baptism of Poland (Polish: chrzest Polski [ˈxʂɛst ˈpɔl.ski]), the personal baptism of Mieszko I, the first ruler of the future Polish state, and much of his court. The ceremony took place on Holy Saturday, 14 April 966 (under the Julian pre-Gregorian calendar, equivalent to 19 April 966 Gregorian), although the exact location is disputed by historians, with the cities of Poznań and Gniezno being the most likely sites. Mieszko's wife, Dobrawa of Bohemia, is often seen as a major influence on Mieszko's decision to accept Christianity.

While the spread of Christianity in Poland took centuries to finish, the process was ultimately successful, as within several decades Poland joined the rank of established Christian polities recognised by the papacy and the Holy Roman Empire. According to much historiography, the baptism of Poland marks the beginning of Polish statehood. Nevertheless, the Christianization was a long and arduous process, as most of the Polish population remained pagan until the pagan reaction during the 1030s.

== Background ==
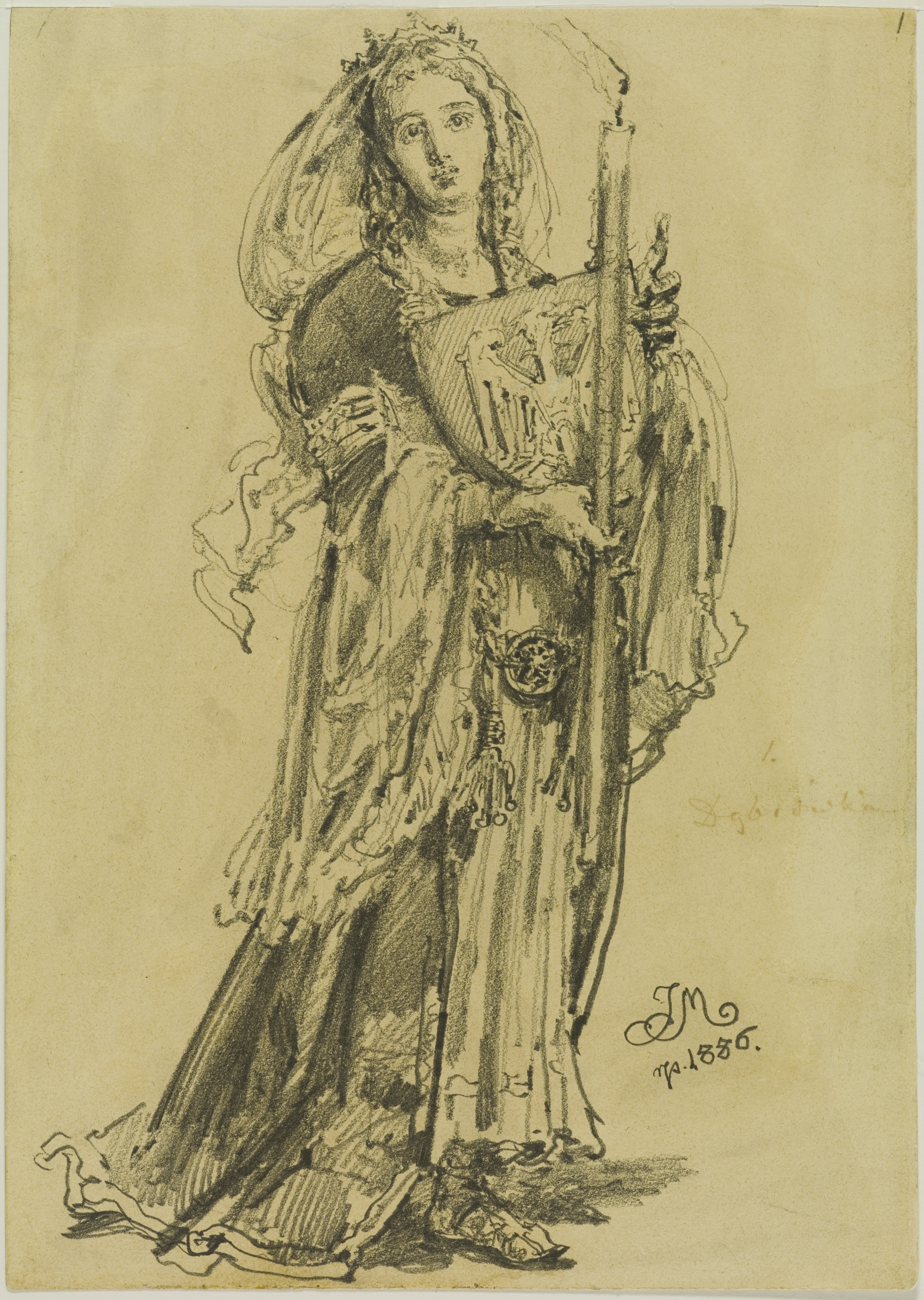
Dobrawa, Mieszko's wife who played a major role in Poland's conversion to Christianity

Before the adoption of Christianity in modern-day Poland, there were a number of different pagan tribes. Svetovid was among the most widespread pagan gods worshiped in Poland. Christianity arrived around the late 9th century, most likely around the time when the Vistulan tribe encountered the Christian rite in dealings with their neighbors, the Great Moravia (Bohemian) state.

The Moravian cultural influence played a significant role in the spread of Christianity onto the Polish lands and the subsequent adoption of that religion. In the opinion of Davies, the Christianization of Poland through the Czech–Polish alliance represented a conscious choice on the part of Polish rulers to ally themselves with the Czech state rather than the German one. In a similar fashion, some of the later political struggles involved the Polish Church refusing to subordinate itself to the German hierarchy and instead being directly subordinate to the Vatican.

=== Baptism ===
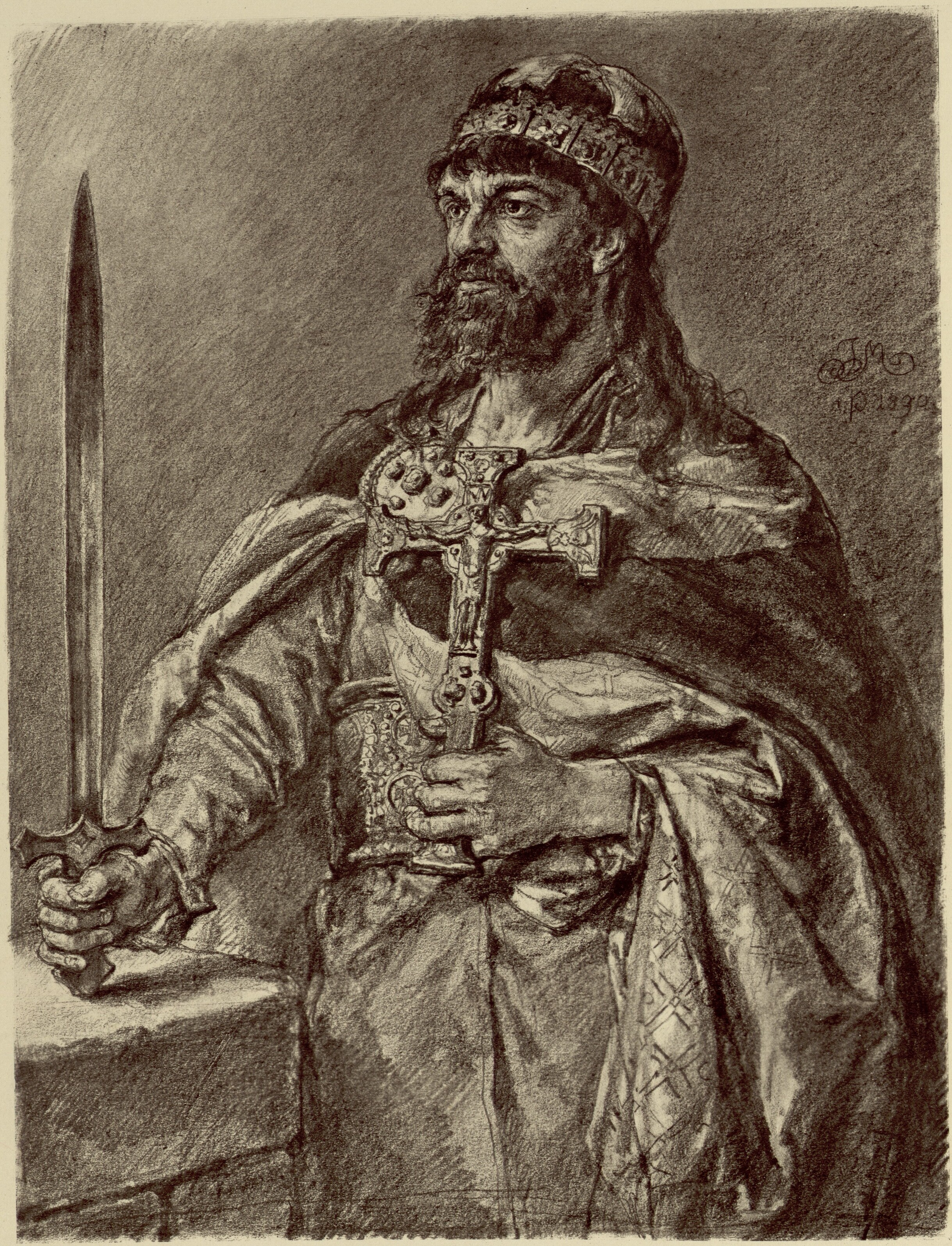
Mieszko I, the first Christian ruler of Poland. Depicted by Jan Matejko as holding a crucifix in an allusion to the Baptism of Poland.

"The Baptism of Poland" refers to the ceremony when the first ruler of the Polish state, Mieszko I, and much of his court converted to Christianity. Mieszko's wife Dobrawa of Bohemia, a zealous Christian, played a significant role in promoting Christianity in Poland, and might have had a significant influence on converting Mieszko himself.

The exact place of Mieszko's baptism is disputed; Most historians argue that Gniezno or Poznań are the most likely sites. However, other historians have suggested alternative locations, such as Ostrów Lednicki, or even in German Regensburg. The date of Mieszko's baptism was 14 April 966, Holy Saturday.

The ceremony was preceded by a week of oral catechism and several days of fasting. The actual ceremony involved pouring water over the segregated groups of men and women, although it is possible that their heads were immersed instead, and anointed with the chrism.

=== Christianization of Poland ===
The baptismal mission which began in the two major cities of Gniezno and Poznań with the baptism of Mieszko and his court spread throughout the country. During the 10th and 11th centuries various ecclesiastical organs were established in Poland. This included the building of churches and the appointment of clergy. The first Bishop of Poland, Jordan, was appointed by Pope John XIII in 968. Mieszko's son Bolesław I the Brave supported Christianization missions to neighboring lands, notably the mission of future Saint Adalbert of Prague to Old Prussians, and established the Archbishopric of Gniezno in the year 1000.

At first, the Christian religion was "unpopular and alien": Mieszko's baptism was highly influential, but Christianization still had to be enforced by the state. This policy ran into popular opposition, up to and including spates of violent uprisings in the 1030s. Nonetheless, by that time Poland had won recognition as a proper European state, from both the papacy and the Holy Roman Empire.

Out of various provinces of today's Poland, Christianity's spread was slowest in Pomerania, where it gained a significant following only around the 12th century. Initially, the clergy came from the Western Christian European countries; native Polish clergy took three or four generations to emerge, and were supported by the monasteries and friars that grew increasingly common in the 12th century. By the 13th century Roman Catholicism had become the dominant religion throughout Poland.

In adopting Christianity as the state religion, Mieszko sought to achieve several personal goals. He saw Poland's baptism as a way of strengthening his hold on power, as well as using it as a unifying force for the Polish people. It replaced several smaller cults with a single, central one, clearly associated with the royal court. It would also improve the position and respectability of the Polish state on the international, European scene. The Church also helped to strengthen the monarch's authority and brought to Poland much experience with regard to state administration. Thus, the Church organisation supported the state, and in return, bishops received important government titles (in the later era, they were members of the Senate of Poland).

== Millennial celebrations of 1966 ==
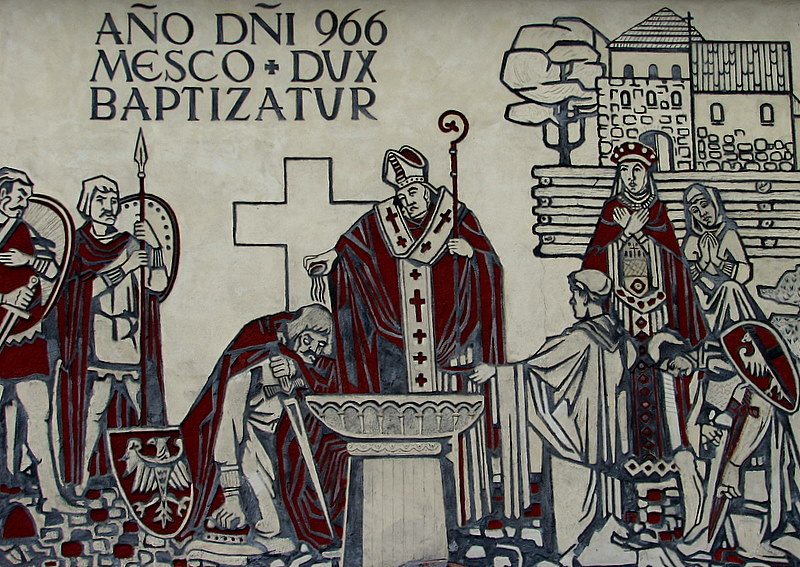
Contemporary mural in Gniezno commemorating the baptism of Poland

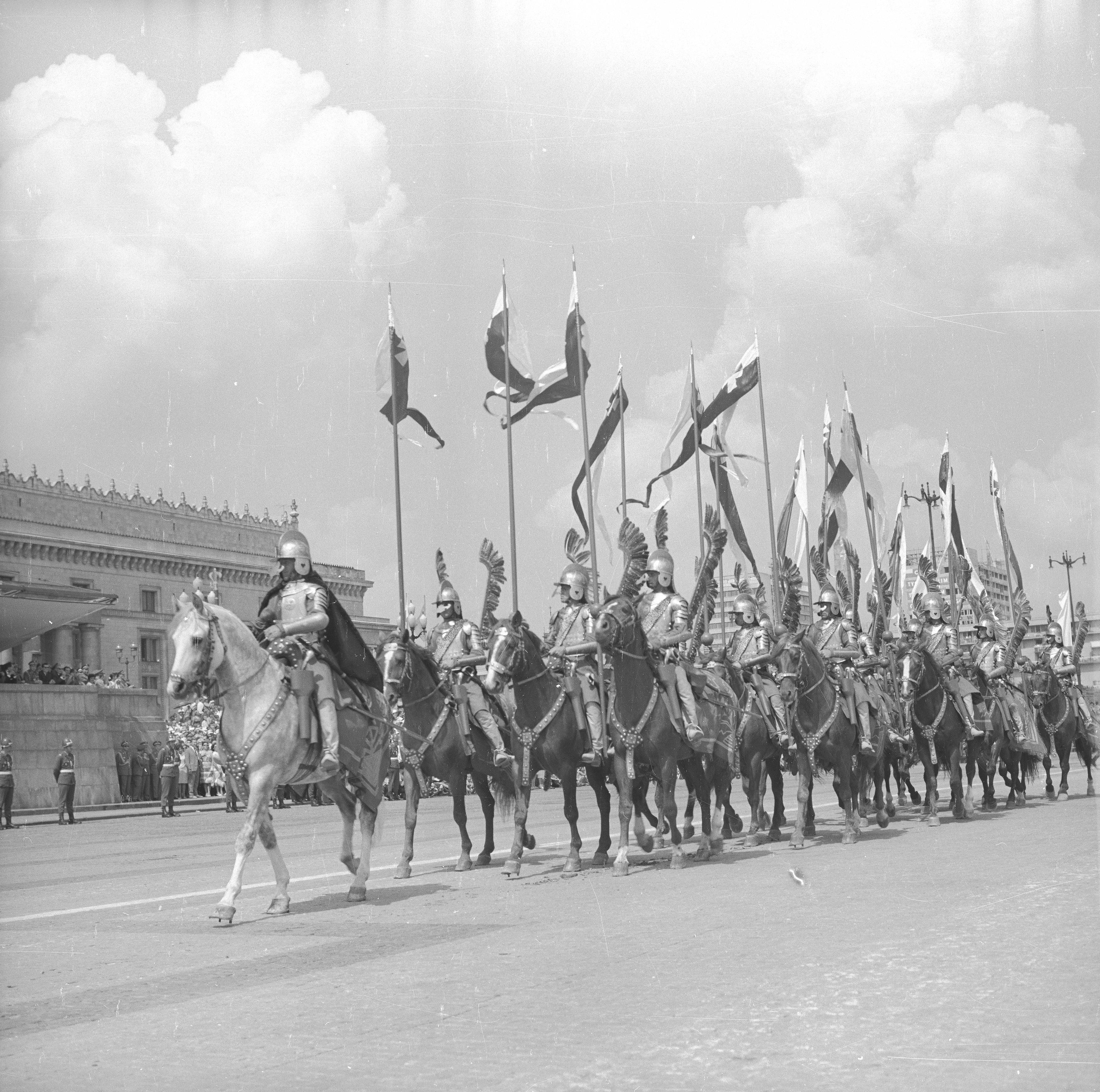
Ceremonial cavalry during the parade in 1966

The preparations for the millennial celebrations begun with the Great Novena of 1957, which marked a nine years period of fast and prayer. In 1966, the People's Republic of Poland witnessed large festivities on the 1,000th anniversary of those events, with the Church celebrating the 1,000 years of Christianity in Poland, while the Communist government celebrated the secular 1,000 years of the Polish State, culminated in twice denying Pope Paul VI permission to visit Poland that year. The desire of the Communist party to separate religion from the state made the festivities a culture clash between the state and the Church. While the Church was focusing on the religious, ecclesiastical aspects of the baptism, with slogans (in Latin) like Sacrum Poloniae Millenium (Poland's Sacred Millennium), the Communist Party was framing the celebrations as a secular, political anniversary of the creation of the Polish state, with slogans (in Polish) like Tysiąclecie Państwa Polskiego (A Thousand Years of the Polish State). As Norman Davies noted, both the Church and the Party had "rival, and mutually exclusive, interpretations of [Poland's baptism] significance".

On 30 July 1966, the U.S. Bureau of Engraving and Printing issued 128,475,000 commemorative stamps honoring the millennium anniversary of the adoption of Christianity in Poland.

An anniversary parade was held in front of the Palace of Culture and Science on Parade Square on 22 July to coincide with the annual National Day of the Rebirth of Poland celebrations (set on the anniversary of the signing of the PKWN Manifesto). It was attended by Władysław Gomułka, the then First Secretary of the Polish United Workers' Party, as well as members of the PUWP and the Polish Council of State. The parade inspector was Marshal of Poland Marian Spychalski while it was commanded by the commander of the Warsaw Military District Major General Czesław Waryszak (1919–1979). Troops of the Polish People's Army were on parade, featuring units such as the Representative Honor Guard of the LWP, the Band of the LWP (led by Colonel Lisztok), as well as cadets of military academies and other ceremonial units dressed in Polish historical military uniforms dating back to the Piast dynasty. The parade is today regarded as the largest military parade in the history of Poland.

== See also ==
- Catholic Church in Poland
- Lech, Czech, and Rus
- Christianization of Bohemia
- Christianization of Kievan Rus'
- Dagome Iudex
- History of Poland (966–1385)
- List of archbishops of Gniezno and primates of Poland
- Northern Crusades
