= Standesamt Margonin =

Standesamt Margonin was a civil registration district (Standesamt) located in Kreis Kolmar, Posen of the German Empire (1871–1918) and administered 21 communities.

Communities
Community	Polish name	Type	1895 Pop	Prot	Cath	Jew	Civil Ofc	Police Ofc	Court Ofc	Cath. Ch	Prot. Ch	Notes	More
Margonin		Town	1776	751	916	109	Mar	Mar	Mar	Mar	Mar
Alyrode	Studzce	Village	222	206	16		Mar	Kol	Kol	Kol	Mar		KM
Josephowo		Village	121	110	11		Mar	Sam	Mar	Mar	Mar
Klothildenhof		Estate	113	97	16		Mar	Bud	Mar	Mar	Mar
Kowalewo		Village	118	36	73	8	Mar	Bud	Mar	Mar	Mar
Lipin		Village	254	162	85		Mar	Sam	Mar	Mar	Mar
Lipin Hauland	Lipinskie Oledry	Village	100	93	2		Mar	Sam	Mar	Mar	Mar
Margonin F	Margonin	forestry
Margoninsdorf	Margonska Wies	Estate	507	133	374		Mar	Sam	Mar	Mar	Mar
Margoninsdorf	Margonska Wies	Village	56	5	51		Mar	Sam	Kol	Mar	Mar
Obermühle		Estate	47	23	24		Mar	Sam	Mar	Mar	Mar
Prochnowo		Estate	464	1	463		Mar	Bud	Mar	Wil	Mar
Sagemühle		Estate	47	26	21		Mar	Sam	Mar	Mar	Mar
Schmiedenau
Seeort	Sypniewo	Village	206	147	53		Mar	Bud	Mar	Mar	Mar
Sulaszewo
Sulaszewo F		forestry
Wesrednik F	Wesrednik	forestry
Wilhelmstreu		Village	192	28	164		Mar	Bud	Mar	Wil	Mar
Wittkowitz		Village	35	34	1		Mar	Bud	Mar	Mar	Mar
Zbyszewice		Estate	396	9	387		Mar	Bud	Mar	Mar	Mar

Bud = Budsin; Kol = Kolmar; Mar = Margonin; Wil = Wilhelmstreu

== Geography ==
Margonin was on the north end of a finger lake, where a mill stream emptied the lake into the Netze (Polish: Noteć) River. The Margonin lake dominated the southern portion of the area, blocking east–west traffic. North of Margonin lay Standesamt Samotschin. A bridge crossed the river, providing access to southern Kreis Wirsitz. West of Margonin, the road and railroad diverged on their way to Kreis' seat of Kolmar (Chodziesen; Polish: Chodzież).

The railroad swung north to Samotschin before following the bluff overlooking the river plain. The road ran westward and then swung north to follow the railroad through to Kolmar. In the other direction, the road and railroad ran east and a little south, towards Gollantsch and Kreis Exin, passing through the strip of Kreis Wongrowitz that claims a small piece of the Netze riverbank. The only major road to the south exited Margonin at the southeast, and arched east on its way to the town of Wongrowitz, seat of its Kreis.

Woods sheltered the east of the lake, ran northeast past the Margoninsdorf estate and forestry school, and northwest, on the western side of the stream. Several mills shared the stream there. Aside from the mills, very little industry existed, save from weavers in the early days, and some brewing, conducted by the small Jewish population.

Margonin was a market town, and had churches for all three faiths. The Catholic parish church belonged to the deanery of Czarnikau, which was part of the Posen diocese.

The town suffered destruction by the Swedes, by floods, and cholera.
