= Standesamt Budsin =

Standesamt Budsin was a civil registration district (Standesamt) located in Kreis Kolmar, province of Posen of the German Empire (1871–1918) and administered the communities of:

| Community | Polish name | Type | 1895 Pop | Prot | Cath | Jew | Civil Ofc | Police Ofc | Court Ofc | Cath. Ch | Prot. Ch |
|---|---|---|---|---|---|---|---|---|---|---|---|
| Budsin | Budzyń | Town | 1910 | 741 | 1081 | 88 | Bud | Bud | Kol | Bud | Bud |
| Aschenforth | | Village | 162 | 142 | 20 | | Bud | Bud | Kol | Bud | Jan |
| Braknitz | | Village | 255 | 193 | 62 | | Bud | Bud | Kol | Bud | Bud |
| Grünwald, F | | Estate | 28 | 26 | 2 | | Bud | Bud | Kol | Rit | Gra |
| Jankendorf | | Village | 712 | 530 | 182 | | Bud | Bud | Kol | Bud | Jan |
| Kunkolewo | | Estate | 78 | 49 | 29 | | Bud | Bud | Kol | Bud | Bud |
| Nuebuden | | Estate | 46 | 40 | 6 | | Bud | Bud | Kol | Bud | Jan |
| Neuhütte | | Village | 191 | 190 | 1 | | Bud | Bud | Kol | Cza | Gem |
| Prossen | | Estate | 148 | 21 | 120 | 7 | Bud | Bud | Kol | Kol | Gra |
| Prossen | | Village | 187 | 53 | 134 | | Bud | Bud | Kol | Kol | Gra |
| Ostrowke | | Village | 368 | 323 | 45 | | Bud | Bud | Kol | Kol | Kol |
| Segenfelde | | Village | 253 | 177 | 76 | | Bud | Bud | Kol | Kol, Rit | Gra |
| Siebenschlößchen | | Village | 381 | 256 | 121 | 4 | Bud | Bud | Mar | Wil | Bud |
| Wischen | | Estate | 167 | 21 | 146 | | Bud | Bud | Kol | Gra | Gra |
| Wischen | | Village | 183 | 13 | 170 | | Bud | Bud | Kol | Rit | Gra |
| Wischen Hauland | | Village | 391 | 389 | 2 | | Bud | Bud | Kol | Rit | Gra |
| Wischen Neudorf | | Village | 287 | 246 | 41 | | Bud | Bud | Kol | Rit | Gra |

Bud = Budsin; Cza = Czarnikau, Kr Czarnikau; Gra = Gramsdorf, Kr Obornik; Jan = Jankendorf; Kol = Kolmar; Mar = Margonin; Rit = Ritschenwalde, Kr. Wirsitz; Wil = Wilhelmstreu
Population data may be inaccurate (see German census of 1895).
