= Kreis Kolmar in Posen =

Location of Kreis Kolmar in Posen

The Kreis Kolmar in Posen (1818–1877 Kreis Chodziesen) was a district in the northern government region of Bromberg, in the Prussian Province of Posen, from 1818 to 1920. The district capital was Kolmar in Posen.

== History ==
The district of Chodziesen was formed in 1818. It became part of the German Empire in 1871. On 6 March 1877, the district and the district town of Chodziesen were renamed Kolmar in Posen. On 1 April 1914 the city of Schneidemühl was disentangled from the district and became an independent town (Stadtkreis) within the Bromberg Region.

On 27 December 1918, the Greater Poland uprising began in the province of Posen. Except for the south of the district around the town of Budsin, the Kolmar district remained largely under German control. On 16 February 1919, an armistice ended the Polish-German fighting. On 28 June 1919, with the signing of the Treaty of Versailles, the German government officially ceded most of the district including the capital Kolmar to the newly founded Second Polish Republic.

On 25 November 1919, Germany and Poland concluded an agreement on the evacuation and surrender of the areas to be ceded, which was ratified on 10 January 1920. The area to be ceded was cleared and handed over to Poland between 17 January and 4 February 1920.

Only the rural communities of Schönfeld, Stöwen and Usch Hauland in the northern part of the Kolmar district remained in Germany after this, as did the city of Schneidemühl. These areas became part of the newly formed Prussian Province of Grenzmark Posen-West Prussia. Schönfeld became part of the Flatow district, while Stöwen and Usch Hauland became part of the newly formed Netzekreis district.

== Demographics ==
According to the census of 1849 the district had a population of 46,353 of whom 32,739 (71%) were Germans and 13,614 (29%) were Poles and others.

Ethnolinguistic structure of Kreis Kolmar in Posen
Year	Population	German		Polish / Bilingual / Other	
1831	34,086	24,959	73.2%	9,127	26.8%
1846	45,567	33,012	72.4%	12,553	27.5%
1849	46,353	32,739	70.6%	13,614	29.4%
1905	69,851	56,846	81.4%	13,005	18.6%
1910	76,020	61,600	81.0%	14,420	19.0%

== Table of Standesämter ==
"Standesamt" is the German name of the local civil registration offices which were established in October 1874 soon after the German Empire was formed. Births, marriages and deaths were recorded. Previously, only the church records were used for Christians.

Standesamt	Polish name
Budsin	Budzyń
Kolmar	Chodzież
Dziembowo	Dziembowo
Margonin	Margonin
Podanin	Podanin
Podstolitz	Podstolice
Samotschin	Szamocin
Schneidemühl	Piła
Usch	Ujście
Zachasberg	Zacharzyn

== Military command ==
Kreis Kolmar was part of the military command (German: Bezirkskommando) at Schneidemühl, which was the garrison of the 149th Infanterie regiment (6th Westpreußisches) of the 74. Inf. Brigade. Created 31 March 1897. Also, since 1913, the home of the 5th Luftschiffer- Bataillon (Zeppelins).

== Court system ==
The main court (German: Landgericht) was in Schneidemühl, with subject courts (German: Amtsgericht) in the district capital Kolmar in Posen and Margonin.

== Police districts ==
Police districts (German: Polizeidistrikt) were administered from the towns of Budsin, Kolmar, Samotschin, Schneidemühl and Usch.
