= Standesamt Zachasberg =

Standesamt Zachasberg was a civil registration district (Standesamt) located in Kreis Kolmar, province of Posen of the German Empire (1871-1918) and administered the communities of:

| Community | Polish name | Type | 1895 Pop | Prot | Cath | Jew | Civil Ofc | Police Ofc | Court Ofc | Cath. Ch | Prot. Ch | Notes | More |
| Zachasberg | Zacharzyn | Village | 882 | 786 | 96 | | Zac | Kol | Kol | Kol | Zac |
| Augustenau | Wymysław | Village | 232 | 175 | 57 | | Zac | Kol | Kol | Kol | Zac |
| Neu Strelitz | Strzelęcin | Village | 136 | 110 | 26 | | Zac | Kol | Kol | Kol | Zac |
| Strelitz | Strzelce | Estate | 366 | 216 | 150 | | Zac | Kol | Kol | Zac | Zac |
| Strelitz Hauland | Strzelczyki | Village | 171 | 165 | 6 | | Zac | Sam | Mar | Kol | Zac |

Kol = Kolmar; Mar = Margonin; Sam = Samotschin; Zac = Zachasberg
