= Standesamt Dziembowo =

German Empire civil registration district

Standesamt Dziembowo was a civil registration district (Standesamt) located in Kreis Kolmar, province of Posen of the German Empire (1871-1918) and administered the communities of:

Community	Polish name	Type	1895 Pop	Prot	Cath	Jew	Civil Ofc	Police Ofc	Court Ofc	Cath. Ch	Prot. Ch	Notes	More
Dziembowo		Estate	414	286	128		Dzi	Usc	Sch	Mor	Dzi
Dziembowo		Village	541	39	499	3	Dzi	Usc	Sch	Mor	Dzi
Byschke		Estate	84	14	70		Dzi	Usc	Sch	Usc	Dzi
Byschke		Village	216	4	212		Dzi	Usc	Sch	Usc	Dzi
Erpel		Village	476	284	192		Dzi	Sch	Sch	Schm	Fri
Liebenthal (Erpel)		Estate	105	43	62		Dzi	Usc	Sch	Mor	Fri
Morzewo		Village	829	4	819	6	Dzi	Usc	Sch	Mor	Fri

Dzi = Dziembowo; Fri = Friedheim, Kr Wirsitz; Mor = Morzewo; Sch = Schneidemühl; Usc = Usch

This article is part of the project Wikipedia:WikiProject Prussian Standesamter. Please refer to the project page, before making changes.
