= Nadolnik, Chodzież County =

Nadolnik
- Village
- Location within Poland
- Coordinates: 53°1′52″N 17°3′35″E
- Country: Poland
- Voivodeship: Greater Poland
- County: Chodzież
- Gmina: Szamocin

Nadolnik [naˈdɔlnik] is a village in the administrative district of Gmina Szamocin, within Chodzież County, Greater Poland Voivodeship, in west-central Poland.
