= Nowawieś Wyszyńska =

- Village
- Location within Poland
- Coordinates: 52°52′7″N 16°53′10″E
- Country: Poland
- Voivodeship: Greater Poland
- County: Chodzież
- Gmina: Budzyń
- Population: 100

Nowawieś Wyszyńska [nɔˈvavjɛɕ vɨˈʂɨɲska] is a village in the administrative district of Gmina Budzyń, within Chodzież County, Greater Poland Voivodeship, in west-central Poland.
