= Nowy Młyn =

Nowy Młyn (meaning "new mill") may refer to the following places in Poland:

- Nowy Mlyn, a neighbourhood in the Nowe Miasto district of Poznań
- Nowy Młyn, Chodzież County in Greater Poland Voivodeship (west-central Poland)
- Nowy Młyn, Międzychód County in Greater Poland Voivodeship (west-central Poland)
- Nowy Młyn, Oborniki County in Greater Poland Voivodeship (west-central Poland)
- Nowy Młyn, Kuyavian-Pomeranian Voivodeship (north-central Poland)
- Nowy Młyn, Lubusz Voivodeship (west Poland)
- Nowy Młyn, Strzelce-Drezdenko County in Lubusz Voivodeship (west Poland)
- Nowy Młyn, Opole Voivodeship (south-west Poland)
- Nowy Młyn, Pomeranian Voivodeship (north Poland)
- Nowy Młyn, Kętrzyn County in Warmian-Masurian Voivodeship (north Poland)
- Nowy Młyn, Olecko County in Warmian-Masurian Voivodeship (north Poland)
- Nowy Młyn, Olsztyn County in Warmian-Masurian Voivodeship (north Poland)
