= Nowe Brzeźno, Greater Poland Voivodeship =

Nowe Brzeźno
- Village
- Location within Poland
- Coordinates: 52°50′42″N 17°02′42″E
- Country: Poland
- Voivodeship: Greater Poland
- County: Chodzież
- Gmina: Budzyń

Nowe Brzeźno [ˈnɔvɛ ˈbʐɛʑnɔ] is a village in the administrative district of Gmina Budzyń, within Chodzież County, Greater Poland Voivodeship, in west-central Poland.
