= Borowo =

Borowo may refer to the following places:

- Borowo, Lipno County in Kuyavian-Pomeranian Voivodeship (north-central Poland)
- Borowo, Gmina Bytoń in Kuyavian-Pomeranian Voivodeship (central Poland)
- Borowo, Gmina Dobre in Kuyavian-Pomeranian Voivodeship (central Poland)
- Borowo, Rypin County in Kuyavian-Pomeranian Voivodeship (north-central Poland)
- Borowo, Lublin Voivodeship (east Poland)
- Borowo, Lipsko County in Masovian Voivodeship (east-central Poland)
- Borowo, Płock County in Masovian Voivodeship (central Poland)
- Borowo, Sierpc County in Masovian Voivodeship (north-central Poland)
- Borowo, Chodzież County in Greater Poland Voivodeship (west-central Poland)
- Borowo, Konin County in Greater Poland Voivodeship (central Poland)
- Borowo, Kościan County in Greater Poland Voivodeship (west-central Poland)
- Borowo, Gmina Krzykosy, Środa County in Greater Poland Voivodeship (west-central Poland)
- Borowo, Kartuzy County in Pomeranian Voivodeship (north Poland)
- Borowo, Wejherowo County in Pomeranian Voivodeship (north Poland)
- Borowo, West Pomeranian Voivodeship (north-west Poland)
