= Lipa, Chodzież County =

Lipa
- Village
- Location within Poland
- Coordinates: 53°3′N 17°17′E
- Country: Poland
- Voivodeship: Greater Poland
- County: Chodzież
- Gmina: Szamocin

Lipa [ˈlipa] is a village in the administrative district of Gmina Szamocin, within Chodzież County, Greater Poland Voivodeship, in west-central Poland.
