= Studzieniec, Chodzież County =

Studzieniec
- Village
- Location within Poland
- Coordinates: 53°1′48″N 16°53′33″E
- Country: Poland
- Voivodeship: Greater Poland
- County: Chodzież
- Gmina: Chodzież
- Population: 97

Studzieniec [stuˈd͡ʑɛɲɛt͡s] (German: Studsin, Studzyn) is a village in the administrative district of Gmina Chodzież, within Chodzież County, Greater Poland Voivodeship, in west-central Poland.
