= Oleśnica (disambiguation) =

Oleśnica is a town in Lower Silesian Voivodeship (south-west Poland).

Oleśnica may also refer to:

- Oleśnica, Poddębice County in Łódź Voivodeship (central Poland)
- Oleśnica, Wieluń County in Łódź Voivodeship (central Poland)
- Oleśnica, Lesser Poland Voivodeship (south Poland)
- Oleśnica, Świętokrzyskie Voivodeship (south-central Poland)
- Oleśnica, Masovian Voivodeship (east-central Poland)
- Oleśnica, Chodzież County in Greater Poland Voivodeship (west-central Poland)
- Oleśnica, Słupca County in Greater Poland Voivodeship (west-central Poland)
