= Stróżewice =

- Village
- Location within Poland
- Coordinates: 52°55′49″N 16°51′46″E
- Country: Poland
- Voivodeship: Greater Poland
- County: Chodzież
- Gmina: Chodzież
- Population: 209

Stróżewice [struʐɛˈvit͡sɛ] is a village in the administrative district of Gmina Chodzież, within Chodzież County, Greater Poland Voivodeship, in west-central Poland.
