= Stróżewko, Greater Poland Voivodeship =

Stróżewko
- Village
- Location within Poland
- Coordinates: 52°57′8″N 16°53′56″E
- Country: Poland
- Voivodeship: Greater Poland
- County: Chodzież
- Gmina: Chodzież
- Population: 68

Stróżewko [struˈʐɛfkɔ] is a village in the administrative district of Gmina Chodzież, within Chodzież County, Greater Poland Voivodeship, in west-central Poland.
