= Jaktorowo =

- Village
- Location within Poland
- Coordinates: 53°2′4″N 17°14′10″E
- Country: Poland
- Voivodeship: Greater Poland
- County: Chodzież
- Gmina: Szamocin
- Population: 170

Jaktorowo [jaktɔˈrɔvɔ] is a village in the administrative district of Gmina Szamocin, within Chodzież County, Greater Poland Voivodeship, in west-central Poland.
