= Ewaryst Estkowski =

Polish academic and activist (1820–1856)

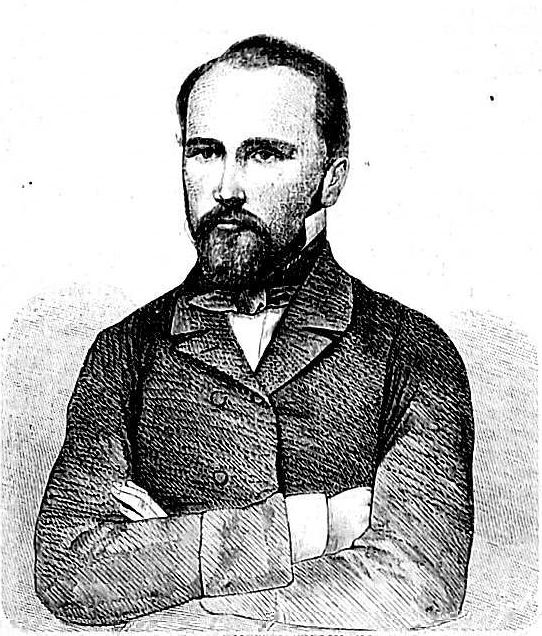
Ewaryst Estkowski

Ewaryst Estkowski (26 October 1820 – 15 August 1856) was a Polish teacher, education activist, and editor of Szkoła Polska (Polish School) magazine. Ewaryst Estkowski died 1856 in Germany Bad Soden am Taunus near Frankfurt Main.

== Biography ==
Estkowski was born in the village of Drzązgowo, Chodzież County, to Jan Estkowski and Katarzyna Estkowska.
