= Prosna (disambiguation) =

The Prosna is a river in central Poland.

Prosna may also refer to the following villages:

- Prosna, Greater Poland Voivodeship (west-central Poland)
- Prosna, Masovian Voivodeship (east-central Poland)
- Prosna, Opole Voivodeship (south-west Poland)
- Prosna, Warmian-Masurian Voivodeship (north Poland)
