= Mirowo =

Mirowo may refer to the following places:

- Mirowo, Greater Poland Voivodeship (west-central Poland)
- Mirowo, Pomeranian Voivodeship (north Poland)
- Mirowo, Warmian-Masurian Voivodeship (north Poland)
- Mirowo, Gryfino County in West Pomeranian Voivodeship (north-west Poland)
- Mirowo, Kołobrzeg County in West Pomeranian Voivodeship (north-west Poland)
