= Standesamt Podstolitz =

Standesamt Podstolitz was a civil registration district (Standesamt) located in Kreis Kolmar, province of Posen of the German Empire (1871-1918) and administered the communities of:

Community	Polish name	Type	1895 Pop	Prot	Cath	Jew	Civil Ofc	Police Ofc	Court Ofc	Cath. Ch	Prot. Ch	Notes	More
Podstolitz		Estate	97	38	59		Pods	Bud	Mar	Kol	Bud
Podstolitz		Village	306	290	16		Pods	Bud	Mar	Kol	Bud
Kunkolewo Hauland		Village	46	34	12		Pods	Bud	Kol	Bud	Bud
Radwonke		Village	520	429	91		Pods	Bud	Mar	Kol	Mar

Bud = Budsin; Kol = Kolmar; Mar = Margonin; Pods = Podstolitz
