= Borówki =

Borówki may refer to the following places in Poland:

- Borówki, Lower Silesian Voivodeship (south-west Poland)
- Borówki, Kuyavian-Pomeranian Voivodeship (north-central Poland)
- Borówki, Subcarpathian Voivodeship (south-east Poland)
- Borówki, Greater Poland Voivodeship (west-central Poland)
