= Niewiemko =

- Village
- Location within Poland
- Coordinates: 52°54′17″N 16°46′53″E
- Country: Poland
- Voivodeship: Greater Poland
- County: Chodzież
- Gmina: Budzyń

Niewiemko [ɲɛˈvjɛmkɔ] is a village in the administrative district of Gmina Budzyń, within Chodzież County, Greater Poland Voivodeship, in west-central Poland.
