= Józefowice, Greater Poland Voivodeship =

Józefowice
- Village
- Location within Poland
- Coordinates: 53°2′24″N 17°4′53″E
- Country: Poland
- Voivodeship: Greater Poland
- County: Chodzież
- Gmina: Szamocin
- Population: 150

Józefowice Polish: [juzɛfɔˈvit͡sɛ] is a village in the administrative district of Gmina Szamocin, within Chodzież County, Greater Poland Voivodeship, in west-central Poland.
