= Podanin =

- Village
- Location within Poland
- Coordinates: 52°57′13″N 16°56′29″E
- Country: Poland
- Voivodeship: Greater Poland
- County: Chodzież
- Gmina: Chodzież
- Population: 492

Podanin [pɔˈdanin] is a village in the administrative district of Gmina Chodzież, within Chodzież County, Greater Poland Voivodeship, in west-central Poland.

== See also ==
- Standesamt Podanin
