= Radwanki, Greater Poland Voivodeship =

Radwanki
- Village
- Location within Poland
- Coordinates: 52°57′N 17°1′E
- Country: Poland
- Voivodeship: Greater Poland
- County: Chodzież
- Gmina: Margonin

Radwanki (Polish: [raˈdvaŋkʲi]) is a village in the administrative district of Gmina Margonin, within Chodzież County, Greater Poland Voivodeship, in west-central Poland.
