= Jaktorówko =

- Settlement
- Location within Poland
- Coordinates: 53°2′13″N 17°12′27″E
- Country: Poland
- Voivodeship: Greater Poland
- County: Chodzież
- Gmina: Szamocin

Jaktorówko [jaktɔˈrufkɔ] is a settlement in the administrative district of Gmina Szamocin, within Chodzież County, Greater Poland Voivodeship, in west-central Poland.

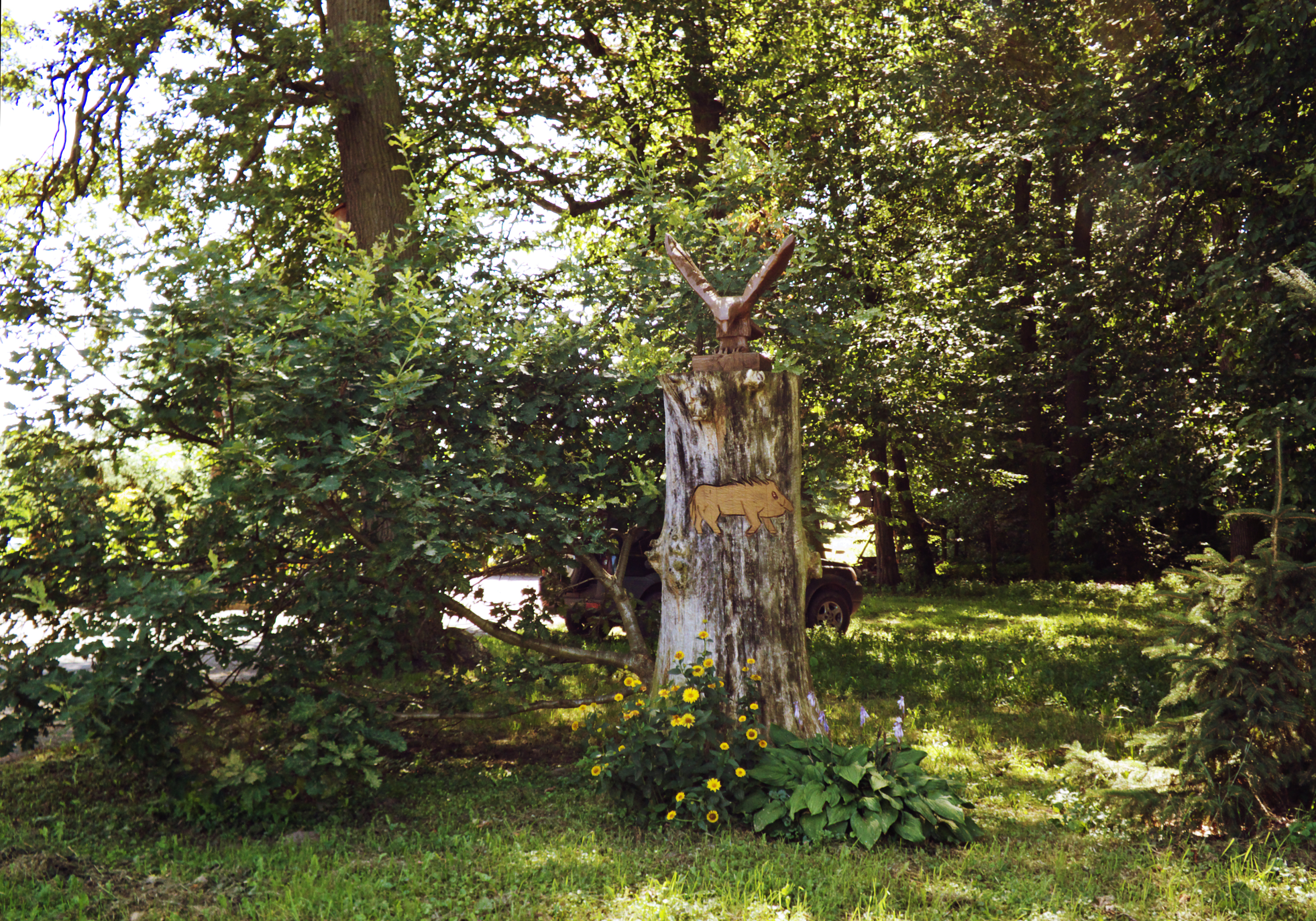
Jaktorówko forest, where the last recorded aurochs died.
