= Leśniczówka, Greater Poland Voivodeship =

Leśniczówka
- Settlement
- Location within Poland
- Coordinates: 53°1′30″N 17°8′34″E
- Country: Poland
- Voivodeship: Greater Poland
- County: Chodzież
- Gmina: Szamocin

Leśniczówka (Polish pronunciation: [lɛɕɲiˈtʂufka]) is a settlement in the administrative district of Gmina Szamocin, within Chodzież County, Greater Poland Voivodeship, in west-central Poland.
