= Szamoty, Greater Poland Voivodeship =

Szamoty
- Village
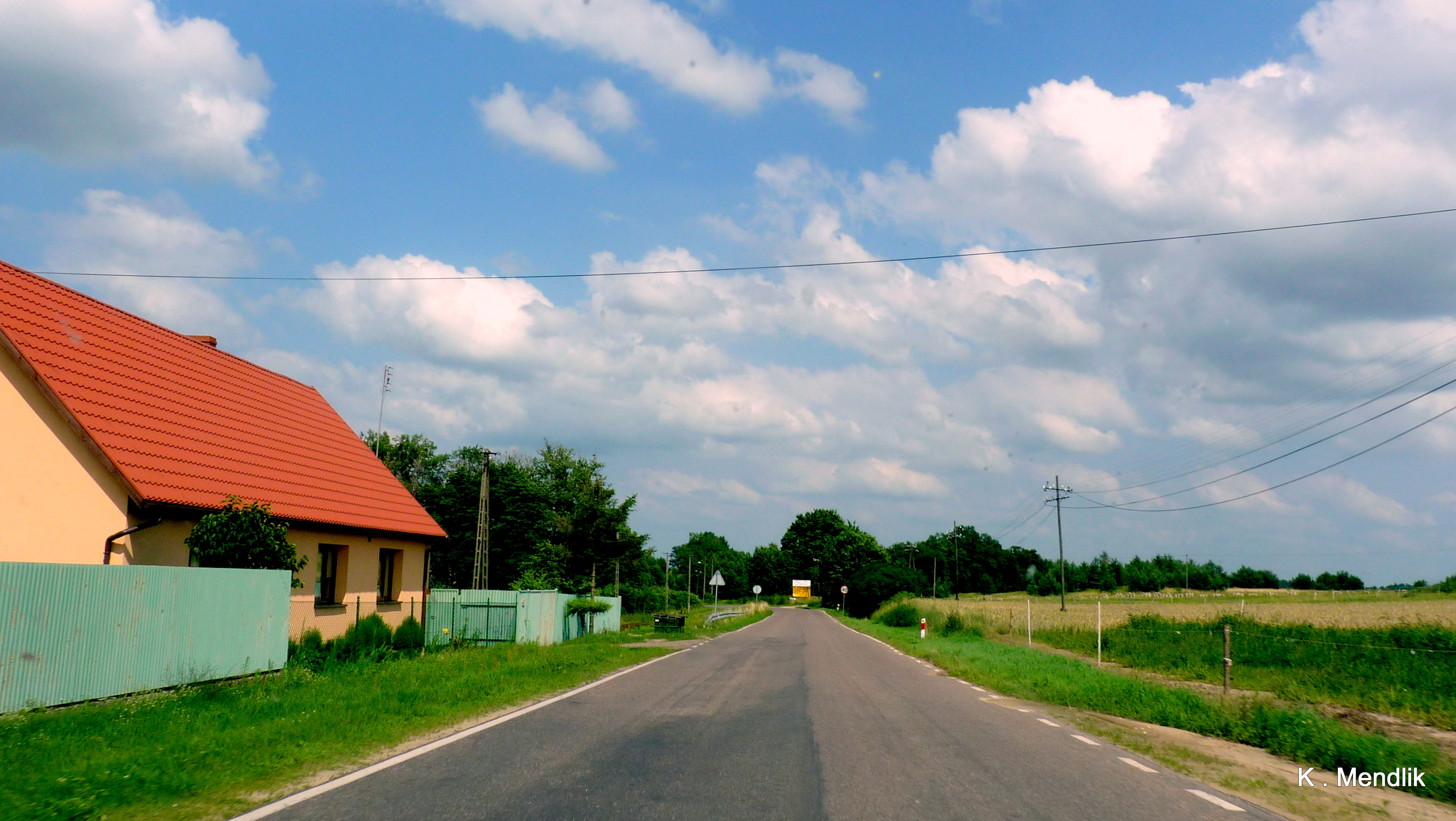

- Location within Poland
- Coordinates: 53°3′N 17°9′E
- Country: Poland
- Voivodeship: Greater Poland
- County: Chodzież
- Gmina: Szamocin
- Time zone: UTC+1 (CET)
  - Summer (DST): UTC+2 (CEST)
- Vehicle registration: PCH

Szamoty [ʂaˈmɔtɨ] is a village in the administrative district of Gmina Szamocin, within Chodzież County, Greater Poland Voivodeship, in west-central Poland.
