= Standesamt Usch =

Standesamt Usch was a civil registration district (Standesamt) located in Kreis Kolmar, province of Posen of the German Empire (1871–1918) and administered the communities of:

Community	Polish name	Type	1895 Pop	Prot	Cath	Jew	Civil Ofc	Police Ofc	Court Ofc	Cath. Ch	Prot. Ch	Notes	More
Miroslaw		Estate	127	78	49		Usc	Usc	Sch	Usc	Usc
Wilhelmshöhe		Estate	61	36	25		Usc	Usc	Sch	Usc	Usc
Miroslaw		Village	107	47	60		Usc	Usc	Sch	Usc	Usc
Usch		Town	2466	809	1588	69	Usc	Usc	Sch	Usc	Usc
Jablonowo Abbau		Village	42	41	1		Usc	Usc	Kol	Usc	Usc
Nowen		Estate	62	33	29		Usc	Usc	Kol	Usc	Usc
Jablonowo		Estate	187	137	50		Usc	Usc	Kol	Usc	Usc
Kahlstädt		Village	576	503	73		Usc	Usc	Kol	Usc	Usc
Usch Neudorf		Village	1392	680	712		Usc	Usc	Sch	Usc	Usc
Chrostowo		Village	185	87	98		Usc	Usc	Kol	Usc	Usc

Kol = Kolmar; Sch = Schneidemühl; Usc = Usch
Population data may be inaccurate (see German census of 1895).
