= Kierzkowice, Greater Poland Voivodeship =

Kierzkowice
- Village
- Location within Poland
- Coordinates: 53°0′30″N 16°51′33″E
- Country: Poland
- Voivodeship: Greater Poland
- County: Chodzież
- Gmina: Chodzież
- Population: 49

Kierzkowice [kʲɛʂkɔˈvit͡sɛ] is a village in the administrative district of Gmina Chodzież, within Chodzież County, Greater Poland Voivodeship, in west-central Poland.
