= Kamionka, Chodzież County =

Kamionka
- Village
- Location within Poland
- Coordinates: 53°1′11″N 16°51′24″E
- Country: Poland
- Voivodeship: Greater Poland
- County: Chodzież
- Gmina: Chodzież
- Population: 64

Kamionka ([kaˈmjɔnka]; German: Kamionke, 1939–45 Kamke) is a village in the administrative district of Gmina Chodzież, within Chodzież County, Greater Poland Voivodeship, in west-central Poland.
