= Sokolec =

Sokolec may refer to the following places:

- Sokolec, Lower Silesian Voivodeship (south-west Poland)
- Sokolec, Greater Poland Voivodeship (west-central Poland)
- Sokoleč (Czech Republic)
