= Standesamt Schneidemühl =

Standesamt Schneidemühl was a civil registration district (Standesamt) in Kreis Kolmar, province of Posen of the German Empire (1871–1918). The administration offices were in the town of Schneidemühl, with both urban and rural sub-offices, and administered the communities of:

| Community | Polish name | Type | 1895 Pop | Prot | Cath | Jew | Civil Ofc | Police Ofc | Court Ofc | Cath. Ch | Prot. Ch |
|---|---|---|---|---|---|---|---|---|---|---|---|
| Schneidemühl | Piła | Town | 7050 | 0496 | 5679 | 782 | Sch (S) | Sch | Sch | Sch | Sch |
| Bergthal | | Village | 293 | 167 | 126 | | Sch (L) | Sch | Sch | Fri | Fri |
| Brodden | Brody | Village | 593 | 533 | 52 | | Sch (L) | Sch | Sch | Schm | Bro |
| Gönne | | Estate | 69 | 41 | 28 | | Sch (L) | Sch | Sch | Sch | Sch |
| Motylewo | Motylewo | Village | 451 | 361 | 90 | | Sch (L) | Sch | Sch | Sch | Sch |
| Plöttke | | Estate | 110 | 52 | 58 | | Sch (L) | Sch | Sch | Sch | Sch |
| Rownopole | Równopole | Village | 384 | 89 | 295 | | Sch (L) | Sch | Sch | Fri | Fri |
| Rzadkowo | Rzadkowo | Estate | 261 | 18 | 243 | | Sch (L) | Sch | Sch | Fri | Fri |
| Rzadkowo | Rzadkowo | Village | 380 | 20 | 360 | | Sch (L) | Sch | Sch | Fri | Fri |
| Schönfeld | | Village | 604 | 498 | 106 | | Sch (L) | Sch | Sch | Schm | Kro |
| Selgenau | | Estate | 172 | 39 | 133 | | Sch (L) | Sch | Sch | Schm | Bro |
| Selgenau | | Village | 433 | 293 | 136 | 4 | Sch (L) | Sch | Sch | Schm | Bro |
| Selgenau, OF | | Estate | 69 | 52 | 17 | | Sch (L) | Sch | Sch | Schm | Bro |
| Schmilau | | Village | 839 | 399 | 440 | | Sch (L) | Sch | Sch | Schm | Bro |
| Stöwen | | Village | 770 | 476 | 294 | | Sch (L) | Sch | Sch | Sch | Sch |
| Stüsselsdorf | | Village | 318 | 207 | 111 | | Sch (L) | Sch | Sch | Schm | Bro |
| Usch Hauland | | Village | 660 | 564 | 96 | | Sch (L) | Usc | Sch | Sch | Usc |
| Zbyschwitz | | Village | 159 | 111 | 48 | | Sch (L) | Sch | Sch | Fri | Fri |

Bro = Brodden; Fri = Friedheim, Kr Wirsitz; Kro = Krojanke, Kr Flatow, West Prussia; Mar = Margonin; Schm = Schmilau; Sch = Schneidemühl ; Sch (S) = Schneidemühl (town); Sch (L) = Schneidemühl (rural area); Usc = Usch
OF = head forester
Population data may be inaccurate (see German census of 1895).
