= Laskowo =

Laskowo may refer to:

- Laskowo, Chodzież County in Greater Poland Voivodeship (west-central Poland)
- Laskowo, Żnin County in Kuyavian-Pomeranian Voivodeship (north-central Poland)
- Laskowo, Mogilno County in Kuyavian-Pomeranian Voivodeship (north-central Poland)
- Laskowo, Oborniki County in Greater Poland Voivodeship (west-central Poland)
- Laskowo, Złotów County in Greater Poland Voivodeship (west-central Poland)
- Laskowo, Lubusz Voivodeship (west Poland)
- Laskowo, West Pomeranian Voivodeship (north-west Poland)
