= Nowy Dwór, Chodzież County =

Nowy Dwór
- Village
- Location within Poland
- Coordinates: 53°03′10″N 17°17′22″E
- Country: Poland
- Voivodeship: Greater Poland
- County: Chodzież
- Gmina: Szamocin

Nowy Dwór [ˈnɔvɨ ˈdvur] is a village in the administrative district of Gmina Szamocin, within Chodzież County, Greater Poland Voivodeship, in west-central Poland.
