= Nałęcza =

- Village
- Location within Poland
- Coordinates: 53°2′16.4″N 17°4′0.2″E
- Country: Poland
- Voivodeship: Greater Poland
- County: Chodzież
- Gmina: Szamocin
- Population: 319

Nałęcza [naˈwɛnt͡ʂa] is a village in the administrative district of Gmina Szamocin, within Chodzież County, Greater Poland Voivodeship, in west-central Poland. It had a population of 319 in 2006.
