= Kosarzyn, Greater Poland Voivodeship =

Kosarzyn
- Village
- Location within Poland
- Coordinates: 53°02′18″N 17°05′28″E
- Country: Poland
- Voivodeship: Greater Poland
- County: Chodzież
- Gmina: Szamocin

Kosarzyn ([kɔˈsaʐɨn]; German: Hammermühle) is a village in the administrative district of Gmina Szamocin, within Chodzież County, Greater Poland Voivodeship, in west-central Poland.
