= Ciszewo, Greater Poland Voivodeship =

Ciszewo
- Village
- Location within Poland
- Coordinates: 53°2′40″N 16°52′19″E
- Country: Poland
- Voivodeship: Greater Poland
- County: Chodzież
- Gmina: Chodzież
- Population: 4

Ciszewo [t͡ɕiˈʂɛvɔ] is a village in the administrative district of Gmina Chodzież, within Chodzież County, Greater Poland Voivodeship, in west-central Poland.
