= Rataje, Chodzież County =

Rataje
- Village
- Location within Poland
- Coordinates: 52°59′55″N 16°56′52″E
- Country: Poland
- Voivodeship: Greater Poland
- County: Chodzież
- Gmina: Chodzież
- Population: 799

Rataje [raˈtajɛ] is a village in the administrative district of Gmina Chodzież, within Chodzież County, Greater Poland Voivodeship, in west-central Poland.
