= Standesamt Samotschin =

Standesamt Samotschin was a civil registration district (Standesamt) in Kreis Kolmar, Province of Posen of the German Empire (1871-1918). The administration offices were located in the town of Samotschin, with both urban and rural sub-offices, and administered the communities of:	More information about these communities can be found in the general articles: Szamocin (prev. Samotschin)

Community	Polish name	Type	1895 Pop	Prot	Cath	Jew	Civil Ofc	Police Ofc	Court Ofc	Cath. Ch	Prot. Ch	Notes	More
Samotschin	Szamocin	Town	2079	1321	535	223	Sam (S)	Sam	Mar	Mar	Sam
Samotschin	Szamocin	Estate	812	406	403	3	Sam (S)	Sam	Mar	Mar	Sam
Antonienhof	Antoniny	Village	285	258	27		Sam (S)	Sam	Mar	Mar	Rat
Athanasienhof	Atanazyn	Village	351	282	69		Sam (S)	Sam	Mar	Mar	Sam
Freundsthal		Village	222	200	22		Sam (S)	Sam	Mar	Mar	Sam
Josephsruh	Jozefowice	Village	324	315	9		Sam (S)	Sam	Mar	Mar	Sam
Laskowo	Laskowo	Village	542	397	145		Sam (S)	Sam	Mar	Mar	Sam
Ludwigslust		Colony	abt 230									Part of Samotschin estate
Mariannenhof		Colony	abt 245									Part of Samotschin estate
Nalentscha	Nalecza	Village	211	209	2		Sam (S)	Sam	Mar	Mar	Sam
Ratschin	Ratczyn	Village	520	495	25		Sam (S)	Sam	Mar	Mar	Rat
Samotschin Hammermühle	Hamer	Estate	44	37	7		Sam (S)	Sam	Mar	Mar	Sam
Samotschin Netzedamm		Tollhouse	abt 15									Part of Samotschin estate
Seefeld		Colony	abt 60									Part of Samotschin estate
Smolary	Smolary	Village	331	44	284	3	Sam (S)	Sam	Kol	Mar	Sam	Part of Samotschin estate?
Borowo	Borowo	Village	239	139	100		Sam (L)	Sam	Mar	cho	Sam
Freirode	Swoboda	Village	179	88	91		Sam (L)	Sam	Mar	Jak	Lin
Heliodorowo	Heliodorowo	Village	716	592	124		Sam (L)	Sam	Mar	Mar	Sam
Jaktorowo	Jaktorowo	Estate	698	81	617		Sam (L)	Sam	Mar	Jak	Lin
Liepe	Lipa	Village	458	261	185	12	Sam (L)	Sam	Mar	Jak	Lin
Lindenwerder	Lipia Gora	Village	1344	1125	215	4	Sam (L)	Sam	Mar	Jak	Lin
Sokolitz	Sokolec	Village	267	204	56		Sam (L)	Sam, Kkol	Mar	Jak	Lin
Waldthal (Borowo Hauland)	Borowskie Oledry	Village	137	114	23		Sam (L)	Sam	Mar	Mar	Sam

Jak = Jaktorowo; Kol = Kolmar; Lin = Lindenwerder; Mar = Margonin; Sam (S) = Samotschin (town); Sam (L) = Samotschin (rural area)
KM=www.KartenMeister.com entry; MQ=www.MapQuest.com map.
Note: Town name spelling varied, especially whether German names were one word or two; the letters "C" and "K", "I" and "J" were often swapped.
Population data may be inaccurate (see German census of 1895).
