= Żoń =

- Village
- Location within Poland
- Coordinates: 52°55′N 17°9′E
- Country: Poland
- Voivodeship: Greater Poland
- County: Chodzież
- Gmina: Margonin

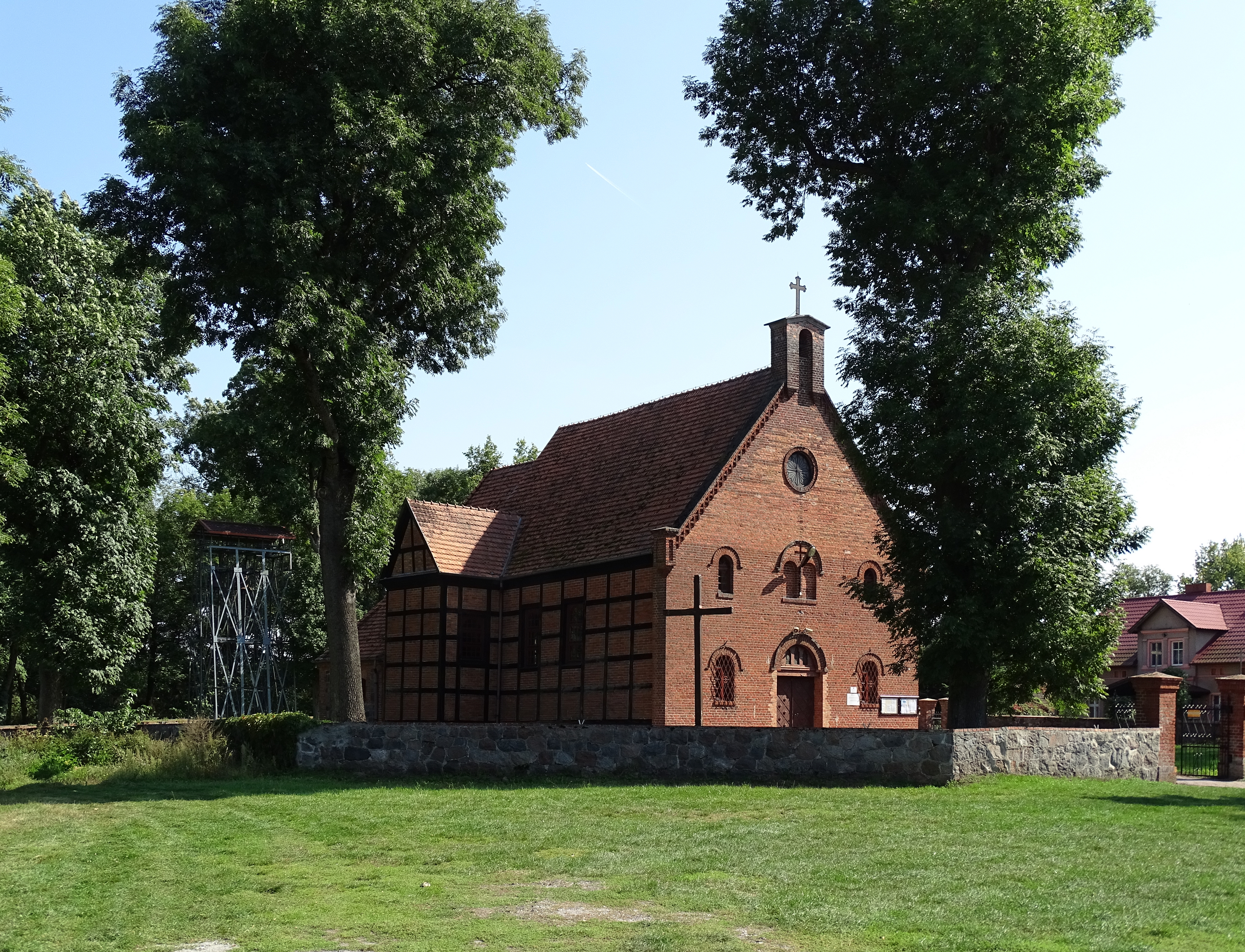
Church of St. Marcin

Żoń [ʐɔɲ] is a village in the administrative district of Gmina Margonin, within Chodzież County, Greater Poland Voivodeship, in west-central Poland.
