= Konstantynowo, Chodzież County =

Konstantynowo
- Village
- Location within Poland
- Coordinates: 53°0′45″N 17°1′31″E
- Country: Poland
- Voivodeship: Greater Poland
- County: Chodzież
- Gmina: Chodzież
- Population: 117

Konstantynowo [kɔnstantɨˈnɔvɔ] is a village in the administrative district of Gmina Chodzież, within Chodzież County, Greater Poland Voivodeship, in west-central Poland.
