= Stróżewo, Greater Poland Voivodeship =

Stróżewo
- Village
- Location within Poland
- Coordinates: 52°55′55″N 16°54′28″E
- Country: Poland
- Voivodeship: Greater Poland
- County: Chodzież
- Gmina: Chodzież
- Elevation: 90 m (300 ft)
- Population: 329

Stróżewo [struˈʐɛvɔ] (German: Kirchdorf) is a village in the administrative district of Gmina Chodzież, within Chodzież County, Greater Poland Voivodeship, in west-central Poland.
