= Lipia Góra, Greater Poland Voivodeship =

Lipia Góra
- Village
- Location within Poland
- Coordinates: 53°4′N 17°14′E
- Country: Poland
- Voivodeship: Greater Poland
- County: Chodzież
- Gmina: Szamocin
- Website: http://www.tplgio.prv.pl/

Lipia Góra [ˈlipja ˈɡura] is a village in the administrative district of Gmina Szamocin, within Chodzież County, Greater Poland Voivodeship, in west-central Poland.
