= Rudki, Chodzież County =

Rudki
- Village
- Location within Poland
- Coordinates: 52°59′49″N 16°59′15″E
- Country: Poland
- Voivodeship: Greater Poland
- County: Chodzież
- Gmina: Chodzież
- Population: 29

Rudki [ˈrutki] is a village in the administrative district of Gmina Chodzież, within Chodzież County, Greater Poland Voivodeship, in west-central Poland.
