= Krystynka =

- Village
- Location within Poland
- Coordinates: 52°56′19″N 16°55′36″E
- Country: Poland
- Voivodeship: Greater Poland
- County: Chodzież
- Gmina: Chodzież
- Population: 46

Krystynka [krɨsˈtɨnka] is a village in the administrative district of Gmina Chodzież, within Chodzież County, Greater Poland Voivodeship, in west-central Poland.
