= Raczyn, Greater Poland Voivodeship =

Raczyn
- Village
- Location within Poland
- Coordinates: 53°2′21″N 17°2′2″E
- Country: Poland
- Voivodeship: Greater Poland
- County: Chodzież
- Gmina: Szamocin
- Population: 130

Raczyn [ˈrat͡ʂɨn] is a village in the administrative district of Gmina Szamocin, within Chodzież County, Greater Poland Voivodeship, in west-central Poland.
