= Cisze =

- Village
- Location within Poland
- Coordinates: 52°59′36″N 16°48′32″E
- Country: Poland
- Voivodeship: Greater Poland
- County: Chodzież
- Gmina: Chodzież
- Population: 15

Cisze [ˈt͡ɕiʂɛ] is a village in the administrative district of Gmina Chodzież, within Chodzież County, Greater Poland Voivodeship, in west-central Poland.

The village had a population of 15 as of 2008.
