= Wyszynki =

- Village
- Location within Poland
- Coordinates: 52°53′N 16°48′E
- Country: Poland
- Voivodeship: Greater Poland
- County: Chodzież
- Gmina: Budzyń

Wyszynki [vɨˈʂɨnki] is a village in the administrative district of Gmina Budzyń, within Chodzież County, Greater Poland Voivodeship, in west-central Poland.
