= Dębiniec, Greater Poland Voivodeship =

Dębiniec
- Village
- Location within Poland
- Coordinates: 52°59′23″N 17°11′15″E
- Country: Poland
- Voivodeship: Greater Poland
- County: Chodzież
- Gmina: Margonin
- Population: 30

Dębiniec [dɛmˈbiɲɛt͡s] is a village in the administrative district of Gmina Margonin, within Chodzież County, Greater Poland Voivodeship, in west-central Poland.
