= Karolinka, Greater Poland Voivodeship =

Karolinka
- Settlement
- Location within Poland
- Coordinates: 52°59′47″N 17°09′13″E
- Country: Poland
- Voivodeship: Greater Poland
- County: Chodzież
- Gmina: Margonin

Karolinka [karɔˈlinka] is a settlement in the administrative district of Gmina Margonin, within Chodzież County, Greater Poland Voivodeship, in west-central Poland.
