= Mielimąka =

- Settlement
- Location within Poland
- Coordinates: 53°1′11″N 17°3′41″E
- Country: Poland
- Voivodeship: Greater Poland
- County: Chodzież
- Gmina: Szamocin

Mielimąka [mjɛliˈmɔnka] is a settlement in the administrative district of Gmina Szamocin, within Chodzież County, Greater Poland Voivodeship, in west-central Poland.
