= Popielno, Greater Poland Voivodeship =

Popielno
- Village
- Location within Poland
- Coordinates: 52°50′N 17°0′E
- Country: Poland
- Voivodeship: Greater Poland
- County: Chodzież
- Gmina: Budzyń

Popielno [pɔˈpjɛlnɔ] is a village in the administrative district of Gmina Budzyń, within Chodzież County, Greater Poland Voivodeship, in west-central Poland.
