= Tereska =

- Settlement
- Location within Poland
- Coordinates: 52°58′15″N 17°5′40″E
- Country: Poland
- Voivodeship: Greater Poland
- County: Chodzież
- Gmina: Margonin

Tereska [tɛˈrɛska] is a settlement in the administrative district of Gmina Margonin, within Chodzież County, Greater Poland Voivodeship, in west-central Poland.
