= Nietuszkowo =

- Village
- Location within Poland
- Coordinates: 53°2′6″N 16°49′45″E
- Country: Poland
- Voivodeship: Greater Poland
- County: Chodzież
- Gmina: Chodzież
- Population: 353
- Website: http://www.chodziez.gminarp.pl

Nietuszkowo [ɲɛtuʂˈkɔvɔ] is a village in the administrative district of Gmina Chodzież, within Chodzież County, Greater Poland Voivodeship, in west-central Poland.
