= Śluza-Krostkowo =

- Settlement
- Location within Poland
- Coordinates: 53°4′58″N 17°13′36″E
- Country: Poland
- Voivodeship: Greater Poland
- County: Chodzież
- Gmina: Szamocin

Śluza-Krostkowo [ˈɕluza krɔstˈkɔvɔ] is a settlement in the administrative district of Gmina Szamocin, within Chodzież County, Greater Poland Voivodeship, in west-central Poland.
