= Józefy, Greater Poland Voivodeship =

Józefy
- Village
- Location within Poland
- Coordinates: 53°02′09″N 17°16′40″E
- Country: Poland
- Voivodeship: Greater Poland
- County: Chodzież
- Gmina: Szamocin

Józefy [juˈzɛfɨ] is a village in the administrative district of Gmina Szamocin, within Chodzież County, Greater Poland Voivodeship, in west-central Poland.
