= Wyszyny =

- Village
- Location within Poland
- Coordinates: 52°53′N 16°51′E
- Country: Poland
- Voivodeship: Greater Poland
- County: Chodzież
- Gmina: Budzyń
- Population: 820

Wyszyny [vɨˈʂɨnɨ] is a village in the administrative district of Gmina Budzyń, within Chodzież County, Greater Poland Voivodeship, in west-central Poland.

It was the birthplace of the Wirydianna Fiszerowa, whose aunt Estera Raczyńska later owned the village and rebuilt a church there.
