= Adolfowo, Chodzież County =

Adolfowo
- Village
- Location within Poland
- Coordinates: 52°58′N 17°1′E
- Country: Poland
- Voivodeship: Greater Poland
- County: Chodzież
- Gmina: Margonin
- Population: 300

Adolfowo [adɔlˈfɔvɔ] is a village in the administrative district of Gmina Margonin, within Chodzież County, Greater Poland Voivodeship, in west-central Poland.
