= Lipiniec =

- Village
- Location within Poland
- Coordinates: 53°0′N 17°10′E
- Country: Poland
- Voivodeship: Greater Poland
- County: Chodzież
- Gmina: Margonin

Lipiniec [liˈpiɲɛt͡s] is a village in the administrative district of Gmina Margonin, within Chodzież County, Greater Poland Voivodeship, in west-central Poland.
