= Radosław Cierzniak =

Polish footballer (born 1983)

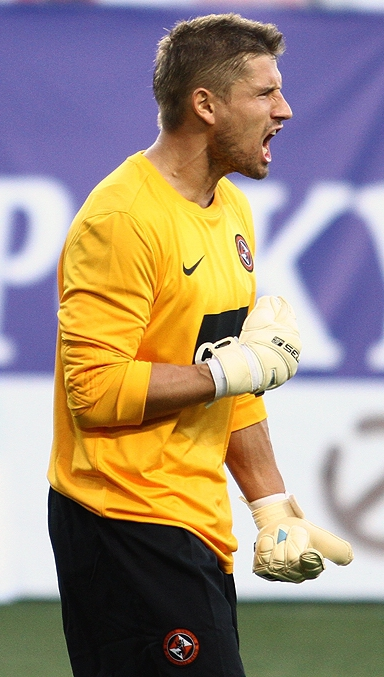
- Cierzniak playing for Dundee United in 2012

Personal information
- Full name: Radosław Jan Cierzniak
- Date of birth: 24 April 1983 (age 43)
- Place of birth: Szamocin, Poland
- Height: 1.87 m (6 ft 2 in)
- Position: Goalkeeper

Youth career
- Sokół Szamocin

Senior career*
Years	Team	Apps	(Gls)
2001	MSP Szamotuły		
2001	Lubuszanin Drezdenko		
2002	Obra Kościan		
2002	Sparta Oborniki		
2002	Volyn Lutsk	0	(0)
2002	Karpaty Lviv	0	(0)
2002	Karpaty-2 Lviv	6	(0)
2003	Stomil Olsztyn	13	(0)
2003–2004	Aluminium Konin	29	(0)
2004–2006	Amica Wronki	36	(0)
2006	Lech Poznań	0	(0)
2007–2010	Korona Kielce	57	(0)
2011	Alki Larnaca	21	(0)
2012	Cracovia	1	(0)
2012–2015	Dundee United	112	(0)
2015–2016	Wisła Kraków	21	(0)
2016–2021	Legia Warsaw	23	(0)
2016–2019	Legia Warsaw II	7	(0)

International career
2009	Poland	1	(0)
- * Club domestic league appearances and goals

Radosław Jan Cierzniak (Polish pronunciation: [raˈdɔswaf ˈtɕɛʐɲak]; born 24 April 1983) is a Polish former professional footballer who played as a goalkeeper.

== Club career ==
Born in Szamocin, Cierzniak started his career in the 2001–02 season. In 2002, he joined Volyn Lutsk on a one-year contract but lack of opportunities led him to returning to Poland by joining Stomil Olsztyn, where he made 13 appearances.

He then joined Aluminium Konin, where he became first choice goalkeeper and made 29 appearances. The club would finish in second place in the league. After 29 appearances at Aluminium Konin, he signed for Amica Wronki. He made his UEFA Cup debut against French side Auxerre, coming on as substitute for Arkadiusz Malarz after he had been injured, but only nine minutes later, Cierzniak was sent off for professional foul. On 20 April 2005, he made his league debut in a 2–2 draw against Odra Wodzisław. The following season, he became the first-choice goalkeeper for the club.

In 2006 Amica Wronki merged with Lech Poznan. Cierzniak made his Lech Poznán debut in the UEFA Intertoto Cup in a 3–1 loss against Tiraspol on 8 July 2006. However, he rarely featured in the first team as Krzysztof Kotorowski took the goalkeeping position. After six months at Lech Poznań, he joined Korona Kielce. On 28 April 2007, he made his debut in a 1–0 loss against Odra Wodzisław. Three season later, Cierzniak lost his first team place to Zbigniew Małkowski, which resulted in him leaving the club when his contract expired on 31 December 2010.

On 12 January 2011, he signed a one-year contract with Cypriot club Alki Larnaca. By the end of the season, he had made 21 appearances.

Cierzniak agreed a two-year contract with Scottish Premier League club Dundee United in February 2012, due to start in the summer. He joined KS Cracovia in his homeland on a three-month deal in preparation for his move to Dundee United. Cierzniak made his debut for Cracovia on 23 March 2012 in a 3–1 loss against Górnik Zabrze. On 2 August 2012, Cierzniak made his debut for Dundee United, in the third qualifying round of the UEFA Europa League as United drew 2–2 draw against Russian team Dynamo Moscow However, Dynamo Moscow would thrash Dundee United 5–0 in the second leg, eliminating the club from the Europa League. On 5 August 2012, he made his league debut in a 3–0 win over Hibernian, where he got his first clean sheet. In the next league match, a derby against Dundee, which Dundee United won 3–0, he made a double save from Nicky Riley to prevent Dundee taking an early lead. After the match, teammate Willo Flood praised Cierzniak's performance. Cierzniak said he was delighted to have experienced his first ever derby. Having been established as the club's first choice goalkeeper throughout the season, on 6 March 2013, Cierzniak signed a new contract at Dundee United, keeping him at the club until May 2015. Upon signing the new contract, United Manager Jackie McNamara said on the club's website: "This extension is merited because Rado has shown that he is an excellent SPL goalkeeper."

== International career ==
Cierzniak debuted for the Poland national team in a friendly versus Lithuania in February 2009.

== Honours ==
Legia Warsaw

- Ekstraklasa: 2016–17, 2017–18, 2019–20, 2020–21
- Polish Cup: 2017–18

Individual

- Ekstraklasa Save of the Season: 2015–16
