= Strzelęcin =

- Village
- Location within Poland
- Coordinates: 53°1′6″N 16°56′46″E
- Country: Poland
- Voivodeship: Greater Poland
- County: Chodzież
- Gmina: Chodzież
- Population: 97

Strzelęcin [stʂɛˈlɛnt͡ɕin] (German: Neu Strelitz) is a village in the administrative district of Gmina Chodzież, within Chodzież County, Greater Poland Voivodeship, in west-central Poland.
