= Józefowo, Chodzież County =

Józefowo
- Settlement
- Location within Poland
- Coordinates: 53°2′9″N 17°16′38″E
- Country: Poland
- Voivodeship: Greater Poland
- County: Chodzież
- Gmina: Szamocin

Józefowo (Polish: [juzɛˈfɔvɔ]; German: Josephowo, 1939–45 Josefshof) is a settlement in the administrative district of Gmina Szamocin, within Chodzież County, Greater Poland Voivodeship, in west-central Poland.
