= Mirowo, Greater Poland Voivodeship =

Mirowo
- Village
- Location within Poland
- Coordinates: 53°0′22″N 17°1′10″E
- Country: Poland
- Voivodeship: Greater Poland
- County: Chodzież
- Gmina: Chodzież
- Population: 54

Mirowo [miˈrɔvɔ] is a village in the administrative district of Gmina Chodzież, within Chodzież County, Greater Poland Voivodeship, in west-central Poland.
