= Borowo, Chodzież County =

Borowo
- Village
- Location within Poland
- Coordinates: 53°3′N 17°12′E
- Country: Poland
- Voivodeship: Greater Poland
- County: Chodzież
- Gmina: Szamocin

Borowo [bɔˈrɔvɔ] is a village in the administrative district of Gmina Szamocin, within Chodzież County, Greater Poland Voivodeship, in west-central Poland.
