= Bukowiec, Chodzież County =

Bukowiec
- Village
- Location within Poland
- Coordinates: 52°51′41″N 16°52′12″E
- Country: Poland
- Voivodeship: Greater Poland
- County: Chodzież
- Gmina: Budzyń

Bukowiec [buˈkɔvjɛt͡s] is a village in the administrative district of Gmina Budzyń, within Chodzież County, Greater Poland Voivodeship, in west-central Poland.
