= Lipiny, Chodzież County =

Lipiny
- Village
- Location within Poland
- Coordinates: 52°58′16″N 17°10′47″E
- Country: Poland
- Voivodeship: Greater Poland
- County: Chodzież
- Gmina: Margonin

Lipiny [liˈpinɨ] is a village in the administrative district of Gmina Margonin, within Chodzież County, Greater Poland Voivodeship, in west-central Poland.
