= Gmina Szamocin =

Gmina Szamocin Szamocin Commune
- Gmina
- Coat of arms
- Interactive map of Gmina Szamocin
- Coordinates (Szamocin): 53°1′49″N 17°7′14″E
- Country: Poland
- Voivodeship: Greater Poland
- County: Chodzież
- Seat: Szamocin

Area
  - Total: 125.46 km^{2} (48.44 sq mi)

Population (2006)
  - Total: 7,292
  - Density: 58.12/km^{2} (150.5/sq mi)
  - Urban: 4,267
  - Rural: 3,025
- Website: https://www.gminaszamocin.pl/

Gmina Szamocin is an urban-rural gmina (administrative district) in Chodzież County, Greater Poland Voivodeship, in west-central Poland. Its seat is the town of Szamocin, which lies approximately 16 kilometres (10 mi) east of Chodzież and 72 km (45 mi) north of the regional capital Poznań.

The gmina covers an area of 125.46 square kilometres (48.4 sq mi), and as of 2006 its total population is 7,292 (out of which the population of Szamocin amounts to 4,267, and the population of the rural part of the gmina is 3,025).

== Villages ==
Apart from the town of Szamocin, Gmina Szamocin contains the villages and settlements of Antoniny, Atanazyn, Borówki, Borowo, Heliodorowo, Jaktorówko, Jaktorowo, Józefowice, Józefowo, Józefy, Kosarzyn, Laskowo, Leśniczówka, Lipa, Lipia Góra, Mielimąka, Nadolnik, Nałęcza, Nowy Dwór, Nowy Młyn, Piłka, Raczyn, Śluza-Krostkowo, Sokolec, Strzelczyki, Swoboda, Szamoty and Weśrednik.

== Neighbouring gminas ==
Gmina Szamocin is bordered by the gminas of Białośliwie, Chodzież, Gołańcz, Margonin, Miasteczko Krajeńskie and Wyrzysk.
