= Oleśnica, Chodzież County =

Oleśnica
- Village
- Location within Poland
- Coordinates: 52°59′40″N 16°51′3″E
- Country: Poland
- Voivodeship: Greater Poland
- County: Chodzież
- Gmina: Chodzież
- Population: 357

Oleśnica (Polish: [ɔlɛˈɕɲit͡sa]) is a village in the administrative district of Gmina Chodzież, within Chodzież County, Greater Poland Voivodeship, in west-central Poland.

== People ==
- Otto von Königsmarck (1815-1889), German landowner and politician
