= Marcinek, Greater Poland Voivodeship =

Marcinek
- Settlement
- Location within Poland
- Coordinates: 52°59′44″N 17°03′59″E
- Country: Poland
- Voivodeship: Greater Poland
- County: Chodzież
- Gmina: Margonin

Marcinek [marˈt͡ɕinɛk] is a settlement in the administrative district of Gmina Margonin, within Chodzież County, Greater Poland Voivodeship, in west-central Poland.
