= Grabówka, Greater Poland Voivodeship =

Grabówka
- Village
- Location within Poland
- Coordinates: 52°55′N 16°52′E
- Country: Poland
- Voivodeship: Greater Poland
- County: Chodzież
- Gmina: Budzyń

Grabówka [ɡraˈbufka] is a village in the administrative district of Gmina Budzyń, within Chodzież County, Greater Poland Voivodeship, in west-central Poland.
