= Heinz Seelig =

Heinz Seelig היינץ זליג
- Born: February 26, 1909; Samotschin, Kingdom of Prussia
- Died: December 12, 1992 (aged 83); Haifa, Israel
- Known for: Interior Architecture, Painting
- Movement: Bauhaus, Naive Art

Heinz Seelig (Hebrew: היינץ זליג; February 26, 1909 – December 25, 1992) was a German-born, Israeli interior architect known for his pioneering work in interior design, and later for his Biblically inspired paintings as well as the Seelig Art Haggadah.

== Biography ==
Heinz Seelig was born in the Prussian city of Samotschin in 1909, and grew up in Berlin. He began drawing early in life, publishing cartoons in Berlin newspapers at the age of 15.

Seelig received his professional education at the legendary Bauhaus in Dessau, and graduated as an interior architect from the School of Free and Applied Arts in Berlin in 1929. With Hitler’s assumption of power in 1933, Seelig fled Nazi Germany for Mandatory Palestine.

Seelig was a member of the Haganah (the Jewish defence forces in British Mandatory Palestine) and later fought in the 1948 Arab–Israeli War.

== Interior design career ==
In Israel, Seelig was a pioneer in the new profession of interior architecture. His many projects included restaurants (e.g. Rishon Cellar in Tel Aviv), stores (e.g. the first Kapulsky Conditoria in Tel Aviv), hotels (e.g. The President’s Hotel in Jerusalem, Megiddo Hotel in Haifa, Zion Hotel in Haifa), banks and private homes throughout Israel, as well as extensive work for public agencies including the municipality of Haifa (e.g. the Jewish Arab Centre) and the Israel Defense Forces.

In 1936, Seelig established one of the first interior design practices in Israel, and in 1939, he moved his office from Tel Aviv to Haifa, where he practiced until 1974.

== Artistic career ==
Upon retiring from his architectural practice, Seelig launched his second career as a painter, inspired primarily by scenes from the Hebrew Bible. While Seelig’s art is often described as naive art, his work is distinguished by its use of three-dimensional perspective, influenced by his architectural background. His paintings are further characterized by the use of hundreds of dots to create backgrounds for his subjects.

Seelig had his first solo exhibition at the Georgian Galleries in Vancouver in 1975 and in the same year won the second prize in the prestigious international competition for naïve art held by the Gallerie Pro Arte Kasper in Switzerland.

Seelig's major shows included the Goldman Art Gallery in Haifa; the Israel Art Festival in Ottawa, Ontario, Canada; Kawede Gallery, Berlin; Art Expo, New York; the New Gallery, Haifa; the Ida Kimche Gallery, Tel Aviv; a traveling exhibition in six museums in South Africa; Paperworks Gallery, Vancouver, British Columbia, Canada; North Shore Congregation Israel, Chicago; the National Museum of New Zealand.

Seelig created more than 50 lithographs, including his series of The Book of Esther, The Story of Paradise and The Seven Days of Creation. Sets of the latter series are in the collections of President Jimmy Carter and the late President Anwar Sadat (presented to both leaders following the Camp David Peace Accords).

In 1982, the book Beginnings based on Seelig’s art was published by Multnomah Press of Portland, Oregon. In the same year, he was commissioned to design two stained glass windows, each ten feet in diameter, for the North Shore Congregation in Chicago.

In 1988, Seelig’s first Passover Haggadah was published by Palphot in Israel. His second Haggadah (The Seelig Art Haggadah) was published in a bilingual Hebrew-English edition.
