= Piłka, Chodzież County =

Piłka
- Settlement
- Location within Poland
- Coordinates: 53°0′11″N 17°3′2″E
- Country: Poland
- Voivodeship: Greater Poland
- County: Chodzież
- Gmina: Szamocin

Piłka [ˈpiu̯ka] is a settlement in the administrative district of Gmina Szamocin, within Chodzież County, Greater Poland Voivodeship, in west-central Poland.
