= Gmina Chodzież =

Gmina Chodzież Chodzież Commune
- Gmina
- Coat of arms
- Interactive map of Gmina Chodzież
- Coordinates (Chodzież): 52°59′N 16°54′E
- Country: Poland
- Voivodeship: Greater Poland
- County: Chodzież
- Seat: Chodzież

Area
  - Total: 212.74 km^{2} (82.14 sq mi)

Population (2006)
  - Total: 5,407
  - Density: 25.42/km^{2} (65.83/sq mi)
- Website: https://www.gminachodziez.pl/

Gmina Chodzież is a rural gmina (administrative district) in Chodzież County, Greater Poland Voivodeship, in west-central Poland. Its seat is the town of Chodzież, although the town is not part of the territory of the gmina.

The gmina covers an area of 212.74 square kilometres (82.1 sq mi), and as of 2006 its total population is 5,407.

== Villages ==
Gmina Chodzież contains the villages and settlements of Cisze, Ciszewo, Drzązgowo, Jacewko, Kamionka, Kierzkowice, Konstantynowo, Krystynka, Milcz, Mirowo, Nietuszkowo, Oleśnica, Pietronki, Podanin, Rataje, Rudki, Słomki, Stróżewice, Stróżewko, Stróżewo, Strzelce, Strzelęcin, Studzieniec, Trojanka, Trzaskowice, Wymysław and Zacharzyn.

== Neighbouring gminas ==
Gmina Chodzież is bordered by the town of Chodzież and by the gminas of Budzyń, Czarnków, Kaczory, Margonin, Miasteczko Krajeńskie, Szamocin and Ujście.
