= Kąkolewice, Greater Poland Voivodeship =

Kąkolewice
- Village
- Location within Poland
- Coordinates: 52°55′N 16°58′E
- Country: Poland
- Voivodeship: Greater Poland
- County: Chodzież
- Gmina: Budzyń

Kąkolewice [kɔnkɔlɛˈvit͡sɛ]) is a village in the administrative district of Gmina Budzyń, within Chodzież County, Greater Poland Voivodeship, in west-central Poland.
