= Klotyldzin =

- Settlement
- Location within Poland
- Coordinates: 52°57′N 17°4′E
- Country: Poland
- Voivodeship: Greater Poland
- County: Chodzież
- Gmina: Margonin

Klotyldzin [klɔˈtɨld͡ʑin] is a settlement in the administrative district of Gmina Margonin, within Chodzież County, Greater Poland Voivodeship, in west-central Poland.
