= Sokołowo Budzyńskie =

- Village
- Location within Poland
- Coordinates: 52°51′N 16°56′E
- Country: Poland
- Voivodeship: Greater Poland
- County: Chodzież
- Gmina: Budzyń

Sokołowo Budzyńskie [sɔkɔˈwɔvɔ buˈd͡zɨɲskʲɛ] is a village in the administrative district of Gmina Budzyń, within Chodzież County, Greater Poland Voivodeship, in west-central Poland.

== See also ==
- Sokołowo, for other villages
