= Nowy Młyn, Chodzież County =

Nowy Młyn
- Village
- Location within Poland
- Coordinates: 53°00′07″N 17°03′28″E
- Country: Poland
- Voivodeship: Greater Poland
- County: Chodzież
- Gmina: Szamocin

Nowy Młyn [ˈnɔvɨ ˈmwɨn] is a village in the administrative district of Gmina Szamocin, within Chodzież County, Greater Poland Voivodeship, in west-central Poland.
