= Laskowo, Chodzież County =

Laskowo
- Village
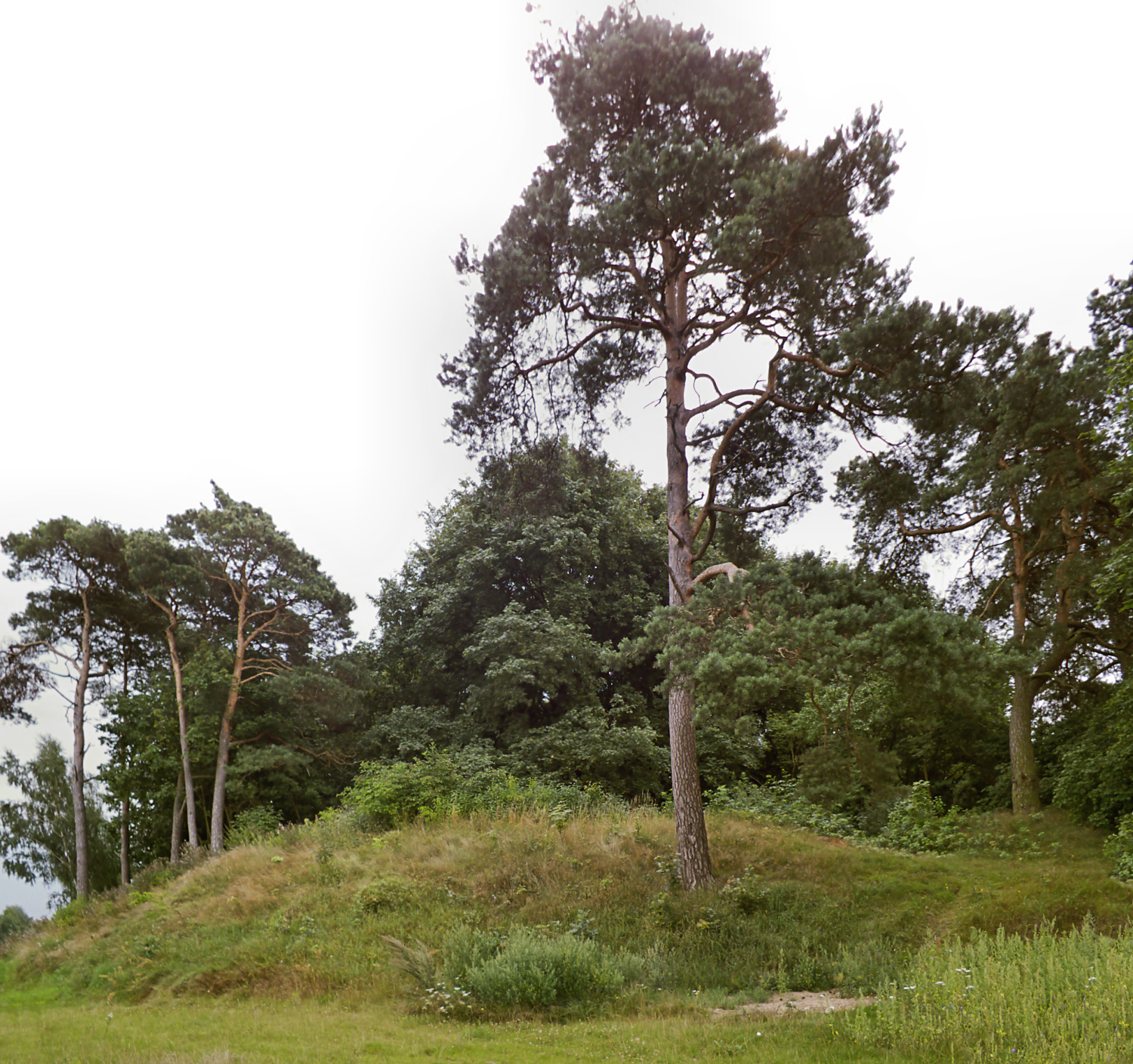

- Location within Poland
- Coordinates: 53°2′N 17°6′E
- Country: Poland
- Voivodeship: Greater Poland
- County: Chodzież
- Gmina: Szamocin
- Time zone: UTC+1 (CET)
  - Summer (DST): UTC+2 (CEST)
- Vehicle registration: PCH

Laskowo ([lasˈkɔvɔ]; German: Seefeld) is a village in the administrative district of Gmina Szamocin, within Chodzież County, Greater Poland Voivodeship, in west-central Poland.
