= Gmina Budzyń =

Gmina Budzyń Budzyń Commune
- Gmina
- Flag Coat of arms
- Interactive map of Gmina Budzyń
- Coordinates (Budzyń): 52°53′22″N 16°59′19″E
- Country: Poland
- Voivodeship: Greater Poland
- County: Chodzież
- Seat: Budzyń

Area
  - Total: 209.09 km^{2} (80.73 sq mi)

Population (2020)
  - Total: 8,492
  - Density: 40.61/km^{2} (105.2/sq mi)
- Website: http://www.budzyn.pl/

Gmina Budzyń is an urban-rural gmina (administrative district) in Chodzież County, Greater Poland Voivodeship, in west-central Poland. Its seat is the town of Budzyń, which lies approximately 12 kilometres (7 mi) south-east of Chodzież and 55 km (34 mi) north of the regional capital Poznań.

The gmina covers an area of 209.09 square kilometres (80.7 sq mi), and as of 2006 its total population is 8,492.

== Villages ==
Gmina Budzyń contains the villages and settlements of Brzekiniec, Bukowiec, Dziewoklucz, Grabówka, Kąkolewice, Niewiemko, Nowawieś Wyszyńska, Nowe Brzeźno, Ostrówki, Podstolice, Popielno, Prosna, Sokołowo Budzyńskie, Wyszynki and Wyszyny.

== Neighbouring gminas ==
Gmina Budzyń is bordered by the gminas of Chodzież, Czarnków, Margonin, Rogoźno, Ryczywół and Wągrowiec.
