= Samuel Seligsohn =

- Born: 1814; Szamocin, Posen
- Died: 3 October 1866 (aged 50–51); Szamocin, Posen
- Occupation: Poet
- Writing career
- Language: Hebrew

Samuel Seligsohn (Yiddish: שמואל זונוויל זעליגזאָהן; 23 December 1814 – 3 October 1866) was a Prussian Hebrew poet, who published the epos Ha-Aviv (Berlin, 1845). Another epos, on the destruction of Jerusalem, and various essays by him remained in manuscript.

== Publications ==
- Seligsohn, Samuel (1845). Ha-Aviv. Berlin: Julius Sittenfeld.
