= Borówki, Greater Poland Voivodeship =

Borówki
- Village
- Location within Poland
- Coordinates: 53°2′43″N 17°10′11″E
- Country: Poland
- Voivodeship: Greater Poland
- County: Chodzież
- Gmina: Szamocin

Borówki [bɔˈrufki] is a village in the administrative district of Gmina Szamocin, within Chodzież County, Greater Poland Voivodeship, in west-central Poland.
