= Standesamt Podanin =

Standesamt Podanin was a civil registration district (Standesamt) located in Kreis Kolmar, province of Posen of the German Empire (1871–1918) and administered the communities of:

Community	Polish name	Type	1895 Pop	Prot	Cath	Jew	Civil Ofc	Police Ofc	Court Ofc	Cath. Ch	Prot. Ch	Notes	More
Podanin		Village	451	331	120		Pod	Kol	Kol	Kol	Kol
Adolphsheim		Village	94	70	24		Pod	Kol	Kol	Kol	Kol
Christinchen		Village	45	44	1		Pod	Kol	Kol	Kol	Kol
Deutschendorf, F		Estate	20	13	7		Pod	Kol	Kol	Kol	Bud
Knarrhütte		Village	92	80	12		Pod	Bud	Kol	Kol	Kol
Podanin, OF		Estate	84	66	18		Pod	Kol	Kol	Kol	Kol
Strosewo		Village	267	252	15		Pod	Kol	Kol	Kol	Kol
Strosewo Hauland		Village	660	609	51		Pod	Kol	Kol	Kol	Kol

Bud = Budsin; Kol = Kolmar; Pod = Podanin
F = forester; OF = head forester
Accuracy of population data is suspect.
