= Sokolec, Greater Poland Voivodeship =

Sokolec
- Village
- Location within Poland
- Coordinates: 53°4′N 17°14′E
- Country: Poland
- Voivodeship: Greater Poland
- County: Chodzież
- Gmina: Szamocin

Sokolec [sɔˈkɔlɛt͡s] is a village in the administrative district of Gmina Szamocin, within Chodzież County, Greater Poland Voivodeship, in west-central Poland.
