= Szamocin =

Town in Greater Poland Voivodeship, Poland

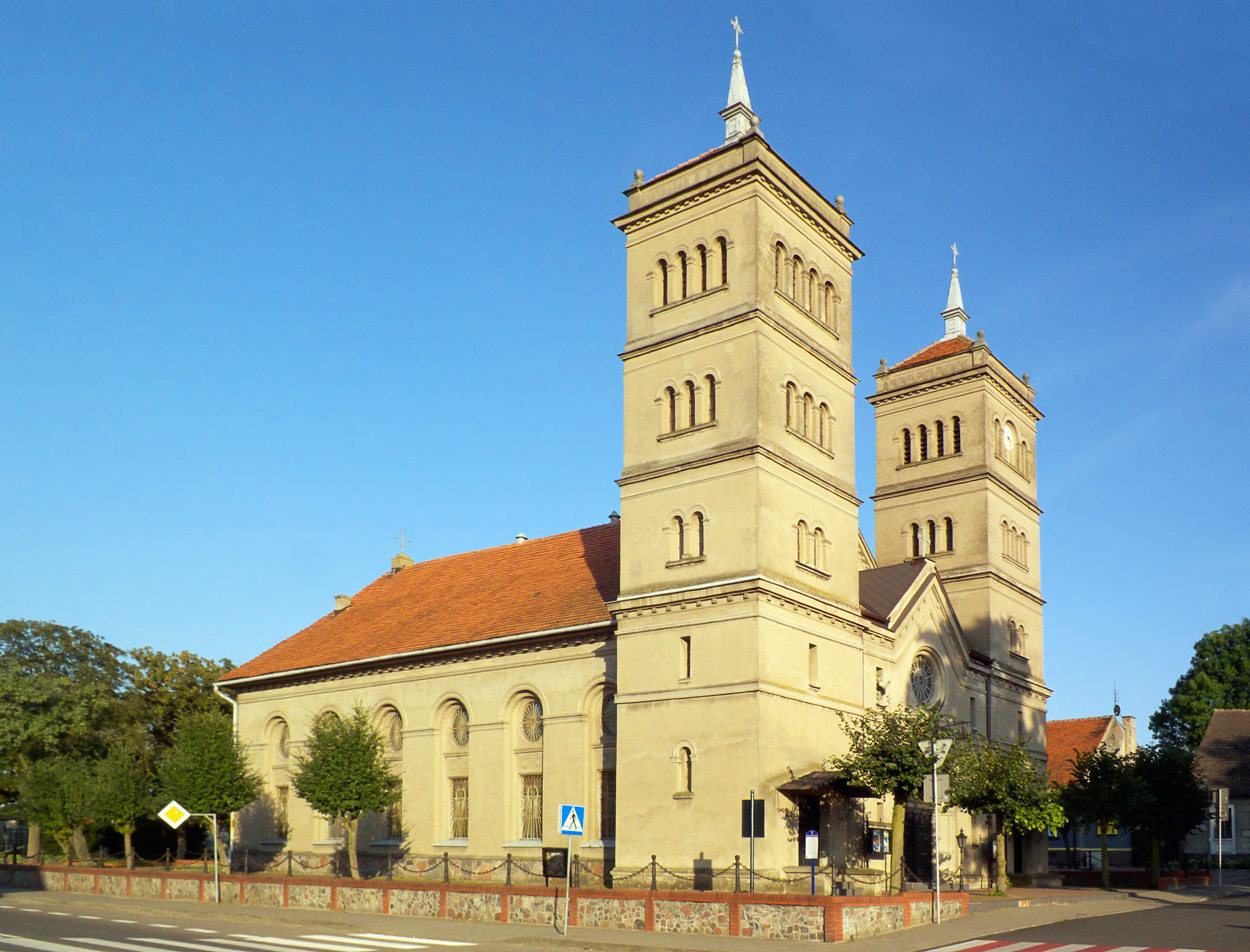
- Church of Saints Peter and Paul

- Coat of arms

- Location within Poland
- Coordinates: 53°1′49″N 17°7′14″E
- Country: Poland
- Voivodeship: Greater Poland
- County: Chodzież
- Gmina: Szamocin
- First mentioned: 1364
- Town rights: 1748

Government
  - Mayor: Eugeniusz Wiktor Kucner

Area
  - Total: 4.67 km^{2} (1.80 sq mi)

Population (2010)
  - Total: 4,291
  - Density: 919/km^{2} (2,380/sq mi)
- Time zone: UTC+1 (CET)
  - Summer (DST): UTC+2 (CEST)
- Postal code: 64-820
- Area code: +48 67
- Vehicle registration: PCH
- Website: http://www.szamocin24.pl

Szamocin [ʂaˈmɔt͡ɕin] is a town in Chodzież County, Greater Poland Voivodeship, Poland.

== History ==
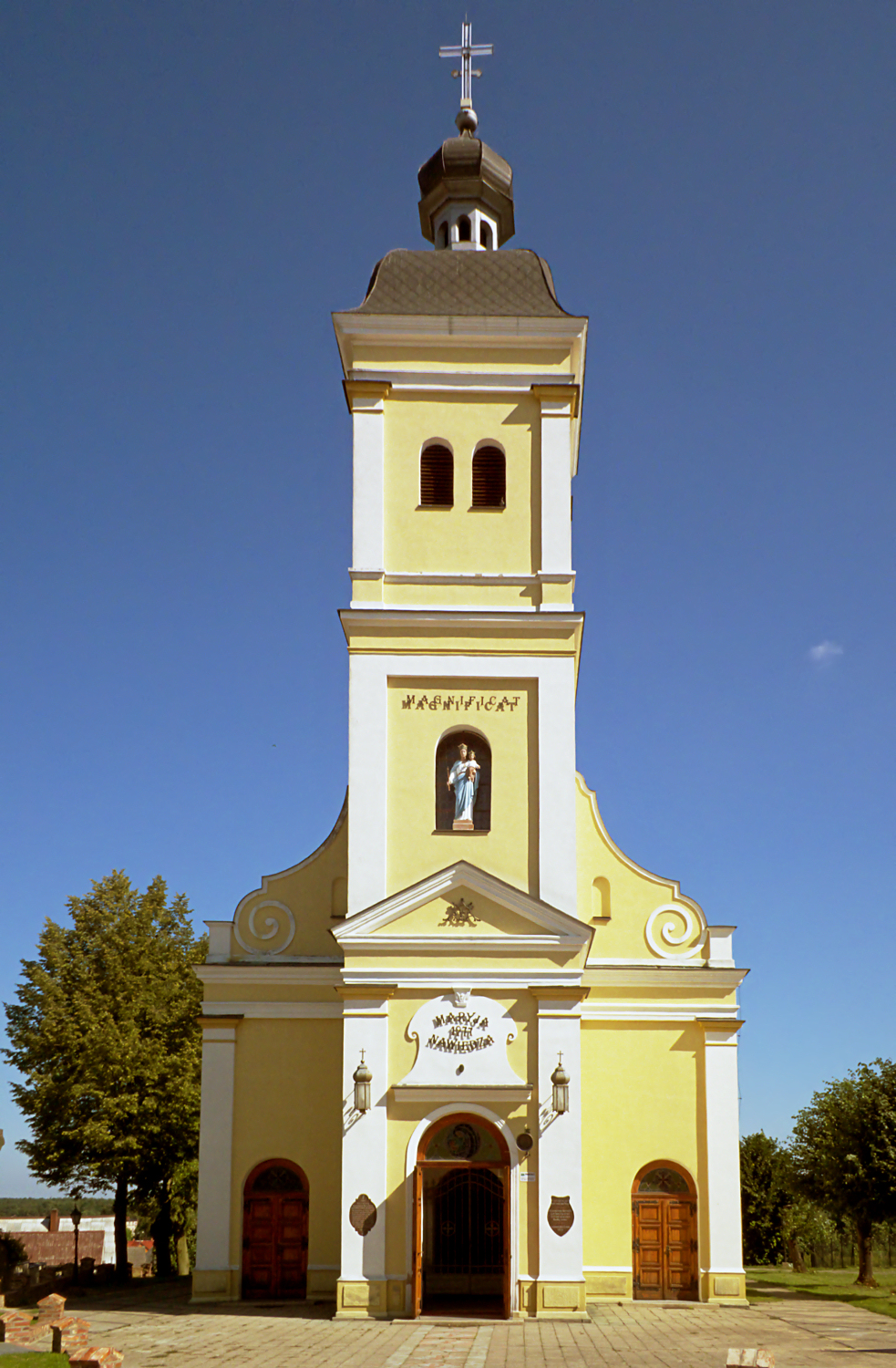
Church of the Blessed Virgin Mary Help of Christians

Szamoczino in the Piast-ruled Kingdom of Poland was first mentioned in a 1364 deed, although it surely existed earlier and was probably founded in the 12th century. It was a private village of Polish nobility, administratively located in the Kcynia County in the Kalisz Voivodeship in the Greater Poland Province. It received town privileges from the hands of King Augustus III of Poland in 1748.

In the First partition of Poland in 1772 the town was annexed by the Kingdom of Prussia. After the successful Greater Poland uprising of 1806, it was regained by Poles and included within the short-lived Duchy of Warsaw. It was re-annexed by Prussia in 1815, whereafter it was governed within the Kreis Kolmar in Posen, part of the Grand Duchy of Posen. During the Industrial Revolution, the town evolved to a centre of the weaving industry. From 1871 it was part of Germany. After World War I, in 1918, Poland regained independence, and the Greater Poland Uprising broke out, which goal was to reintegrate the region with the reborn Polish state. On January 13, 1919, the town was captured by Polish insurgents led by Maksymilian Bartsch, but was lost to Germany on the same day. The insurgents made an unsuccessful attempt to recapture the town, however in accordance to the Treaty of Versailles it was still reintegrated with the newly established Second Polish Republic in 1921.

After the joint German-Soviet invasion of Poland, which started World War II, in September 1939, it was captured by Germany, and already on September 17, the Germans murdered two Polish boy scouts in the town. Inhabitants of Szamocin were also among 41 Poles murdered in the nearby village of Morzewo on November 7, 1939. On December 10–12, 1939, the Germans expelled hundreds of Polish and Jewish inhabitants from the town to the General Government. The local Polish police chief and another Polish policeman from Szamocin were murdered by the Russians in the Katyn massacre in 1940. In 1943, the German administration renamed the town Fritzenstadt, to erase traces of Polish origin. After the German occupation ended in 1945, the original Polish name was restored.

== Demographics ==
Historical population

Year	Pop.	±%
1871	2,122	—
1880	2,167	+2.1%
1890	2,029	−6.4%
1900	1,967	−3.1%
1910	1,971	+0.2%
1921	1,548	−21.5%

Year	Pop.	±%
1931	1,937	+25.1%
1939	2,100	+8.4%
1950	2,325	+10.7%
1960	2,769	+19.1%
2010	4,291	+55.0%

== Sports ==
The local football club is Sokół Szamocin. It competes in the lower leagues.

== Notable people ==
- Samuel Seligsohn (1814–1866), poet
- Ernst Toller (1893–1939), playwright
- Heinz Seelig (1909–1992), Israeli architect
- Adam Szejnfeld (born 1958), politician; councillor and Mayor of Szamocin 1990–1998
- Bartosz Ślusarski (born 1981), footballer
- Radosław Cierzniak (born 1983), footballer

== International relations ==
=== Twin towns — Sister cities ===
Szamocin is twinned with:

- Grasberg, Germany
