= Bugaj, Chodzież County =

Bugaj
- Settlement
- Location within Poland
- Coordinates: 52°56′N 17°10′E
- Country: Poland
- Voivodeship: Greater Poland
- County: Chodzież
- Gmina: Margonin

Bugaj [ˈbuɡai̯] is a settlement in the administrative district of Gmina Margonin, within Chodzież County, Greater Poland Voivodeship, in west-central Poland.
