= Dziembowo =

- Village
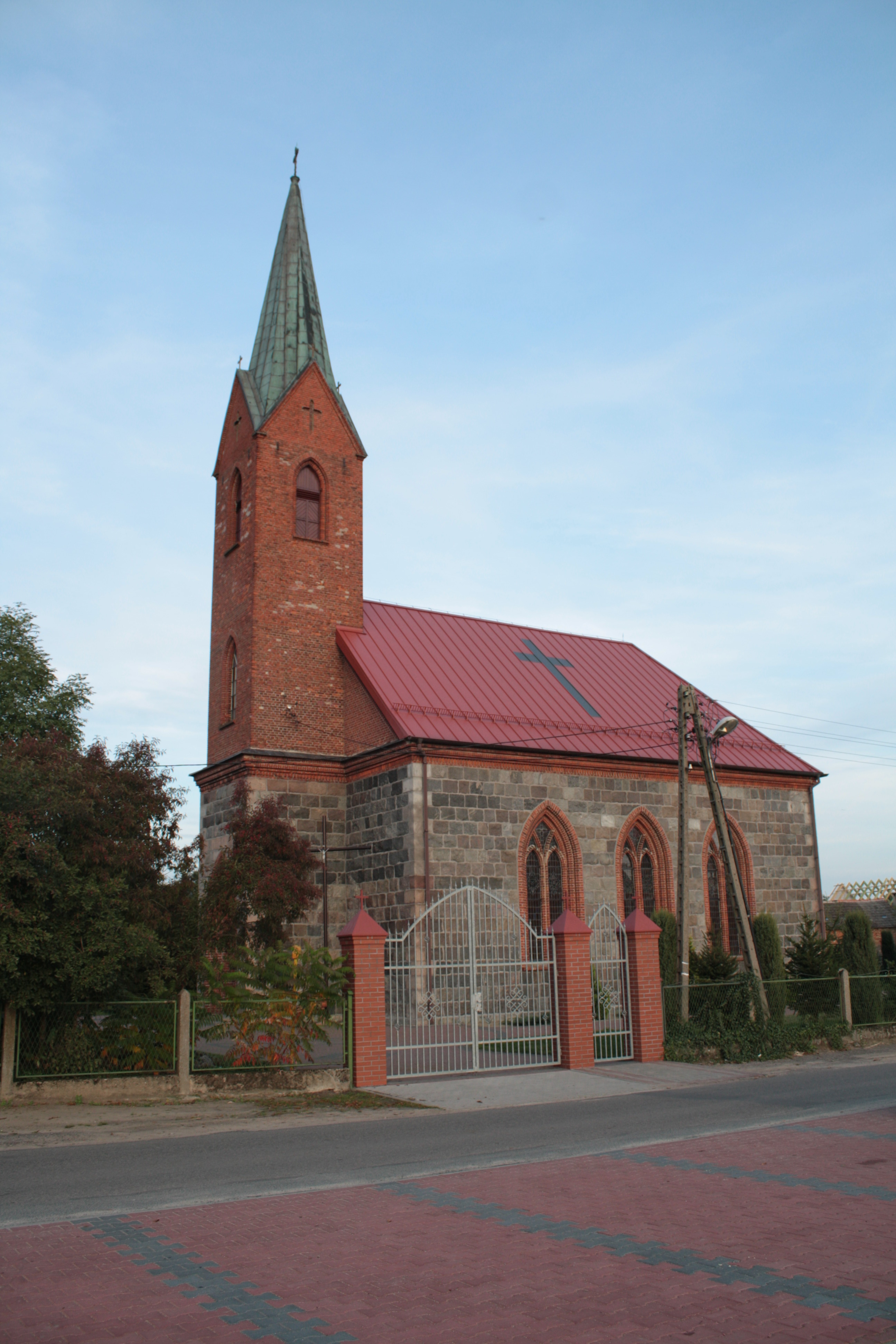
- Church of Saints Peter and Paul

- Location within Poland
- Coordinates: 53°5′N 16°50′E
- Country: Poland
- Voivodeship: Greater Poland
- County: Piła
- Gmina: Kaczory
- Website: http://www.dziembowo.republika.pl

Dziembowo [d͡ʑɛmˈbɔvɔ] is a village in the administrative district of Gmina Kaczory, within Piła County, Greater Poland Voivodeship, in west-central Poland.
