= Margonin =

Town in Chodziez County, Poland

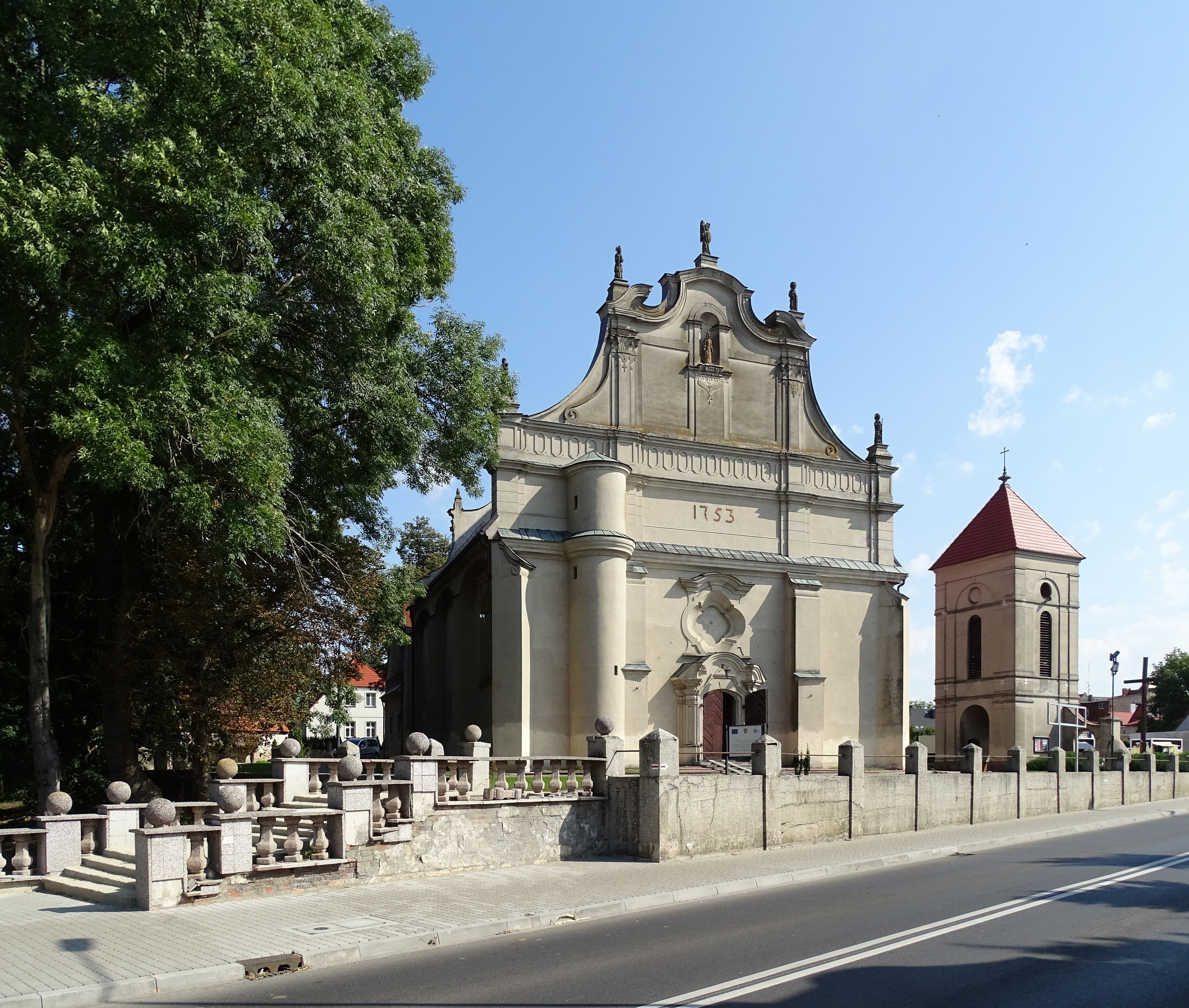
- St. Adalbert Church

- Flag Coat of arms

- Location within Poland
- Coordinates: 52°58′N 17°5′E
- Country: Poland
- Voivodeship: Greater Poland
- County: Chodzież
- Gmina: Margonin
- Established: 7th century
- First mentioned: 1364
- Town rights: 1402

Area
  - Total: 5.15 km^{2} (1.99 sq mi)

Population (2016)
  - Total: 3,022
  - Density: 587/km^{2} (1,520/sq mi)
- Time zone: UTC+1 (CET)
  - Summer (DST): UTC+2 (CEST)
- Postal code: 64-830
- Vehicle registration: PCH
- Website: http://www.margonin.pl

Margonin [marˈɡɔɲin] is a town in Chodzież County, Greater Poland Voivodeship, Poland, with 3,022 inhabitants (2016).

== History ==
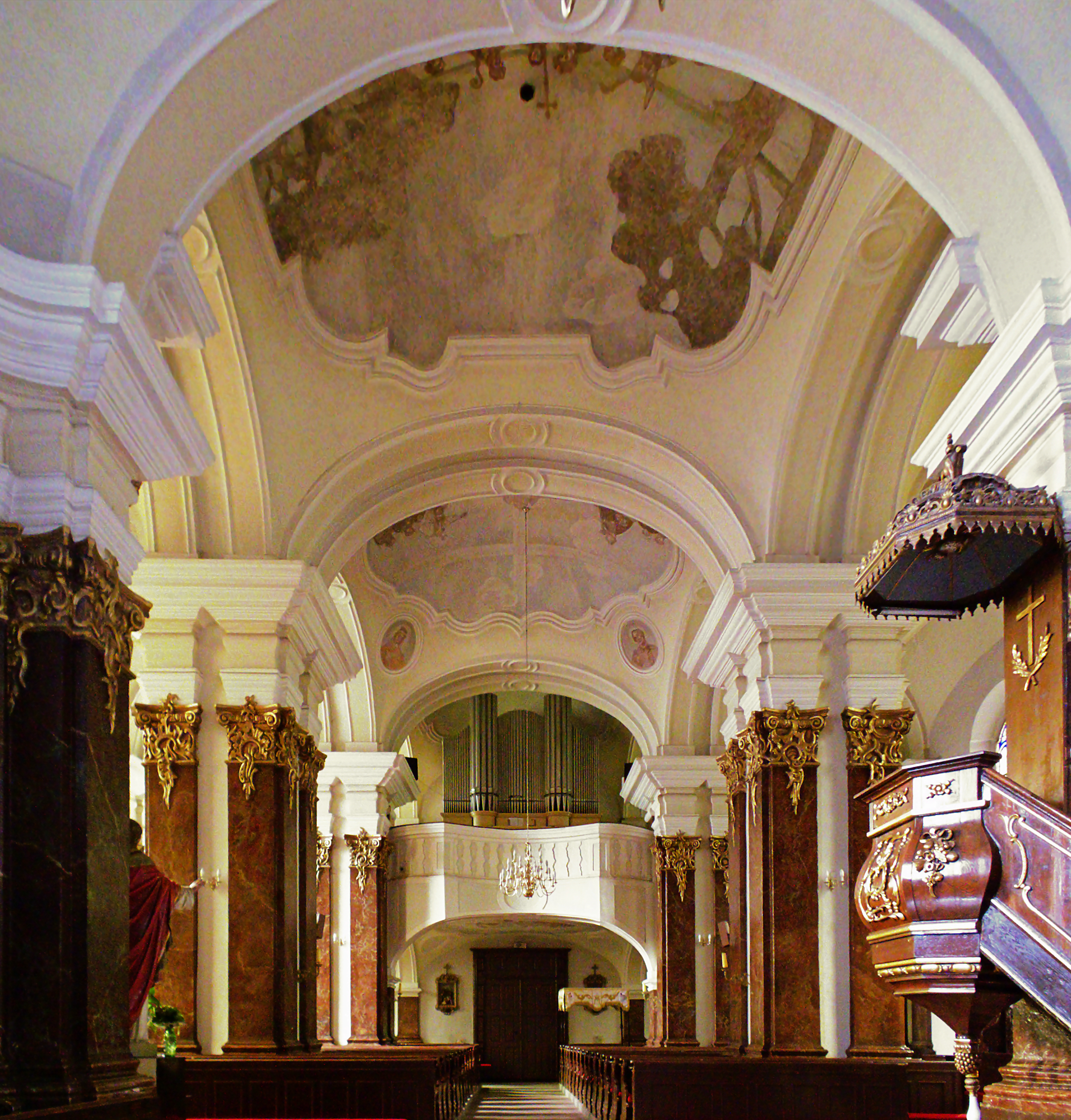
Interior of the Baroque St. Adalbert Church

Margonin dates back to the 7th century, and in the 9th–12th it was a defensive stronghold, which became part of Poland after the establishment of the state in the 10th century. Margonin was first mentioned when Archbishop Jarosław Bogoria of Skotniki of Gniezno and the Bishop of Poznań, Jan Doliwa, agreed on 15 May 1364 that Margonin parish should belong to the Diocese of Poznań. Town rights were received in 1402. Margonin was a private town of Polish nobility, administratively located in the Kcynia County in the Kalisz Voivodeship in the Greater Poland Province. Much of the town was destroyed in 1655 during the Swedish invasion of Poland (Deluge), and the town lost its rights. They were restored on 20 July 1696. An orphanage was established in 1725. The Catholic Church was heavily damaged by a storm in 1737, and was repaired between 1753 and 1755.

As a result of the First Partition of Poland, in 1772, it was annexed by Prussia. Polish jurist, poet, political and military activist Józef Wybicki, best known as the author of the lyrics of the national anthem of Poland, married Kunegunda Drwęska in Margonin in 1773. After the successful Greater Poland uprising of 1806, it was regained by Poles and included within the short-lived Duchy of Warsaw, but in 1815 it was re-annexed by Prussia, and was then part of the semi-autonomous Grand Duchy of Posen until 1848, and then part of the Prussian province of Posen until 1918, also within Germany from 1871. Gas lanterns illuminated the town from 1905. In 1908, the town was connected to the railway spur running between Gołańcz (then officially Gollantsch) and Chodzież (Kolmar).

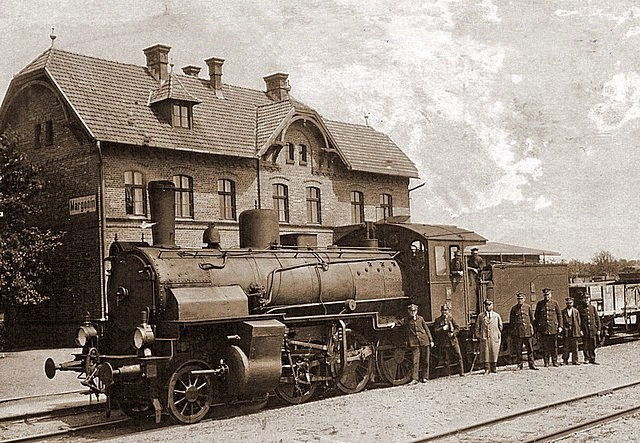
Railway station in the interwar period

After World War I, in 1918, Poland regained independence and the Greater Poland uprising (1918–19) broke out, which aim was to reintegrate the region with Poland. Polish insurgents captured Margonin on 6 January 1919. It was recaptured by Germans in February, despite prior agreements. Nevertheless, in accordance to the Treaty of Versailles, it was reintegrated with Poland in January 1920. 18 inhabitants of Margonin and its suburbs died in the Polish–Soviet War, and four were awarded with the Virtuti Militari, the highest Polish military decoration, for their bravery in the Battle of Warsaw (1920). In interwar Poland Margonin became a popular tourist destination with several hotels.

During World War II, the town was under German occupation from 5 September 1939 to 22 January 1945, the area having been made part of the Reichsgau Wartheland. The Polish population was subjected to various crimes, including murders, deportations to Nazi concentration camps and expulsions. Inhabitants of Margonin were among 41 Poles murdered in the nearby village of Morzewo on 7 November 1939. On 10–12 December 1939 the Germans expelled many Polish inhabitants to the Warsaw District of the General Government in German-occupied central Poland. The Germans operated a Nazi prison in the town and a forced labour camp for Jews. The Polish underground resistance movement was active in Margonin, and many of its members died in concentration camps, after the Germans discovered their operations. Following World War II, the area reverted to Poland.

In 1975 the town became part of the Piła Voivodeship, in 1998 part of the Greater Poland Voivodeship. In 2017 the Monument to the Heroes of the Greater Poland Uprising was unveiled in Margonin.

== Transport ==
Margonin lies on the junction of vovoideship roads 193 and 190.

The nearest railway station is in Chodziedż.

== Demographics ==
Historical population

Year	Pop.	±%
1810	1,425	—
1843	1,969	+38.2%
1871	1,943	−1.3%
1880	1,946	+0.2%
1890	1,824	−6.3%
1900	1,765	−3.2%
1910	2,038	+15.5%

Year	Pop.	±%
1921	1,855	−9.0%
1931	2,135	+15.1%
1939	2,330	+9.1%
1950	1,896	−18.6%
1960	2,017	+6.4%
2010	2,989	+48.2%

== People associated with Margonin ==
- Victor Aronstein, doctor
- Miriam Margolyes, actress (great-grandfather born in Margonin)
- Salman Schocken, publisher
- Feliks Sypniewski, artist
- Adam of Wągrowiec, composer
- Józef Wybicki, poet
