= Budzyń, Greater Poland Voivodeship =

Budzyń
- Town
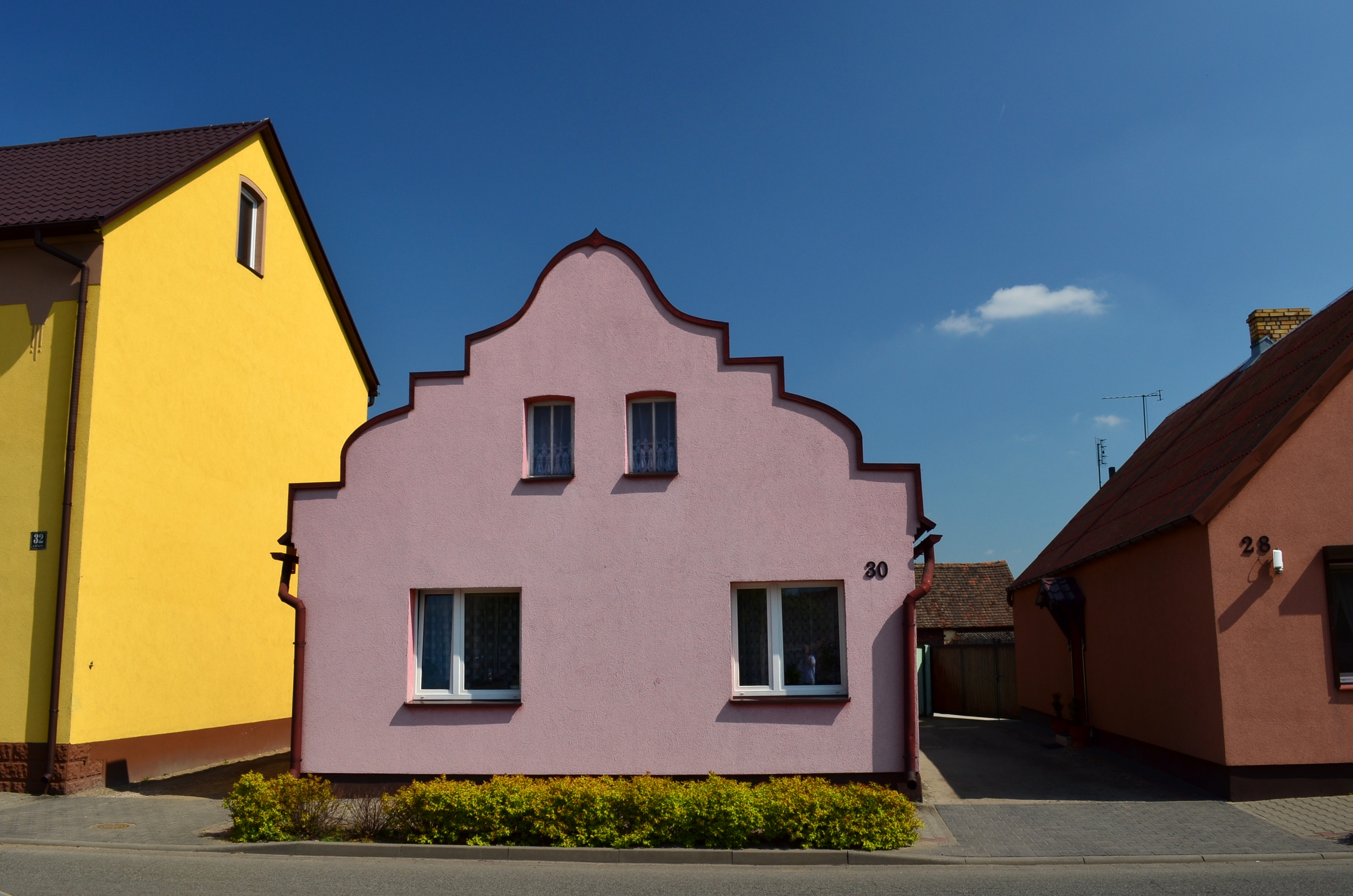
- Colourful old houses in Budzyń

- Flag Coat of arms

- Location within Poland
- Coordinates: 52°53′22″N 16°59′19″E
- Country: Poland
- Voivodeship: Greater Poland
- County: Chodzież
- Gmina: Budzyń
- Highest elevation: 110 m (360 ft)
- Lowest elevation: 100 m (330 ft)

Population
  - Total: 4,861
- Time zone: UTC+1 (CET)
  - Summer (DST): UTC+2 (CEST)
- Vehicle registration: PCH

Budzyń [ˈbud͡zɨɲ] is a town in Chodzież County, Greater Poland Voivodeship, in west-central Poland. It is the seat of the gmina (administrative district) called Gmina Budzyń.

The town has a population of 4,861.

== History ==
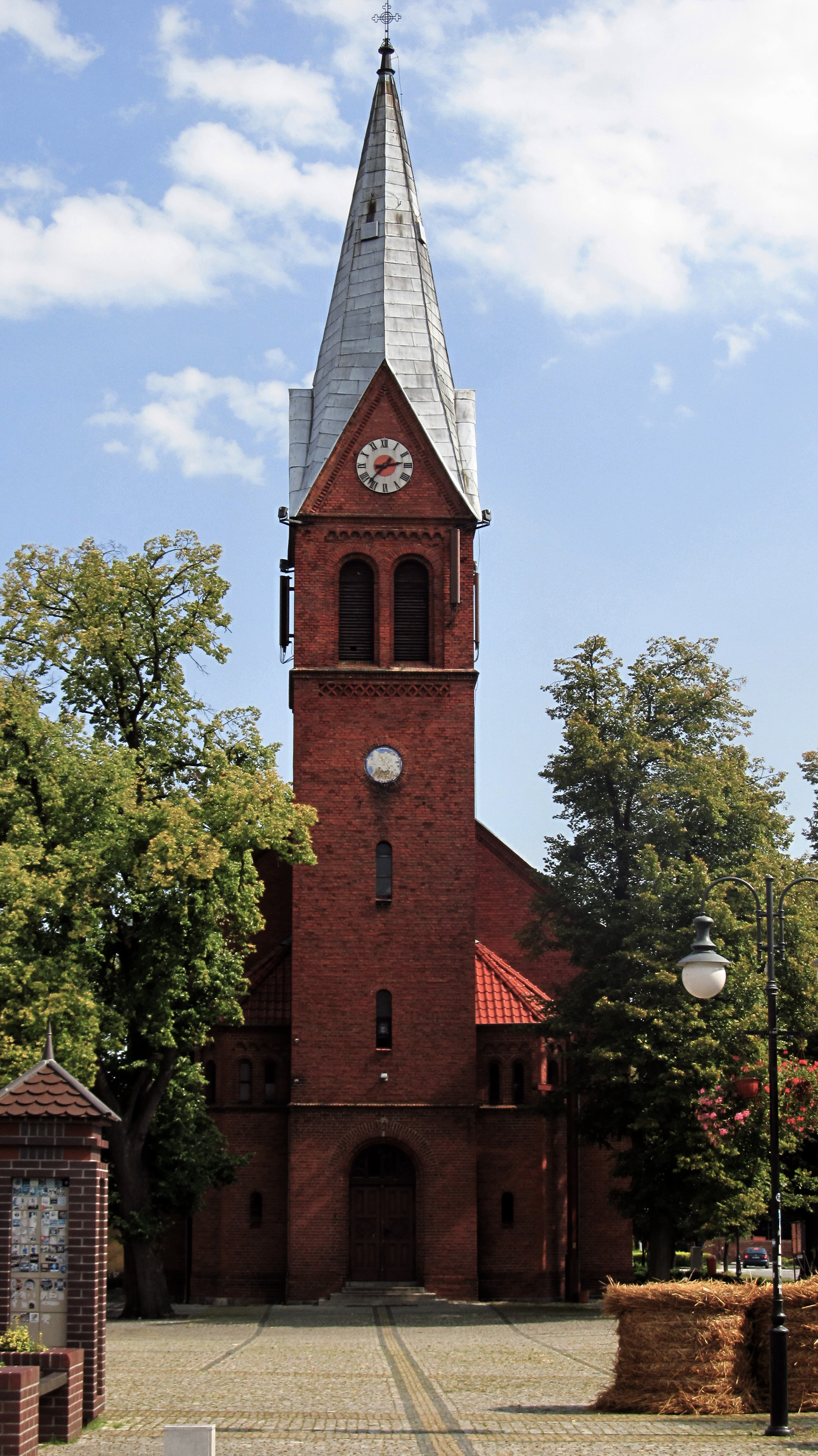
Saint Andrew Bobola church

Budzyń was granted town rights in 1458 by King Casimir IV Jagiellon. It was a royal town of the Kingdom of Poland, administratively located in the Poznań County in the Poznań Voivodeship in the Greater Poland Province.

In September 1939, during the German invasion of Poland at the start of World War II, the German Selbstschutz carried out executions of several local Poles. Also in September 1939, the Germans destroyed the local monument to Polish leader Józef Piłsudski. Further executions of Poles from Budzyń, incl. the local school principal, priest, police chief, craftsmen and farmers, were committed in November 1939 in nearby Morzewo as part of the Intelligenzaktion. In December 1939, the German police and Selbstschutz carried out expulsions of Poles, who were deported to the General Government in the more eastern part of German-occupied Poland, while their houses and farms were handed over to German colonists as part of the Lebensraum policy.

== Demographics ==
Historical population

Year	Pop.	±%
1843	1,592	—
1871	1,878	+18.0%
1880	1,923	+2.4%
1890	1,973	+2.6%

Year	Pop.	±%
1900	2,018	+2.3%
1910	2,022	+0.2%
1921	1,889	−6.6%
1931	1,951	+3.3%
