= Standesamt =

German civil registration office

A Standesamt (German: [ˈʃtandəsˌʔamt]; pl. Standesämter, German: [ˈʃtandəsˌʔɛmtɐ]) is a German civil registration office, which is responsible for carrying out the tasks stipulated in the Civil Status Act (Personenstandsgesetz), in particular for maintaining civil status registers, preparing civil status documents and other tasks.

Soon after the German Empire was created in 1871 from the previous collection of German states (kingdoms, duchies, etc.), a universal system of register offices was established, taking effect on 1 January 1876. The system had previously been introduced in Prussia on 1 October 1874, and had been in use since the beginning of the 19th century in areas where the French Civil Code applied. Usually, the office was located in the local city or town hall.

Today, those register offices (Standesämter) are still part of the administration of every German municipality (in small communities, they are often incorporated with other offices of the administration). Since 1876, Germans in Germany can only enter into a legal marriage in a Standesamt. Therefore, every German marriage takes place before the local registrar (called Standesbeamter). A religious ceremony has no legal effect and, until the year 2009, could only be organised afterwards. Apart from that, every child born in Germany has to be registered at a register office (normally by its parents) and every death has to be registered, also. Same sex life partnerships were also registered at Standesamts from 2001, until the legalisation of same-sex marriage in Germany in 2017.

People who are born in Germany can get a copy of their birth certificates in the Standesamt office.

The term "Standesamt" is also used for Austrian register offices, whereas in Switzerland the German word for register office is "Zivilstandsamt".

Registry office in Frankfurt am Main - portal figure with culmination story

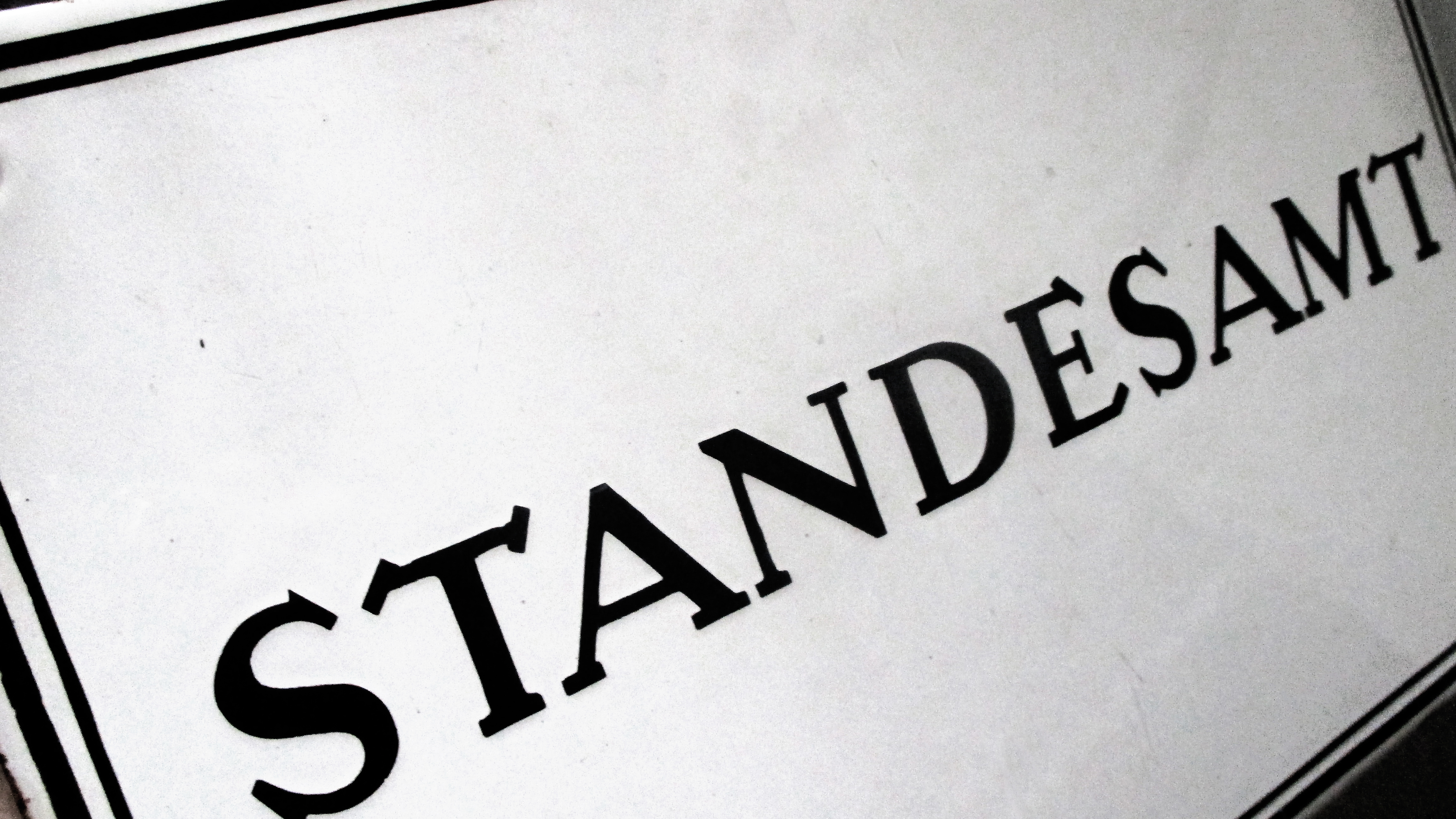
An enamel sign representing a Standesamt in 1950

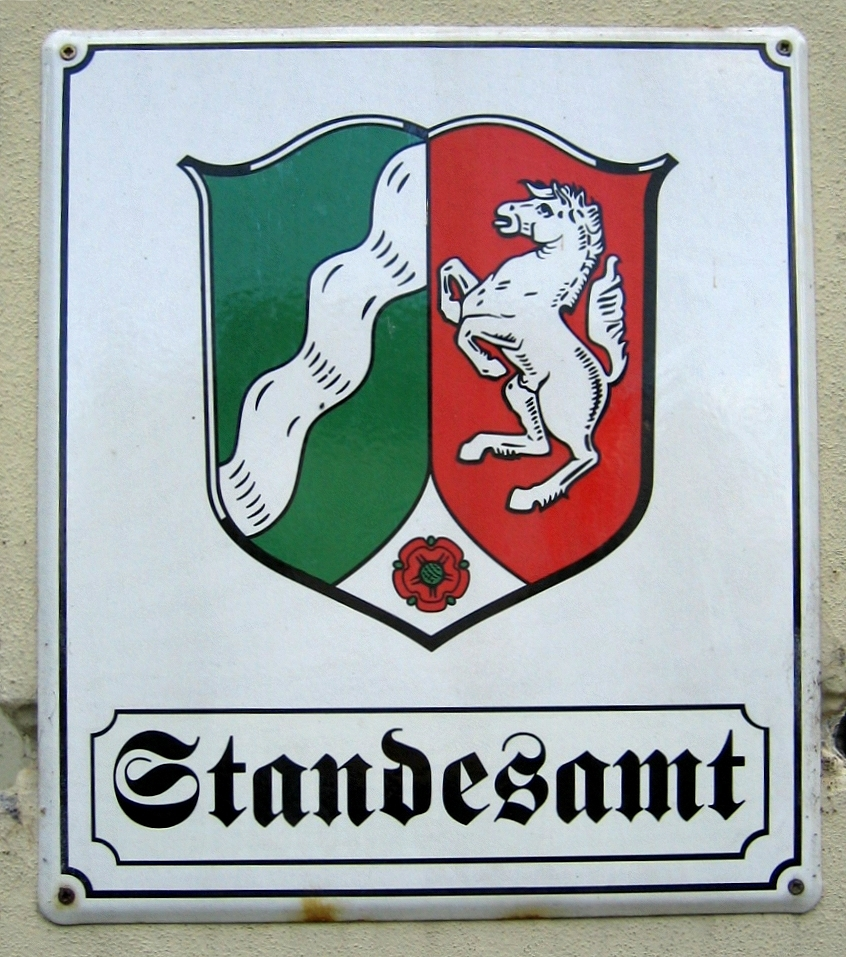
A sign in North Rhine-Westphalia

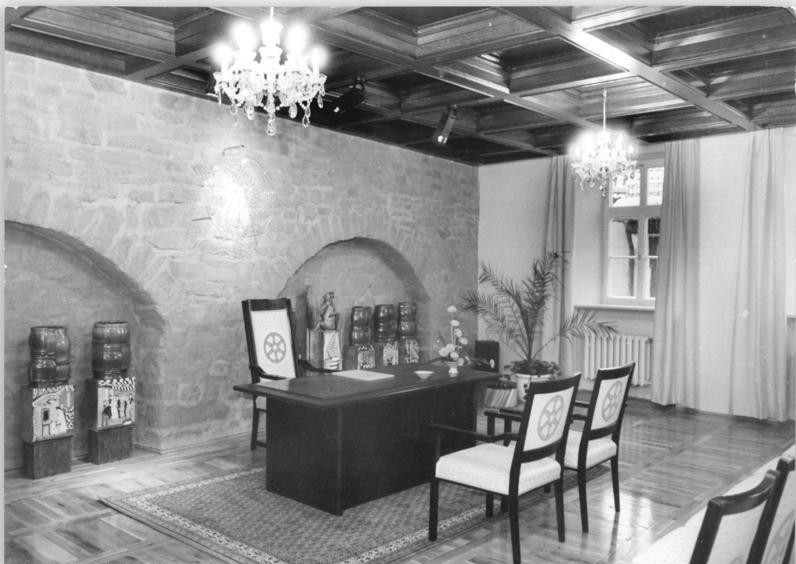
The inside of a Standesamt in Erfurt in 1989

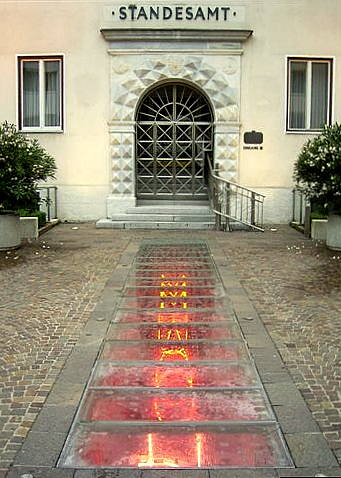
The front door of a Standesamt in Villach
