= Chodzież County =

Chodzież County Powiat chodzieski
- County
- Flag Coat of arms

- Location within the voivodeship
- Coordinates (Chodzież): 52°59′N 16°54′E
- Country: Poland
- Voivodeship: Greater Poland
- Seat: Chodzież
- Gminas: Total 5 (incl. 1 urban): Chodzież; Gmina Budzyń; Gmina Chodzież; Gmina Margonin; Gmina Szamocin

Area
  - Total: 680.58 km^{2} (262.77 sq mi)

Population (2006)
  - Total: 46,967
  - Density: 69.010/km^{2} (178.74/sq mi)
  - Urban: 26,875
  - Rural: 20,092
- Car plates: PCH
- Website: www.powiat-chodzieski.pl

Chodzież County (Polish: powiat chodzieski) is a unit of territorial administration and local government (powiat) in Greater Poland Voivodeship, west-central Poland. It came into being on January 1, 1999, as a result of the Polish local government reforms passed in 1998. Its administrative seat and largest town is Chodzież, which lies 65 kilometres (40 mi) north of the regional capital Poznań. The county also contains the towns of Szamocin, lying 16 km (10 mi) east of Chodzież, and Margonin, 13 km (8 mi) east of Chodzież.

The county covers an area of 680.58 square kilometres (262.8 sq mi). As of 2006 its total population is 46,967, out of which the population of Chodzież is 19,652, that of Szamocin is 4,267, that of Margonin is 2,956, and the rural population is 20,092.

== Neighbouring counties ==
Chodzież County is bordered by Piła County to the north, Wągrowiec County to the south-east, Oborniki County to the south and Czarnków-Trzcianka County to the west.

== Administrative divisions ==
The county is subdivided into five gminas (one urban, two urban-rural and two rural). These are listed in the following table, in descending order of population.

Gmina	Type	Area (km^{2})	Population (2006)	Seat
Chodzież	urban	12.8	19,652	
Gmina Budzyń	rural	207.6	8,202	Budzyń
Gmina Szamocin	urban-rural	125.5	7,292	Szamocin
Gmina Margonin	urban-rural	122.0	6,414	Margonin
Gmina Chodzież	rural	212.7	5,407	Chodzież *
* seat not part of the gmina
