= Doris von Schönthan =

German model, journalist, photographer and resistance fighter

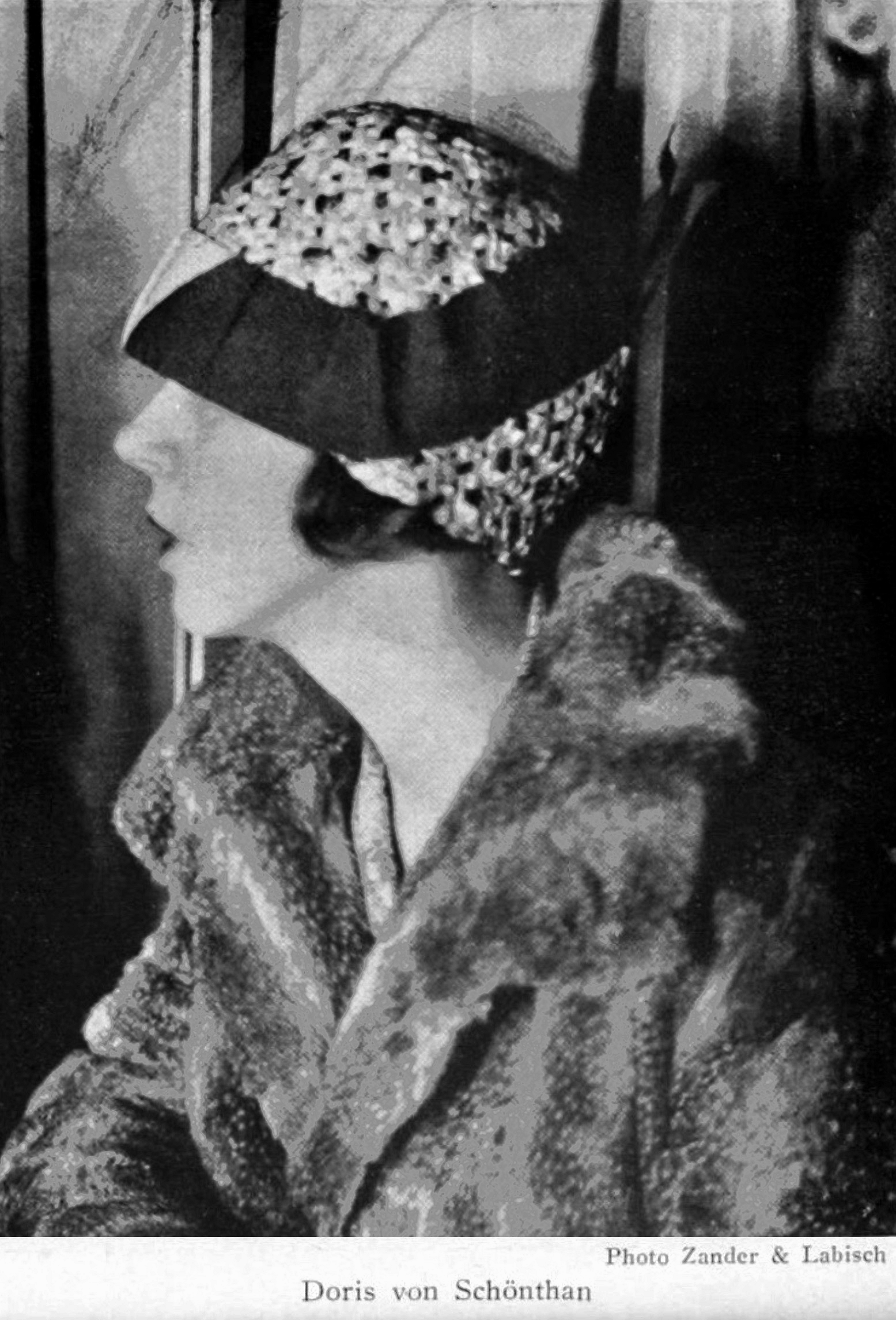
Doris von Schönthan in 1927 (press photo)

Doris von Schönthan (1905–1961), born Maria-Dorothea Ehemann (also Doris Ehemann; Doris von Salomon; Doris de Salomon; Maria-Dorothea von Salomon; Maria-Dorothea von Schönthan; Maria-Dorothea von Salomon-Schönthan; Doris von Salomon-Schönthan), called 'Dorinde', was a German model, a copywriter, journalist and photographer. She is characterised as a dazzling figure of the Weimar Republic or bohemian of the Roaring Twenties.

== Family and circle of friends ==
Schönthan was born in Worms. As an early orphan, she was adopted by the Berlin comedy writer Franz von Schönthan, who together with his brother Paul became known for the comedy Der Raub der Sabinerinnen and worked behind the scenes, for example, on operettas to the music of Eduard Künneke. Professionally, she was partly employed, partly freelance, such as for a Berlin "advertising service of American style" (advertising agency), for Berlin daily newspapers, magazines and illustrated papers. She was portrayed in drawings by Paul Citroen, 1927 but also by the contemporary cultural magazine Der Querschnitt.

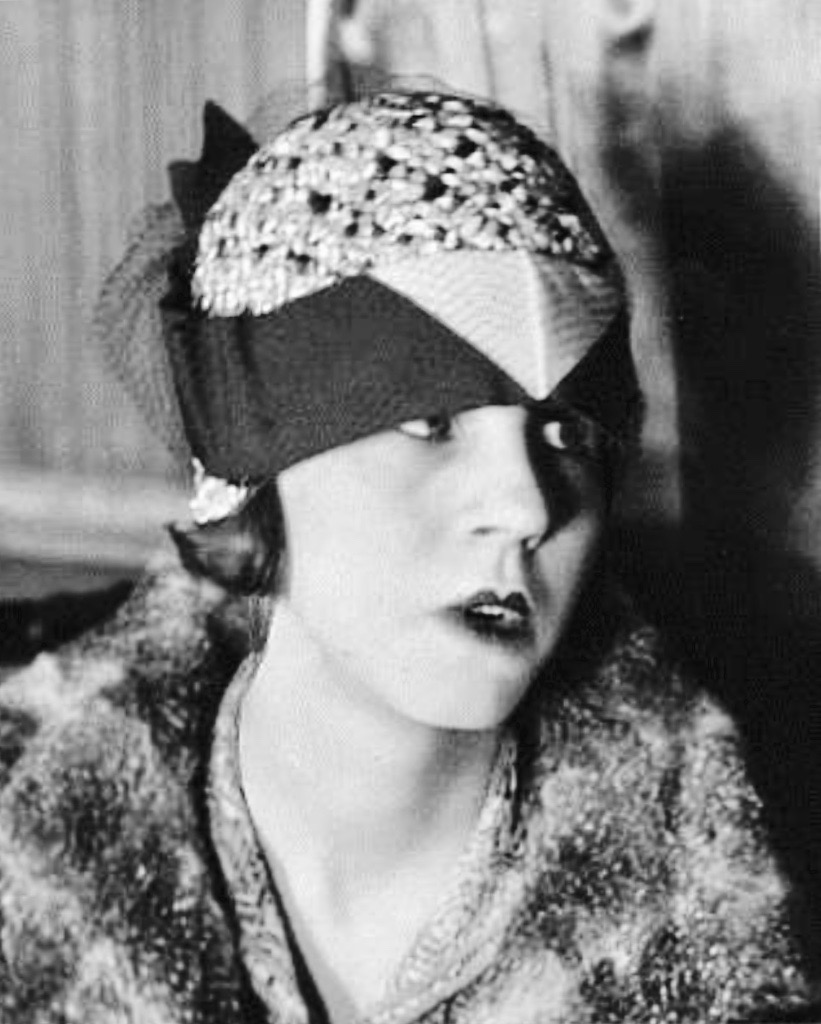
Doris von Schönthan, portrayed by Zander & Labisch in 1927 for the cultural magazine Der Querschnitt

Schönthan belonged to the circle of friends around the closely connected siblings Erika and Klaus Mann, into which she brought Grete Dispeker (later married Weil), their friend from their shared childhood days at Tegernsee The brothers Edgar (1908-1941) and Hans Joseph Weil (1906-1969) and their friend Walter Jockisch (1907-1970) were also integrated. Dispeker admiringly called her a cherub.

The writer Franz Hessel fell in love with her and publicly dedicated his Doris-Texte (among others Leichtes Berliner Frühlingsfieber, some texts in Nachfeier, both titles in 1929) to her. During walks through Berlin together, he served as a pretext for her to be able to photograph people unnoticed by seemingly aiming her camera at him at a suitable spot in order to deceive the actual photo subjects or lull them into a sense of security. In reality, she photographed past him, for example in the Schöneberger Heinrich-von-Kleist-Park or people stepping out of the KaDeWe after shopping and strolling past its blue-uniformed porter with a German shepherd dog. She looked for types: a park bench with "broads", another with old men, scuffling little boys, children playing in the sandbox, ball players, a "slutty Venus" in the Königskolonnaden, women and men with "Kneifer", an old toilet woman....

Mit Hessel und Hilmar Adolf Otto Maximilian Thankmar von Münchhausen (1894–1976) verband Doris von Schönthan Ende der 1920er Jahre eine Dreiecksbeziehung. Gut befreundet war sie auch mit Ruth Landshoff-Yorck und Walter Benjamin, Walter Hasenclever and Alfred Kantorowicz, described by these as a "lovely woman", as "tall and slender, of fragile grace, nervously endangered" or as "lean and witty" or as "very thin, disjointed, uncommonly forgetful and scattered".

Klaus Mann described her in his diary as a "companion of my borderline walks between self-awareness and self-destruction": "Big evening with Doris. In search of cocaine. With transvestites taxi into the city [...] Finally the stuff. To Doris. Taken." He briefly considered marrying her. She remained friends with him until his death in Cannes and also supported him financially. She took him to a clinic in Nice for detoxification on 4 May 1949, after he had taken an overdose of sleeping pills. Von Schönthan informed Thomas Mann, who was staying at the Grand Hotel in Stockholm, of Klaus' critical condition by telegram on 21 May 1949. That same evening, she informed the Mann family and friends of Klaus Mann's death by telephone.

== Political resistance ==
In 1933, she distributed anti-fascist flyers in the Reich capital together with Elisabeth Hauptmann and Friedrich Wolf. Politically persecuted persons such as Rudolf Olden found shelter in her flat. When she strictly refused to formulate professionally in the spirit of NS diction, it became so dangerous for her that she emigrated to France. Through this she met the political activist Bruno von Salomon in Paris; they both married. During the Battle of France in May and June 1940, both were initially interned as enemy aliens about one thousand kilometres apart, she in southern France, but were able to resume their resistance work afterwards and joined the French Resistance.

== Return to Germany ==
In 1952 she returned to Germany; life in emigration and the illegality caused by the resistance had shattered her physically and psychologically. In the same year her husband died. She was committed to a mental institution between 1952 and 1954, fled from there and called Alfred Kantorowicz from the Berlin Friedrichstraße station, crying and talking confusedly. She unsuccessfully sought redress from the authorities for her persecution during the Nazi era. The glamour girl of the Weimar era became increasingly lonely and slipped away. She became destitute, attempted suicide and eventually became homeless. After she was unable to pay for a meal in a Berlin pub, she was remanded in custody for dine and dash. From November 1961, her four-page letter to the German journalist and publicist Manfred George, who had been in exile since 1933, survives; she knew him personally from their time working together as journalists before 1933. Resigned, she is said to have emigrated again to France, where she died of a cerebral stroke in Paris.

== Film ==
Schönthan was portrayed by the actress Naomi Krauss in the 2001 three-part television film Die Manns – Ein Jahrhundertroman by Heinrich Breloer.
