= Zander & Labisch =

German photo agency

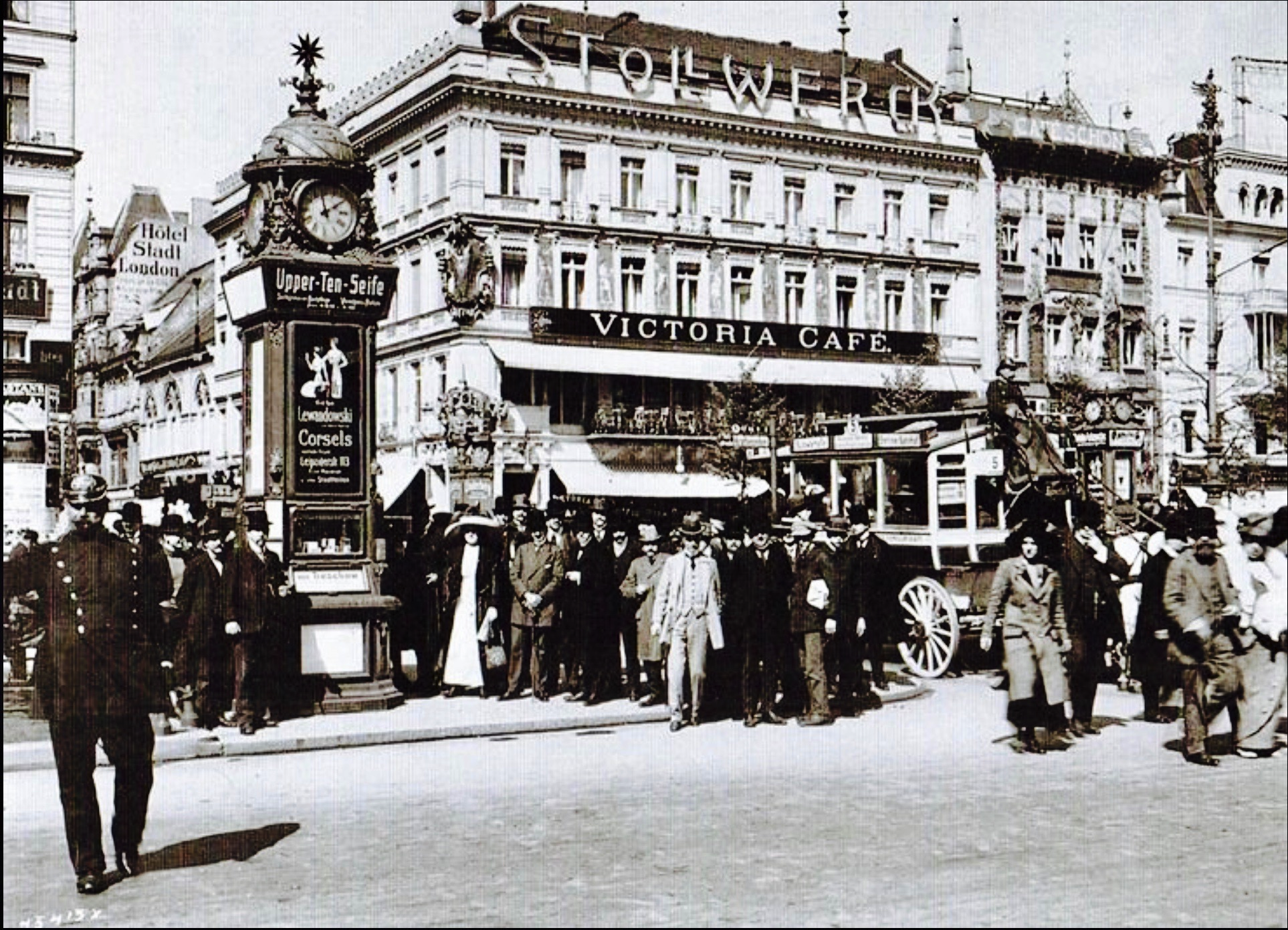
1913: Berlin street scene Unter den Linden / Friedrichstraße, photographed by Zander & Labisch

Zander & Labisch was the first German photographic studio which, as a photo agency, dealt exclusively with the production of professional press photos and their direct distribution. The German Administration closed Zander & Labisch in 1939 with the Verordnung zur Ausschaltung der Juden aus dem deutschen Wirtschaftsleben.

== History ==
=== Establishment ===
The second half of the 19th century saw rapid leaps in the development of photographic and printing technology. This had an impact on all print media. This development was recognised by the engineer and photographer Albert Zander, who came from Chodzież near Posen (1864-1897) and the rabbi and photographer Siegmund Labisch, who came from Szamotuły in the same region (1863-1942) as possibilities and opportunities to develop a business model from the increased demand of publishers, editors and readers for up-to-date press photos of good quality.

The Ullstein Verlag, for example, added its own image etching department to its printing works in 1896 for the faster production of autotypes, which also resulted in shorter editorial times. Previously, it was simply too time-consuming to bring the fine lines of the xylography image blocks into the curvature of the rotary cylinder; photos in daily newspapers therefore remained an exception.

Zander was by then an engineer at the Berlin machine factory Carl Flohr, which had existed since 1844, at Chausseestraße 35, Oranienburger Vorstadt (Berlin-Mitte) It later became the Flohr-OTIS company, specialising in passenger and freight lifts. On 26 May 1895, a fire broke out there, which Zander photographed. Two of his photographs were subsequently published by the Berliner Illustrirte Zeitung.

On 19 June 1895, both founded their photo studio in Berlin (Leipziger Straße 105) under the company name Zander & Labisch, Photographischer Betrieb für gewerbliche Zwecke. According to another source, the company was first called Zander & Labisch-Illustrations-Photographen, später firmierten sie als Zander & Labisch Neue Photographische Gesellschaft A. G., zuletzt als Zander & Labisch oHG.

=== German Empire ===
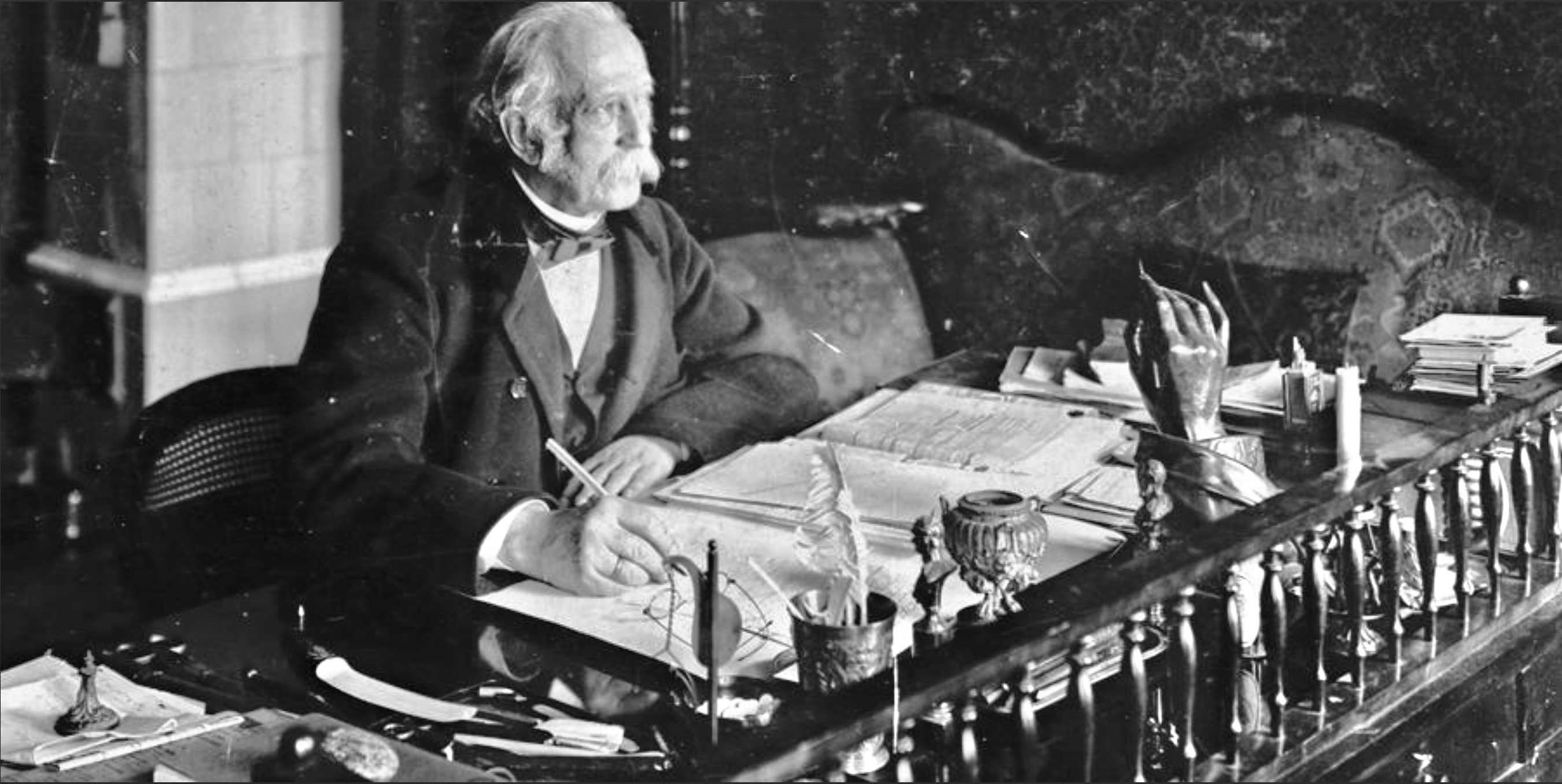
1896: Zander & Labisch moved Theodor Fontane's desk to put it appropriately in the picture and in the right light.

The photo studio specialised in supplying the press, daily newspapers, magazines and illustrated magazines. It was thus involved in the emergence of a tabloid press in Germany. The agency was initially located at Leipziger Straße 105, in close proximity to important newspaper publishers such as the August Scherl publishing house or the Ullstein Verlag. When Zander died unexpectedly early on 12 August 1897, Labisch continued to run the photo studio alone, but kept its company name Zander & Labisch.

The portfolio of the photo studio included daily events and happenings as well as portrait photos of contemporary personalities who were of interest to the press. Already two years later, about one tenth of all photographs published in the Berliner Illustrirten Zeitung were by Zander & Labisch In 1897, the photo studio had to look for larger premises and moved to Mohrenstraße 19, where two of their employees, Olga Badenberg and Waldemar Titzenthaler, had previously worked.

Around the turn of the century, the photo agency set its sights on new fields of activity, such as architecture, industry and theatre photography. As a result, the agency gained new clients in addition to the press: AEG, Borsig, Osram and Siemens were among its renowned internationally active clients. The large companies used 'Zander & Labisch', for example, to have photo documentations of their products made for their company archives, but also for advertising purposes. The photo agency was also active outside Berlin. In 1905, for example, it photographed Jewish institutions in Hamburg for the magazine Ost und West – illustrierte Monatsschrift für das gesamte Judentum.

On 1 October 1917, Labisch took his Strasbourg-born nephew Paul Wittkowsky (1892-1949) into the company as co-owner. In 1918, the agency moved from Mohrenstraße 19 to Leipziger Straße 115/116. There, premises were created for portrait photography, in which a separate department specialised in the future. At this time, the photo agency had nine employees, with whom it was able to work off the numerous orders of the Golden Twenties.

=== Weimar Republic ===
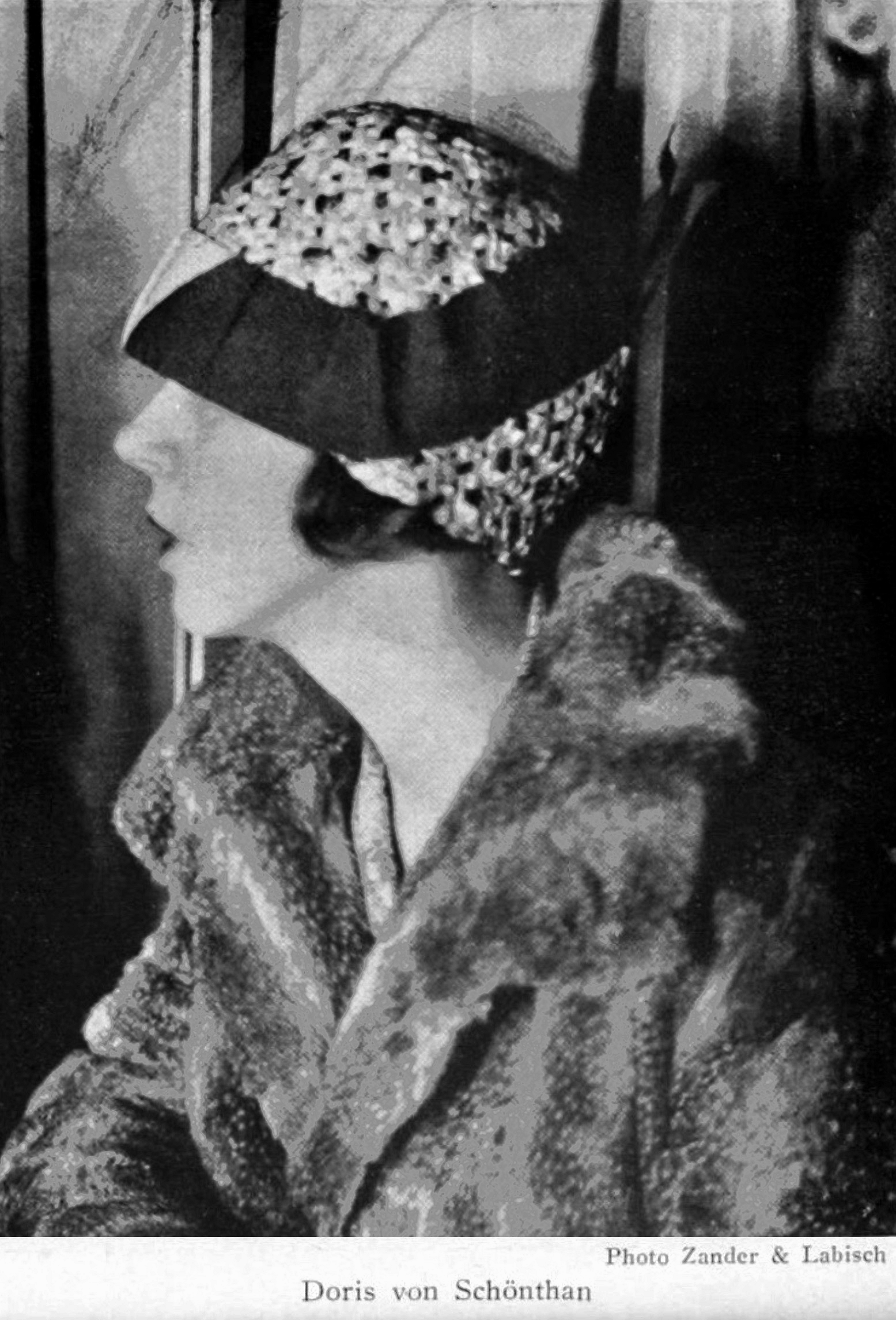
1927: Doris von Schönthan, a prime example of portrait photography by Zander & Labisch

In 1929, the society magazine Die Dame, "das beste Journal seiner Art auf dem Weltmarkt" (the best journal of its kind on the world market), published five full pages of photographs from Alfred Flechtheim's Berlin flat, which was "a celebrity hangout of Berlin at the time" for "artists, bankers, literati, screen and stage stars, journalists, scholars and athletes." The photographs were all made by 'Zander & Labisch'. On the basis of portraits of artists made by the agency, heavily coloured collector's pictures in the series Bühnenstars und ihre Autogramme were also produced under their label, in which the artists posed in costumes of their most famous roles.

=== Nazi era ===
The Seizure of Power by the Nazis and their anti-Semitism had a significant impact on 'Zander & Labisch'. The company suffered massive losses in sales. Newspaper publishers no longer placed orders with the company because they were no longer supposed to employ Jewish staff and suppliers. The first redundancies occurred at Zander & Labsich. On 14 March 1936, the agency was excluded from the Reichsverband der deutschen Korrespondenz- und Nachrichtenbüros (Reich Association of German Correspondence and News Agencies) and thus from the superior Reichspressekammer (RPK). In architectural and industrial photography, however, Zander & Labisch was still able to remain active for some time.

In 1938, however, the photo agency had to give up its premises in Leipziger Straße. The remaining business was moved entirely to the private flats of the two owners Labisch and Wittkowsky, where they completed orders from the private sector on a small scale.

As the Verordnung zur Ausschaltung der Juden aus dem deutschen Wirtschaftsleben came into force, Zander & Labisch had to finally cease business activities on 31 December 1938. In 1939, the company was deleted from the Berlin commercial register. Wittkowsky emigrated to Australia on 11 May 1939., Labisch perished in the Theresienstadt Ghetto in 1942.

== Known employees ==
- Siegmund Labisch (1863–1942)
- Max Missmann (1874–1945)
- Waldemar Titzenthaler (1869–1937)
- Albert Zander (1864–1897)

== Celebrities as photo subjects ==
- Leo Blech.
- Hans Brausewetter
- Käthe Dorsch
- Tilla Durieux.
- Maria Fein
- Alfred Flechtheim
- Theodor Fontane.
- Rudolf Forster
- Otto Gebühr
- Maxim Gorki
- Max Gülstorff
- Käthe Haack
- Liane Haid
- Max Hansen
- Paul Hörbiger
- Friedrich Hollaender
- Camilla Horn
- Oskar Karlweis
- Klabund
- Carlos Kleiber.
- Fritz Kortner
- Fritz Kreisler
- Theo Lingen
- Lucie Mannheim
- Adolph von Menzel.
- Anni Mewes
- Hubert von Meyerinck
- Friedrich Wilhelm Murnau.
- Carola Neher
- Max Pallenberg
- Doris von Schönthan
- Edith Schollwer
- Leo Slezak
- Tiller Girls
- Conrad Veidt
- Otto Wallburg
- Mathias Wieman
