= Standesamt Kolmar =

Standesamt Kolmar was a civil registration district (Standesamt) located in Kreis Kolmar, province of Posen of the German Empire (1871–1918) and administered the communities of:

Community	Polish name	Type	1895 Pop	Prot	Cath	Jew	Civil Ofc	Police Ofc	Court Ofc	Cath. Ch	Prot. Ch	Notes	More
Kolmar	Chodzież	Town	3567	1849	1280	437	Kol (S)	Kol	Kol	Kol	Kol
Augustenau	Augustynowo / Wymyslaw	232	175	57
Borken Mühl	Borka
Buczkowo		Village	199	152	47		Kol (L)	Kol	Kol	Kol	Kol
Chodschesen, Schloß	Chodzieski Zamek	Village	72	45	16	11	Kol (L)	Kol	Kol	Kol	Kol
Chodschesen, Stadtmühle	Miejski Mlyn	Estate	47	31	16		Kol (L)	Kol	Kol	Kol	Kol
Helmsgrün		Estate	59	51	8		Kol (L)	Kol	Kol	Kol	Kol
Kamionke	Kamionka	Village	123	108	15		Kol (L)	Kol	Kol	Kol	Kol
Krumke Neuwerder		Village	328	240	88		Kol (L)	Kol	Kol	Kol	Kol
Milsch	Milcz	Village	350	274	76		Kol (L)	Kol	Kol	Kol	Kol
Nikolskowo		Estate	442	168	274		Kol (L)	Usc	Kol	Usc	Kol
Nikolskowo		Village	264	58	206		Kol (L)	Usc	Kol	Usc	Kol
Ober Lesnitz	Olesnica	Estate	652	375	277		Kol (L)	Kol	Kol	Kol	Kol
Pietronke	Pietronki	Estate	333	170	163		Kol (L)	Kol	Kol	Kol	Kol
Pietronke	Pietronki	Village	30	20	10		Kol (L)	Kol	Kol	Kol	Kol
Rattai	Rataje	Village	274	186	88		Kol (L)	Kol	Kol	Kol	Kol
Rattai	Rataje	Estate	109	66	43		Kol (L)	Kol	Kol	Kol	Kol
Schütz Haus
Studsin	Studzieniec	Village	273	246	27		Kol (L)	Kol	Kol	Kol	Kol
Wilsbach		Village	82	23	59		Kol (L)	Kol	Kol	Kol, Usc	Kol
Unter Lesnitz	Zamkowy Folwark / Babiadziura

Kol (S) = Kolmar (town); Kol (L) = Kolmar (rural area); Usc = Usch
Population data may be inaccurate (see German census of 1895).

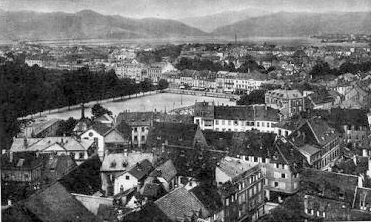

The area around Kolmar was hilly and forested, sometimes called the "Switzerland of Posen". Three lakes surround the town. The Standesamt region also included the area north of the hills, encompassing the Netze river farming communities. This area probably contains the greatest elevation difference of the entire province, from about 200 meters above sea level to about 40 meters.

The area was a major crossroads for both vehicle and rail. The railroad from Posen to Schneidemühl passed through Kolmer north/south and a line branched off to the east along the river bluff and then dipped south to Margonin, then back east to Gollantsh and points east. Major roads followed the same routes, except the east road continued along the bluff to Samotschin, and it had a western route, towards Czarnikau.

Like many other Posen communities, weaving was a major cottage industry until tariffs and industrialization made it unprofitable. A substantial ceramics (especially majolica) factory operated northwest of Kolmar for many years.
