= Albert Zander =

German photographer (1864–1897)

Albert Zander (1 January 1864 in Chodzież near Posen – 12 August 1897) was a German engineer, photographer and entrepreneur. He was instrumental in the emergence of German tabloid journalism.

As an engineer, he was initially employed by the Carl Flohr Berlin machine factory. On 26 May 1895, Zander photographed a fire that broke out on the company premises. Two of his photographs of this event were published by the Berliner Illustrirte Zeitung.

Together with a partner, the merchant and photographer Siegmund Labisch, also from the Posen area, he founded the photo studio Zander & Labisch-Illustrations-Photographen in Berlin on 19 June 1895, which developed into the first German photo agency to produce and distribute up-to-date photographs for press organs in the spirit of photo journalism.

The photo studio developed considerably until Zander's early death: ten percent of all press photos published by the Berliner Illustrirte Zeitung in 1897 came from Zander & Labisch.

Zander died in Charlottenburg at the age of 33.
