= Boulevard Solitude =

Lyric drama in seven tableaux by Hans Werner Henze

- Lyrisches Drama by Hans Werner Henze
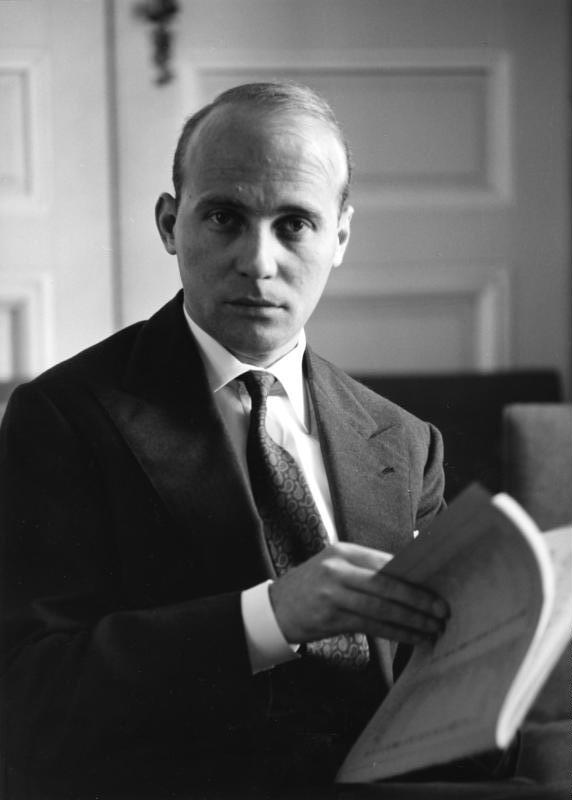
- The composer in 1960
- Librettist: Grete Weil
- Language: German
- Based on: Abbé Prévost's Manon Lescaut
- Premiere: 17 February 1952; Landestheater Hannover

Boulevard Solitude is a Lyrisches Drama (lyric drama) or opera in one act by Hans Werner Henze to a German libretto by Grete Weil after the play by Walter Jockisch, in its turn a modern retelling of Abbé Prévost's 1731 novel Manon Lescaut. The piece is a reworking of the Manon Lescaut story, already adapted operatically by Auber, Massenet and Puccini, and here relocated to Paris after World War II where, as is noted in Grove, the focus of the story moves away from Manon and towards Armand des Grieux. It became Henze's first fully-fledged opera. The work stands out for its strong jazz influences, from a composer who had hitherto been associated with twelve-tone technique.

The premiere was given on 17 February 1952, at the Landestheater Hannover.

== Performance history ==
Although it never became part of the core operatic repertoire, Boulevard Solitude continued to receive performances after the premiere. It was given in both Naples and Rome in 1954 and it received its UK premiere in London by the New Opera Company at Sadler's Wells in 1962 where the cast included Peter Glossop and April Cantelo. The first performance in the United States was at the Santa Fe Opera in 1967.

The opera continues to be performed and is popular with audiences, with a London revival in 2001 going on to sell heavily despite much negative critical reception and attacks from the tabloid press. A new production by Welsh National Opera in 2014 was also well received.

== Roles ==
Roles, voice types, premiere cast
Role	Voice type	Premiere cast, 17 February 1952 Conductor: Johannes Schüler
Manon Lescaut	high soprano	Sigrid Klaus
Armand des Grieux, a student	lyric tenor	Walter Buckow
Lescaut, Manon's brother	baritone	Theo Zilliken
Francis, Armand's friend	baritone	
Lilaque, père, a rich old gentleman	high buffo tenor	
Lilaque, fils	baritone	
A prostitute	dancer	
Servant to Lilaque, fils	mime	
Two drug addicts	dancers	
A cigarette boy	dancer	
Newspaper sellers, beggars, whores, police, students, travellers

== Synopsis ==
Scene 1: The waiting room of a busy train station in a large French city.

The student Armand des Grieux meets a young woman by the name of Manon Lescaut, who is being brought to boarding school in Lausanne by her brother. Armand instantly falls in love with Manon, and the two run off to Paris together.

Scene 2: An attic in Paris.

The two live together happily, although in poverty, in an attic room. Armand has been cut off by his father on account of his dissolute lifestyle, and is forced to ask his friend Francis for money. However, Manon's brother reappears during Armand's absence and convinces her to visit an admirer of hers, the wealthy older man Lilaque Sr.

Scene 3: An elegant room in Lilaque's house.

Manon becomes Lilaque Sr.'s mistress, but remains in love with Armand. Her brother appears and begs her for money. When she refuses him saying that she has none, he breaks into Lilaque Sr.'s safe. However Lilaque discovers them and evicts Manon.

Scene 4: The library of the university.

Sometime later, Armand, Francis, and some other students are studying the work of the Roman poet Catullus. Armand is still in love with Manon but this love is fading. Francis tells Armand about Manon's robbing Lilaque and her expulsion from his house, but Armand doesn't believe it. Francis leaves angrily and Manon enters. Manon and Armand read a poem that revives their love.

Scene 5: In a bar.

Manon and Armand are together again. Armand is addicted to drugs in order to try to forget the past. Lescaut (Manon's brother) brings him cocaine in a bar and asks for Manon, who he wishes to procure for Lilaque Jr. When Manon arrives Armand gets angry with Lescaut and Lalique Jr. Manon tries to calm him and then leaves with the two men. Armand receives the message that Manon wishes to see him the next day, when Lilaque leaves. Armand is left confused.

Scene 6: The apartment of Lilaque Jr.

Armand and Manon are together in Lilaque Jr.'s bedroom. Manon is satisfied with the new situation of being under the protection of Lilaque Jr. but Armand is nostalgic for the past in which he still lives. Lescaut appears and warns Armand that he should leave before the servants find him. Armand cuts a picture out of its frame in order to sell it, but is discovered by a servant who reports the incident to Lilaque Sr. who calls the police. Lescaut fights with Lilaque Sr. until Manon shoots the old man with a revolver that had been pressed into her hand by her brother. As Lescaut and Armand flee, Manon is arrested.

Scene 7: The exterior of a prison.

Armand arrives hoping to see his former lover before she is imprisoned. The scene ends with musical numbers from the life of the couple.
