= Dagobert Friedländer =

Dagobert Friedländer (19 February 1826 – 27 June 1904) was a banker and one of only two Jewish members of the House of Lords of Prussia.

== Early life ==
He was born in Chodziesen (1879-1918: Kolmar), in the Prussian Grand Duchy of Posen in 1826. In 1839, he went to live with his uncle, Hazzan Wolff Alexander (brother of Bishop Michael Alexander), to apprentice at his bookstore in Wollstein. He left Wollstein to work in his uncle Adler's business in Vienna in 1840 or 1841, and remained there until 1846 when he returned to Wollstein to work once again in the bookstore. There, in 1850, Dagobert married Pauline Friedmann, with whom he had four children. He also became active in the civic life of the town, taking the position of vice-chair of the City Council, and founding a home for the blind

== Life in Bromberg ==
In 1857, Friedländer moved to Bromberg. He and his brother, Wilhelm founded a bank which became very successful. After the death of his wife in 1864, he was elected to the Bromberg City Council, and in 1874, he was nominated by the city of Bromberg to be its representative in the Upper House of Prussia’s parliament. Upon his appointment, he became only the second Jewish member of the House of Lords. In 1881, in the wake of antisemitic fervor in the area, Dagobert sold his bank and resigned his appointment and moved to Frankfurt

== Later life ==
In 1883, Dagobert returned to the finance business, accepting a position with the Bank for Industry and Commerce in Frankfurt, where he remained until 1891. He left Frankfurt in 1892, moving to Breitenstein in Ermatingen, Switzerland, near Lake Constance; he died there on June 27, 1904.
