= Edgar Weil =

German dramaturge

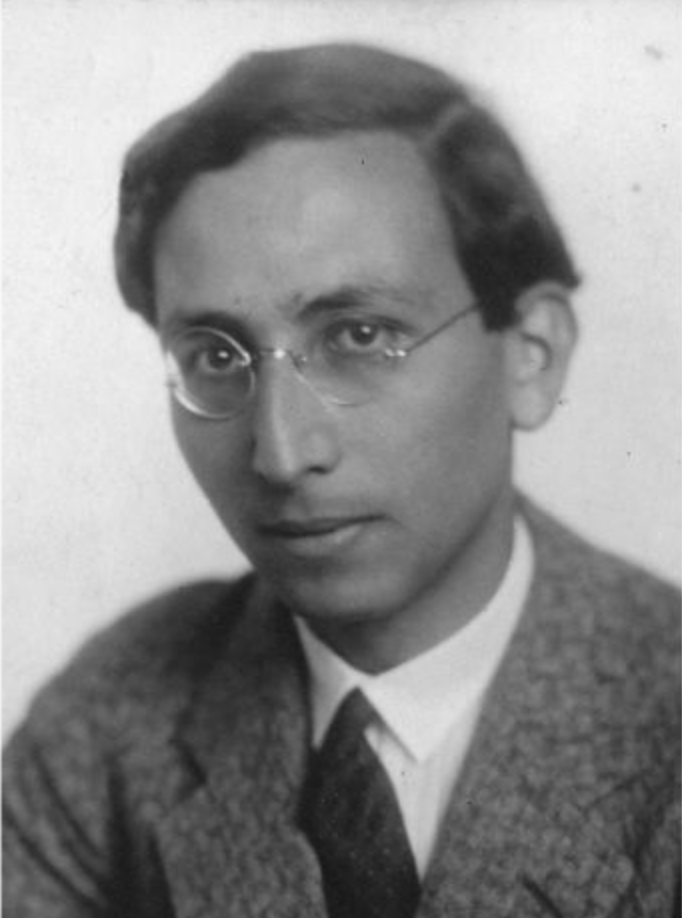
Edgar Weil, ca. 1938

Edgar Weil (7 July 1908 – 17 September 1941) was a German Germanist, dramaturge and merchant.

== Family and circle of friends ==
Born in Frankfurt Weil was the second child of the pharmacist and chemical-pharmaceutical Frankfurt entrepreneur Richard Weil (1875–1917) and his wife Paula (1885–1970), née Höchstädter. His two years older brother, Hans Joseph Weil (1906–1969) studied medicine, obtained his doctorate, became a doctor in Frankfurt and did research in the family business 'Endopharm Frankfurter Arzneimittelfabrik'.

Hans Joseph and Weil grew up mostly in Frankfurt, living in the Friedberger Anlage 9, near their father's company headquarters at Grüne Straße 11–13. After 1920 they became close friends with their fellow pupil Walter Jockisch from the Musterschule. She and Jockisch spent a lot of time together with their grand cousin Grete Dispeker at the family's country house in Egern on Tegernsee. There, they met her friend Doris von Schönthan. Edgar also became close friends with Heinz-Günther Knolle (1912–1999), whom he had met through Jockisch and his cousin Grete, who, from 1925 (Knolle) and 1930 (Jockisch) respectively, worked with the reformpädagogische run by Martin Luserke Landerziehungsheim Schule am Meer on the North Sea island of Juist.

On 26 July 1932, Weil married his grand cousin Grete (1906–1999), née Dispeker, who was two years older. The marriage remained childless.

In exile in the Netherlands, the couple met with friends who had also emigrated to the Netherlands, such as the painter Max Beckmann, the writer Albert Ehrenstein and the conductor Bruno Walter.

== Studium ==
Weil studied German language and literature and doctorate on the topic Alexander von Sternberg (Peter Alexander Freiherr von Ungern-Sternberg) - Ein Beitrag zur Literatur- und Kulturgeschichte des 19. Jahrhunderts'' to the Doctor philosophiae (Dr. phil.).

== Professional development ==
Weil was working as a dramaturge at the Münchner Kammerspiele when his professional prospects and plans were abruptly halted by the Seizure of Power by the Nazis from 30 January 1933. As a Jew, he was immediately dismissed. The Jew-baiting and the enacted Nazi laws, which were intended to successively push Jews in Germany out of public life, made it clear that it was a matter of existence, at first obviously above all of economic foundations. Many professions were thus blocked for Jews. In March 1933 Weil was arbitrarily arrested by the SA and taken into so-called "protective custody", for him and his family a further indication of what was to be expected in the future.

The preservation of his father's pharmaceutical company was also threatened by the state-run Aryanisation, so the family decided to send Edgar to the Netherlands to set up a branch business there, which would secure the company and thus also the family's economic backing from the grasp of the National Socialists. Edgar Weil emigrated in 1933 to set up 'Endopharm' in Amsterdam.

His wife Grete followed him to the Netherlands in 1935 after training as a photographer, where the couple lived in Amstelveen.

In 1938, Weil's mother Paula and his mother-in-law Isabella Dispeker also emigrated to the Netherlands, the latter with the support of Erika Mann's partner Signe von Scanzoni, while his father-in-law died in the same year and his brother Hans Joseph emigrated to Switzerland, from where he later emigrated to the United States.

In the late summer of 1938, the couple travelled to Sanary-sur-Mer in southern France, where they came into contact with Lion Feuchtwanger and Alma Mahler-Werfel and Franz Werfel through their secretary Lola Humm-Sernau. They came into contact with and met Lion Feuchtwanger, Alma Mahler-Werfel and Franz Werfel. At the end of August 1939, Edgar and Grete Weil returned from a joint trip from Switzerland to Amsterdam, shortly before the German invasion of Poland.

When the Wehrmacht made it clear on 10 May 1940 with the Invasion and Occupation of the Netherlands that Germany's neighbouring countries were not a safe haven for persecuted persons, the couple tried in vain to escape by ship to Great Britain via the port of Ijmuiden, where they hoped to meet Grete's older brother, the lawyer Fritz Dispeker (1895–1986). Weil's entrepreneurial plans were thus ended.

== Persecution and deportation ==
The Reichskommissariat Niederlande quickly ensured that the Nuremberg Laws were extended to the occupied territories, a circumstance that also directly affected the Weils and Dispekers. With a Cuban tourist visa, the Weil couple wanted to leave the Netherlands in the summer of 1941. While his wife had already been issued hers, Weil collected his in Rotterdam on 11 June 1941. That same evening, he was arrested by chance in the open street in the course of a raid to pick up 300 Jewish men as part of a reprisal operation.

He was taken to an internment camp and concentration camp in the dunes of North Holland Schoorl, which served as a transit camp. Weil's business partners from Endopharm tried in vain to get him released there by petitioning the German authorities.

He was deported to the Mauthausen concentration camp Grete Weil received a pre-printed postcard on 15 July 1941 informing her of this. Finally, on 3 August, a first letter from her husband reached her, asking her in code not to commit suicide. On 31 August 1941, the last written sign of Edgar Weil's life reached her. On 17 September 1941, he was declared dead at the age of 33. Grete Weil only learned of this in early October 1941 through the Joodsche Raad Amsterdam. The entry in the death register of the Arolsen registry office, which was not made until 1951, lists as cause of death: "Shot on the run." im KZ Mauthausen)

== Publication ==
- Alexander von Sternberg (Peter Alexander Freiherr von Ungern-Sternberg) – Ein Beitrag zur Literatur- und Kulturgeschichte des 19. Jahrhunderts. E. Ebering, Berlin 1932, OCLC 1068181208 (Nachdruck: Kraus Reprint, Nendeln/Liechtenstein 1967)
