= Walter Jockisch =

German educator, dramaturgue, librettist and opera director

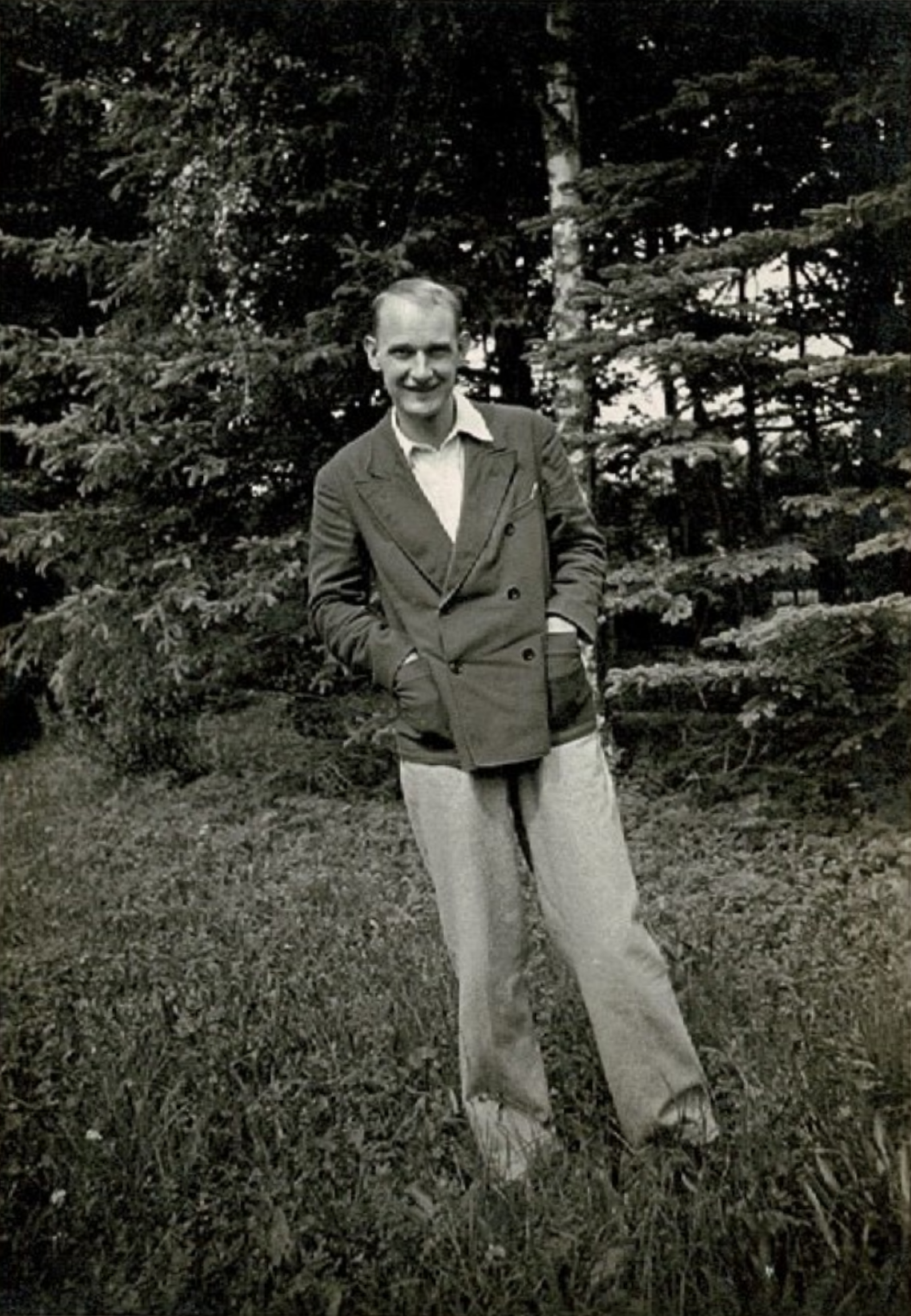
Walter Jockisch in c. 1932

Walter Max Guido Jockisch (20 February 1907 – 22 March 1970) was a German pedagogue, dramaturge, librettist and opera director.

== Family ==
Born in Bad Arolsen, Free State of Waldeck-Pyrmont, Jockisch was the only child of the Oberregierungs-Medizinalrat and Kingdom of Prussia Stabsarzt Franz 'Max' Louis Paul Jockisch (1865–1947) and his first wife Harriet Edeline Eugenie 'Melanie' née von Schlicht (1878–1929). Both parents were evangelical.

On 16 August 1933, Jockisch married the writer Gisela Günther née Schoenfeld (1905–1985) in Berlin-Wilmersdorf. The witnesses to the marriage were the writer Paula Ludwig from Ehrwald in Tyrol, whose son Ludwig Friedel had been a pupil of Jockisch on the North Sea island of Juist, and Gretha Schaettler from Berlin. This marriage nominally produced a daughter, Michaela 'Michele' (born 10 November 1933 in Ehrwald, Tyrol; married to Richard Schenkirz from 1957).

His wife had been married before, then an actress, in 1924 to the merchant Heinrich Max Franz Westphal (born 1900) from Słupsk in Pommerania, who lived in Charlottenburg's Schlüterstraße 12. Their marriage was a marriage of convenience, because she was about to give birth to an illegitimate child whose father was a foreigner. Under the Nazi regime, Jockisch wanted to give the child an Aryan qualification. He had met his wife at the Schule am Meer, where she was later involved with the choir and orchestra director Eduard Zuckmayer, the elder brother of the writer Carl Zuckmayer, who worked there. After their divorce in 1934, Gisela and her daughter Michaela followed Zuckmayer into exile in Ankara, where he – through Paul Hindemith and at the invitation of President Kemal Atatürk – was to shape the entire Turkish music teacher training in the spirit of the German Youth Music Movement. Zuckmayer was not able to marry her until 1947 because the Nazi authorities denied expatriate emigrants a Ehefähigkeitsbescheinigung. After their marriage, he adopted Michaela.

In 1946, Jockisch's childhood friend Grete Weil, née Dispeker, who had been married to his friend Edgar Weil who was murdered in the Mauthausen concentration camp in 1941, visited from their Dutch exile. As both had agreed after Weil's death, Grete Weil first lived with Jockisch in Darmstadt from 1947 onwards; they did not marry until 13 February 1961 in Frankfurt.

I did not go to a lonely place, I went to a man who was waiting for me, my childhood friend Walter Jockisch. Since he, who had become an opera director, had never left Germany, he had a large circle of friends, which soon became mine as well.

— Grete Weil

== School ==
Jockisch grew up for about thirteen years initially at Heiligenbrunner Weg 6 in Gdańsk-Langfuhr, where he attended school until his family moved to Frankfurt in about 1920 to Holbeinstraße 19 in the Sachsenhausen district. He subsequently attended the Musterschule and became close friends with the brothers Edgar (1908–1941) and Hans Joseph Weil (1906–1969), the sons of Richard Weil, a chemical-pharmaceutical manufacturer with a doctorate, who lived at Friedberger Anlage 9, near their father's company headquarters at Grüne Straße 11–13. Through her he met her grandcousin Grete Dispeker and her friend Doris von Schönthan around 1923/24. He thus belonged to the extended circle of friends of two of Thomas Mann's children, the closely related siblings Erika and Klaus Mann. At Easter 1925 he passed his Reifeprüfung for Musterschule.

== Studies ==
He then studied Germanistics, history and English, at the Goethe University Frankfurt and at the Friedrich-Wilhelms-Universität Berlin. and completed his studies in 1929 in Berlin with an inaugural dissertation on Andreas Gryphius und das literarische Barock and his doctorate to Doctor philosophiae (Dr. phil.).

== Professional development ==
=== Educator ===
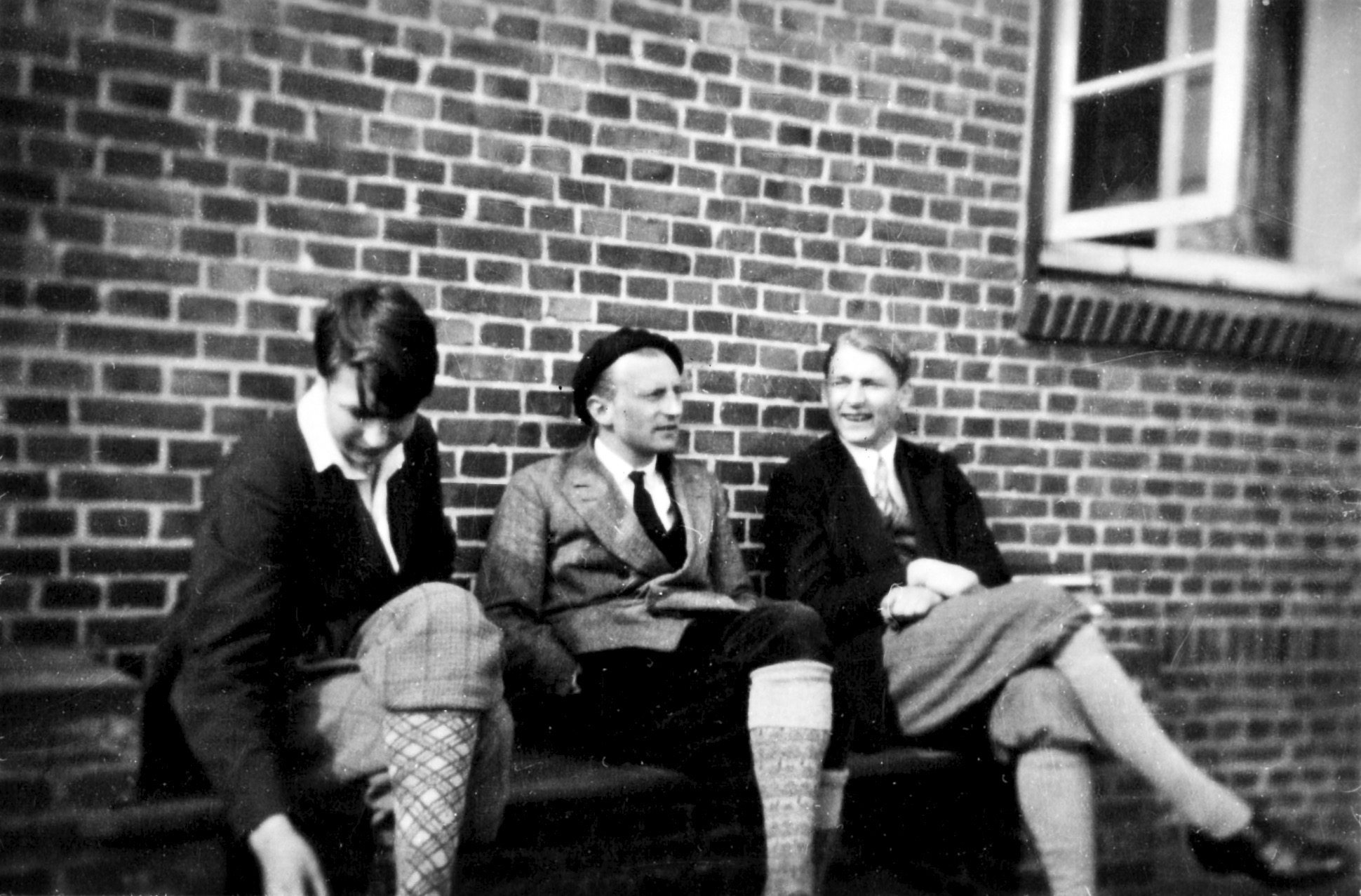
Teacher Friedrich Könekamp (middle) and Walter Jockisch (right) on the site of the Schule am Meer, Juist, c. 1930

Jockisch was first employed from 19 April 1930 to 18 March 1932 as a teacher of German, history, English and Latin at the progressive education run by Martin Luserke Landerziehungsheim Schule am Meer on the East Frisia island Juist, where he became involved in the Darstellendes Spiel run by Luserke. Jockisch was influenced by the free-standing Theaterhalle der Schule am Meer, which was unique, inspiring amateur drama, the German Youth Movement, the Youth Music Movement and professional theatre. Luserke and Carl Zuckmayer wrote texts for Eduard Zuckmayer's compositions at the Schule am Meer. Jockisch's colleagues also included among others Rudolf Aeschlimann, Fritz Hafner, Friedrich Könekamp, Heinrich Karl Ernst Martin Meyer, Anni and Paul Reiner, Günther Rönnebeck as well as Kurt Sydow. He became close friends with the student Heinz-Günther Knolle (1912–1999), who was also friend with Grete Dispeker from September 1929. From 1932, Jockisch and Knolle lived in a shared apartment on the Weinmeisterhöhe in Berlin-Pichelsdorf, Knolle studied at the Humboldt University of Berlin. Jockisch, who after 1933 did not intend to submit to the Nazi dictates, consequently reoriented himself professionally and found a politically largely neutral field of activity.

=== Artistic director ===
Between 1935 and 1937 Jockisch worked as assistant stage manager for Walter Felsenstein and Oskar Wälterlin at the Oper Frankfurt. From 1937 to 1940 he worked under Karl Bauer at the opera and operetta of the Deutsches Theater Göttingen, first as Spielleiter, from 1938 as Oberspielleiter. Bauer took Jockisch with him when he move to the Grillo-Theater in Essen, where he worked from 1940 to 1944, first as drama director, dramaturge and head of the artistic operations office, and from 1941 as head opera director.

In the last months of the Second World War, Walter Jockisch was drafted into the Wehrmacht as a Funker.

At the end of the war and in the immediate post-war period, Jockisch worked again in Frankfurt (1947: Igor Stravinsky / Charles Ferdinand Ramuz' L'Histoire du Soldat), at times probably also at the Bayerische Staatsoper in Munich. From 1946 to 1948, Jockisch was artistic director of the Landestheater at the Orangerie in Darmstadt, at which he had previously guest directed (1943: Capriccio by Richard Strauss; 1946 Gluck's Orfeo ed Euridice). During this time, Hans Werner Henze met him and his partner Grete Weil (from 1947). According to Henze's retrospective description, Jockisch was a "gaunt anthroposophical pedagogue and theatre man".

In 1948, Jockisch was appointed by Ferdinand Leitner as head of opera at the Staatstheater Stuttgart, where he worked until 1950. During this period and thereafter, he guest-directed productions at the Bühnen in Kiel, again at the Landestheater Darmstadt and at the Niedersächsisches Staatstheater Hannover (1951: Wagner's Die Meistersinger von Nürnberg, 1952: world premiere of Henze's Boulevard Solitude, for which Jockisch had written the libretto together with Grete Weil after Abbé Prévosts Histoire du chevalier Des Grieux et de Manon Lescaut).

Between 1960 and 1963, Jockisch worked under artistic director Hermann Christian Mettin (1910–1980) as head of opera and as artistic advisor at the Theater Oberhausen, before moving to Heidelberg in 1964/65 as head of opera and operetta at the Theater & Orchester Heidelberg.

He continued to be active as a guest director in Darmstadt (e.g., 1964: Offenbach's Daphnis et Chloé), at the Theater Bonn, in Berlin at the Tribüne at Ernst-Reuter-Platz (L'Histoire du Soldat) as well as in Switzerland at the Luzerner Theater. There, between 1960 and 1968, under the direction of Horst Gnekow, he staged around twenty music theatre productions, including Wagner's Der fliegende Holländer in 1960, 1961 Orfeo ed Euridice and the Swiss premiere of Brecht/Weill's Aufstieg und Fall der Stadt Mahagonny, 1962 Mozart's Die Hochzeit des Figaro, Gaetano Donizetti's L'elisir d'amore and Jacques Offenbach's Orpheus in the Underworld, 1963 Verdi's La forza del destino, 1964 Mozart's Die Zauberflöte, 1965 Flotow's Martha and Carl Millöcker's Gasparone, 1966 Busoni's Arlecchino and L'Histoire du soldat as well as 1968 Zeller's Der Vogelhändler.

With Gnekow, Jockisch moved to the Theater Münster in 1968, where he served as head of the opera until his death.

Jockisch contracted leukaemia in 1969 and died the following year in Munich at the age of 63.

Correspondence with Walter Jockisch is preserved in the estate of the stage designer and theatre director Wilhelm Reinking in Deutsches Literaturarchiv Marbach (DLA), also in the private archive of Dr. med. dent. Achim Knolle in Löhne.

== Works ==
- as Walther Jockisch: Andreas Gryphius und das literarische Barock, Phil. Diss. Friedrich-Wilhelms-Universität zu Berlin 1929. Erschienen in Germanische Studien, fascicule 89, Emil Ebering, Berlin 1930, OCLC 459626118, (Cover page 1)
- ders.: Die Glückskinder. Steyer Verlag, Wiesbaden / Munich OCLC 1145279663
- as Walter Jockisch: Boulevard Solitude, music Hans Werner Henze, libretto Grete Weil, Szenarium Walter Jockisch. Schott, Mainz 1976, ISBN 3-7957-3352-9.

== Research note ==
Due to the similarity of the name, Walter Jockisch is often confused with the actor Walter Jokisch, who also worked as a theatre director. Walter Jockisch is also partly recorded in the spelling Walther Jockisch, for example in his own dissertation of 1929, published in 1930. Additionally, the fact that his father Dr. med. Franz Max Louis Paul Jockisch was registered in the contemporary address books for Danzig and Frankfurt in the spelling Jokisch, Max, appears confusing, deviating from the civil registry entries.
