= Trojan of Łękno =

Trojan of Łekno (Polish: Trojan z Łekna) was a member of the Pałuk family, who owned the site on which the town of Chodzież (Kolmar) was founded. All that is known about him is that between 1434 and 1450 he held the office of chief judge for the Kalisz province.

His plea caused the Polish king Władysław Jagiełło issue a privilege chartering Chodzież on Magdeburg Law in 1434.
