= Siegmund Labisch =

German photographer

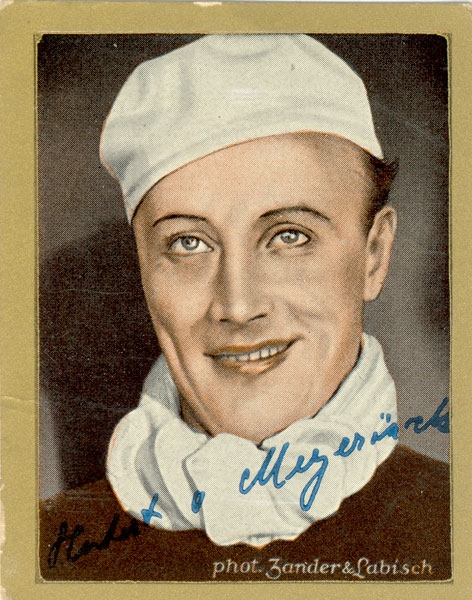
A collector's picture produced by Zander & Labisch from the series Stage stars and their autographs, which were enclosed with the gold Saba cigarettes of the Garbaty cigarette factory in 1933. This picture shows Hubert von Meyerinck.

Siegmund Labisch (30 July 1863 – 7 December 1942) was a businessman, photographer and co-founder of the Zander & Labisch photo agency.

== Life ==
Born in Szamotuły, Bezirk Posen, in 1895 Labisch founded together with the engineer and photographer Albert Zander the Zander & Labisch Illustrations-Photographen photo agency in Berlin, which was the first of its kind to focus on the production and distribution of press photographs. As a result, it succeeded in placing one tenth of all photographs published in the Berliner Illustrirte Zeitung as early as 1897. Zander died of poisoning as early as 12 August 1897. After Zander's death, Siegmund Labisch became the sole owner of the photo agency.

Under the temporary name Zander & Labisch Neue Photographische Gesellschaft A.G., the studio was initially located at Leipziger Straße 105 from 1896 to 1897, and at Mohrenstraße 19 from 1897 to 1900. With the changing addresses (among others Leipziger Straße 115/16) the agency existed until its deletion from the commercial register in 1939. Labisch itself was no longer listed in official address book after 1938.

On 14 September 1942, Labisch was deported to the Theresienstadt Ghetto where he died on 7 December of the same year at the age of 79.

== Work ==
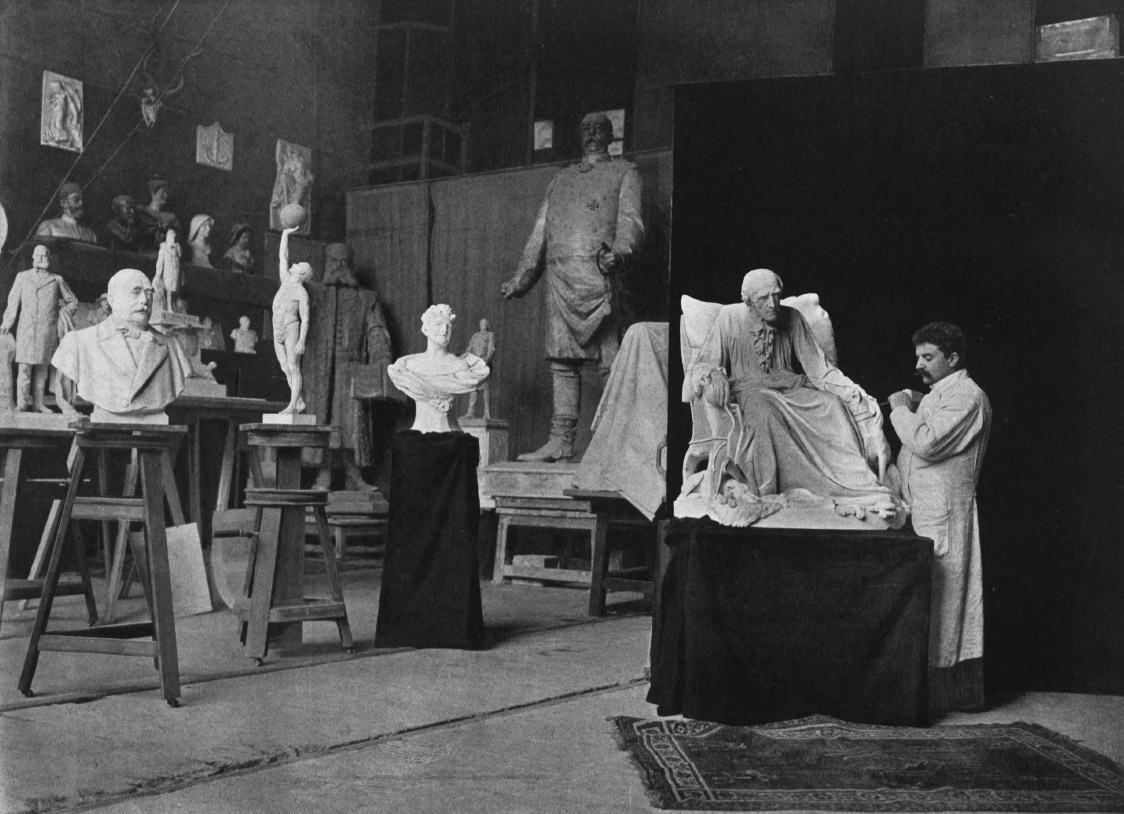
The sculptor Harro Magnussen at work in his workshop; reprinted in 1898 in the Berliner Leben. Zeitschrift für Schönheit & Kunst

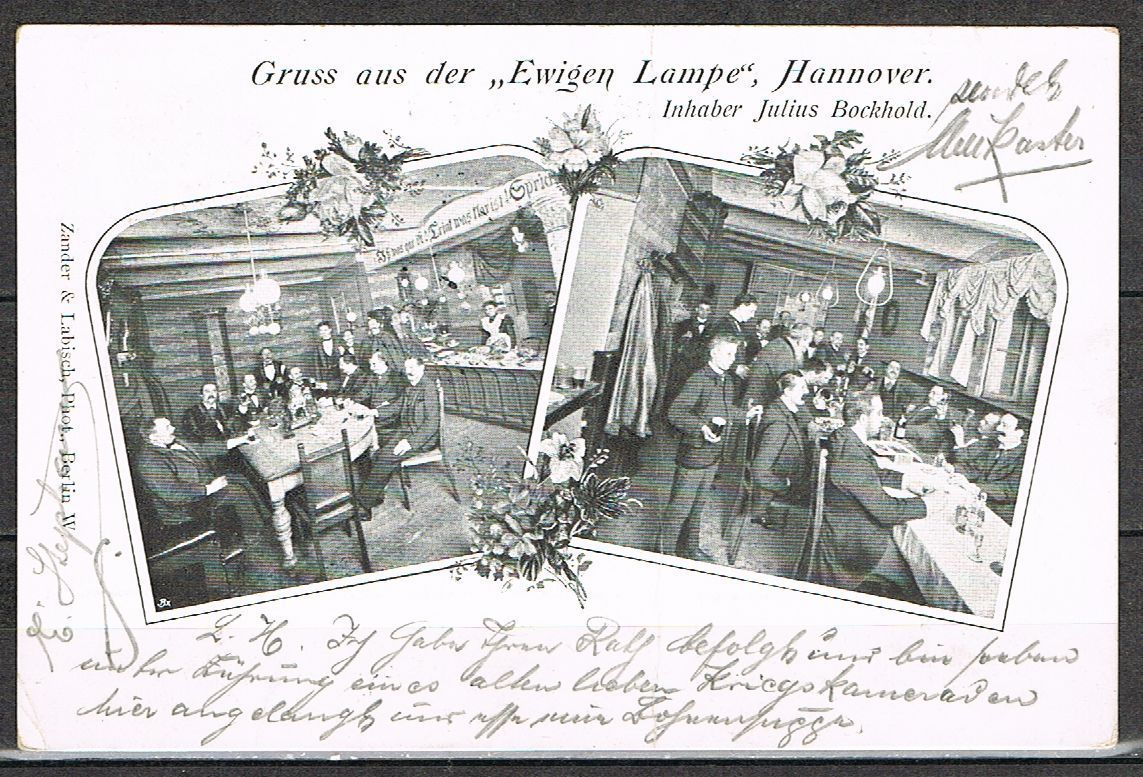
1890s greeting card from the restaurant Ewige Lampe in Hanover

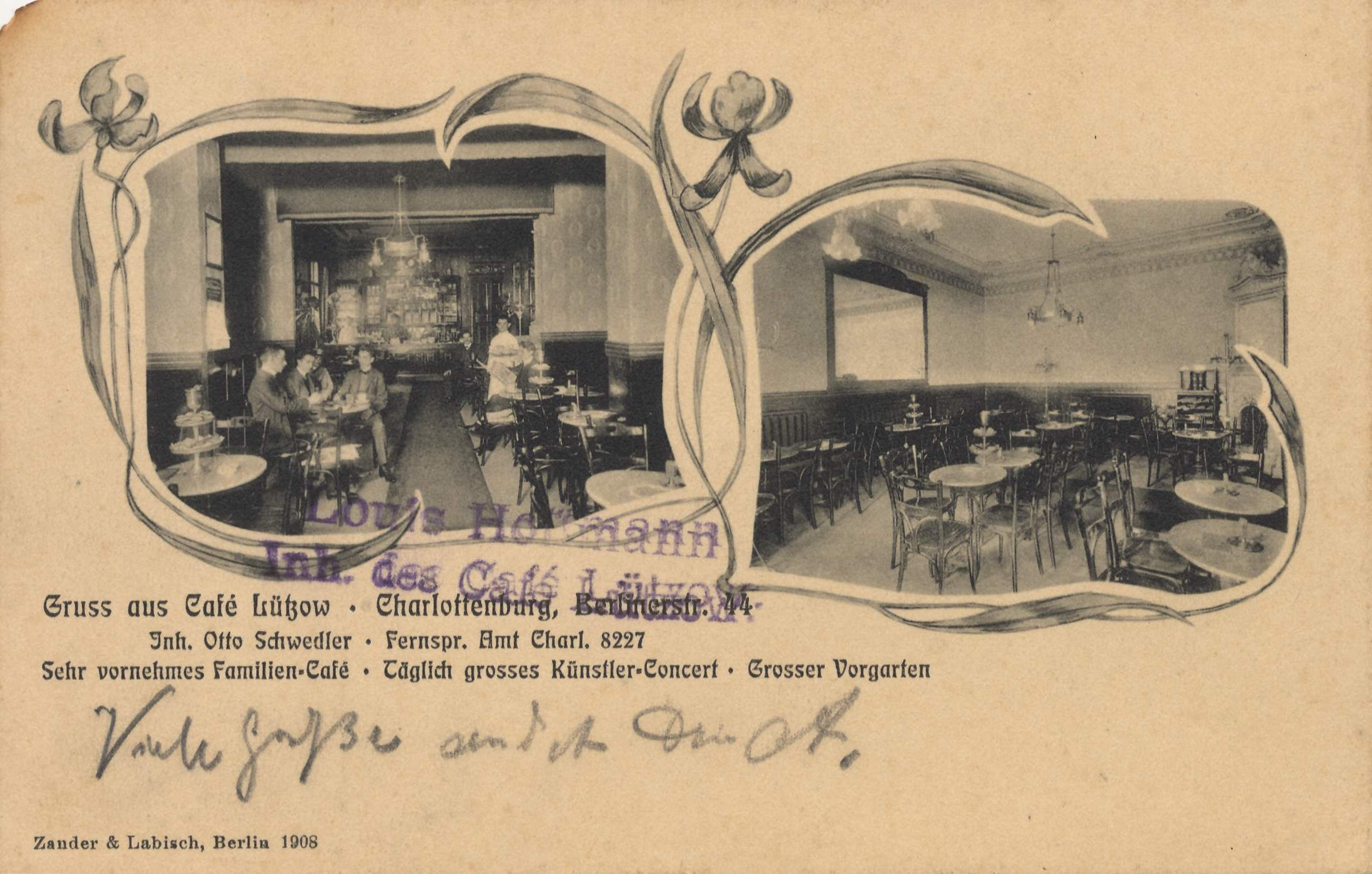
1908 collotype postcard with Jugendstil elements, photography of Café Lützow in Charlottenburg

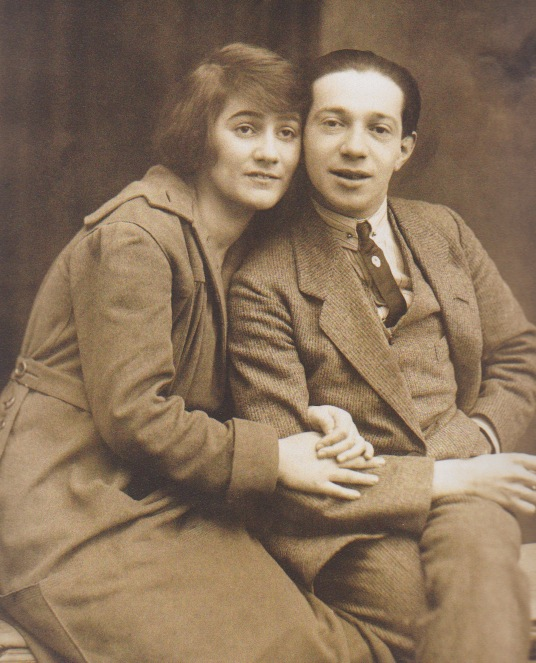
Studio by Blandine Ebinger and Friedrich Hollaender, between 1919 and 1926
