= Waldemar Titzenthaler =

German photographer (1869–1937)

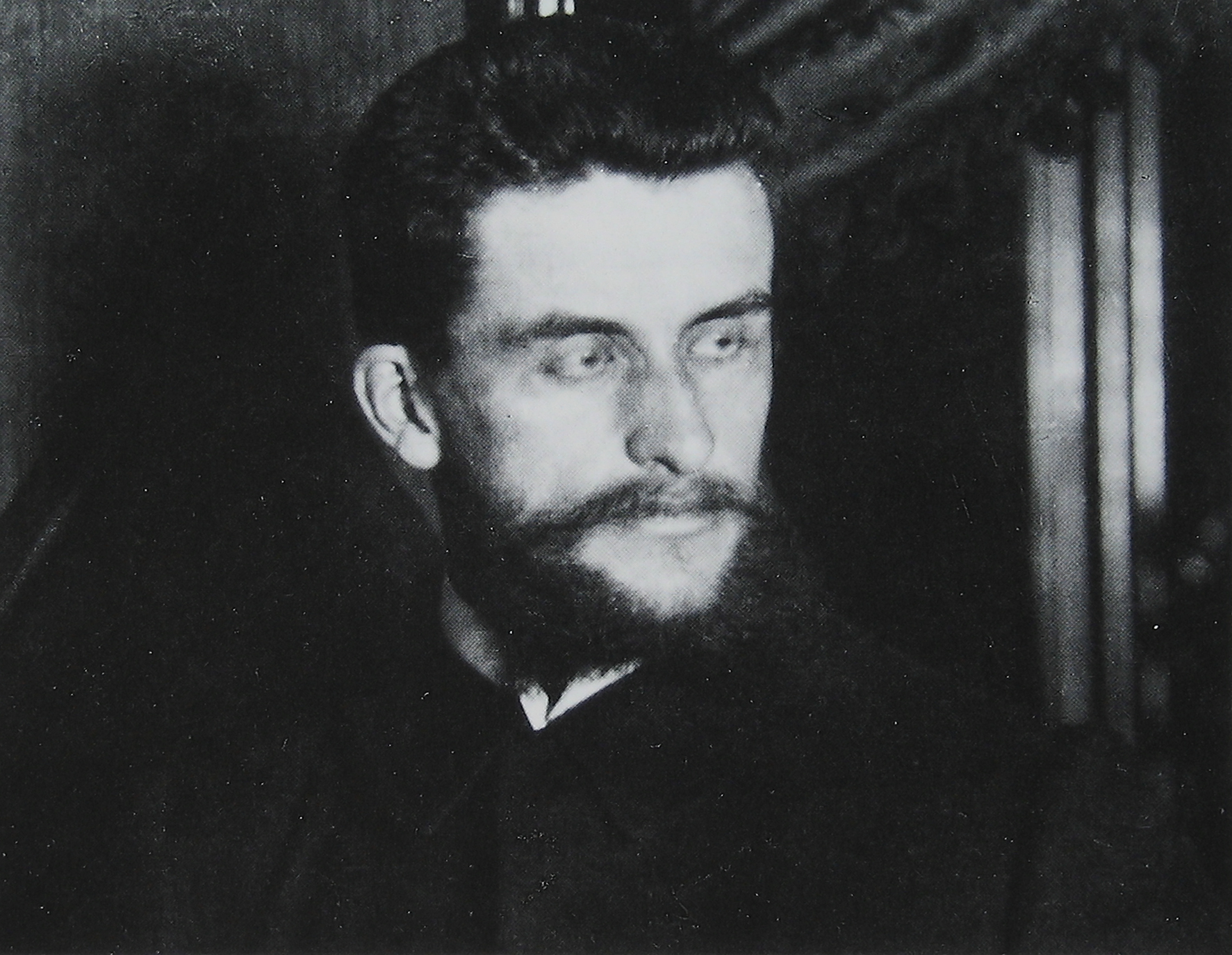
Waldemar Titzenthaler, ca. 1900

Waldemar Franz Hermann Titzenthaler (19 August 1869 – 7 March 1937) was a German photographer.

== Life ==
Titzenthaler was born in Ljubljana, Crown land of Carniola, the son of the Grand Duchy of Oldenburg Court photographer Franz Hermann Titzenthaler from his second marriage to Hermine née Haugk. From 1886 to 1889, he completed an apprenticeship as a photographer with Karl Friedrich Wunder in Hanover. After stays in Oldenburg, Hanover, Berchtesgaden, Leipzig, Lausanne and Königsberg, he finally moved to Berlin in 1896, where he took up a position as a photographer with the Zander & Labisch company, working mainly for the Berliner Illustrirte Zeitung. In 1897, he set up his own photo studio and soon became one of the first German commercial photographers, whose clients included important Berlin companies.

From 1901 he was a member of the Freie Photographische Vereinigung zu Berlin and from 1907 to 1911 chairman of the Photographischer Verein zu Berlin, whose members later appointed him honorary master of their guild. From 1910, he served courts and from 1912 onwards also the IHK Berlin as a sworn expert in photographic matters.

From 1912 to 1931, Titzenthaler worked for the magazine Die Dame, published by Ullstein Verlag, and in this capacity captured the flats of famous actors, singers, directors and architects, among others. Since 1934, he lived in Berlin Lichterfelde.

From 1922/23, Titzenthaler was also chairman of the Berlin section Mark Brandenburg of the Deutscher und Österreichischer Alpenverein. As an advocate of German-national ideology, he was conspicuous for his radical antisemitism. He euphorically welcomed the Seizure of Power by the NSDAP and advocated the incorporation of the "German tribes" in Austria and South Tyrol into the German Reich. In 2003, therefore, the mountain path named after Titzenthaler to the Hochjoch-Hospiz in the farthest Ötztal was renamed the Cyprian Granbichler Memorial Path. A memorial plaque standing on private land, behind which the urn is located, continues to indicate Titzenthaler's final resting place there. An explanatory additional plaque attached by DAV and ÖAV in 2014 was destroyed shortly afterwards by unknown perpetrators and replaced by a new plaque in 2018. This plaque was painted over with brown paint in August 2019. In the early summer of 2020, the grave slab was also removed.

Titzenthaler died in Kronland Carniola at the age of 67.

== The Waldemar Titzenthaler Collection ==
Titzenthaler's widow was able to save part of his photo archive through the Second World War. In the early 1950s, the surviving photographic plates, dating from 1896 to 1920, were acquired by the Berlin State Archives and are now preserved by them. In the Oven and Ceramics Museum Velten you can also see photographs by him. Among his photographs, there are particularly many showing Berlin in the last years of the 19th and the beginning of the 20th century. The photographs, which were taken with both artistic and technical care, are valuable documents of the past.

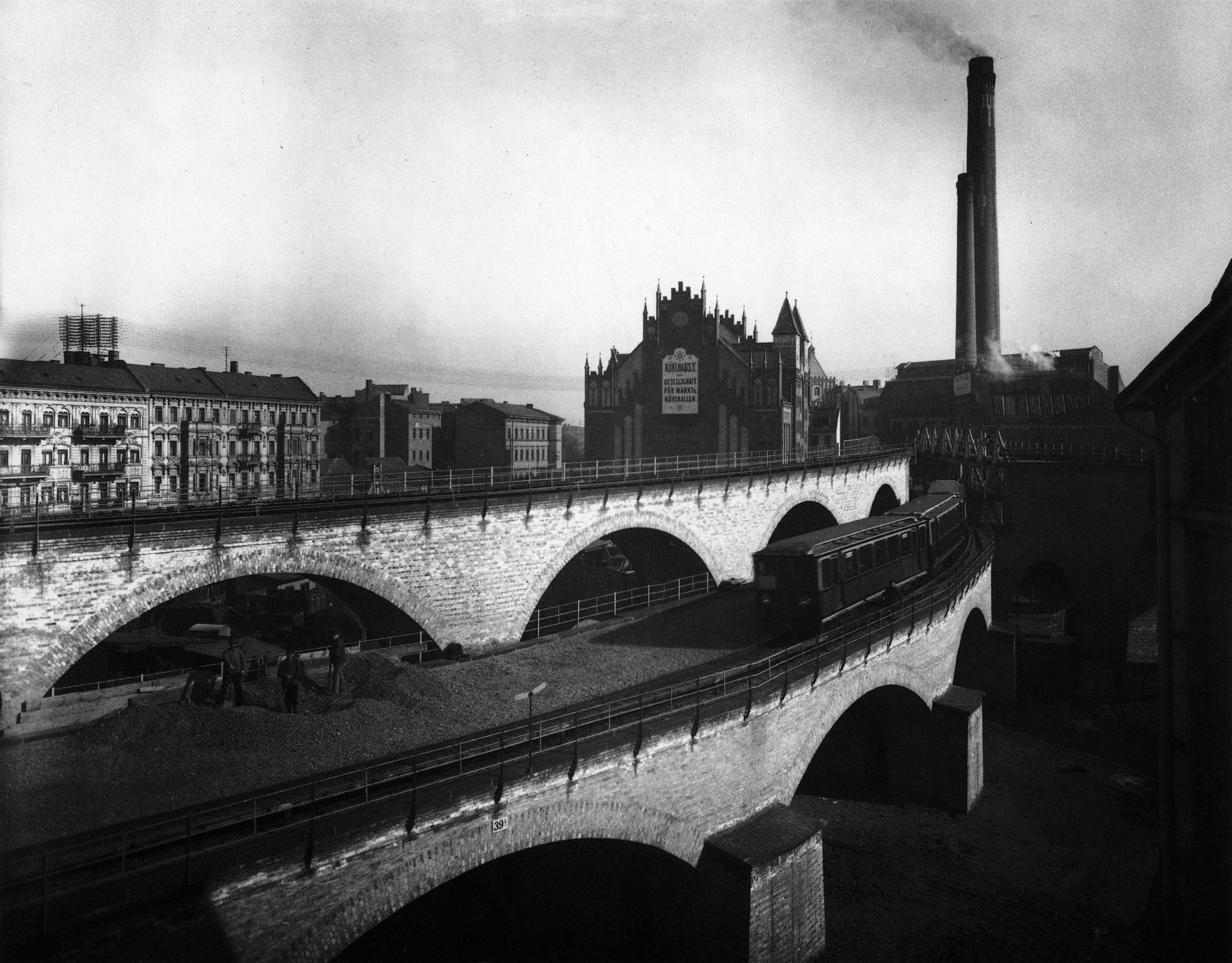
Gleisdreieck in Berlin (1902)

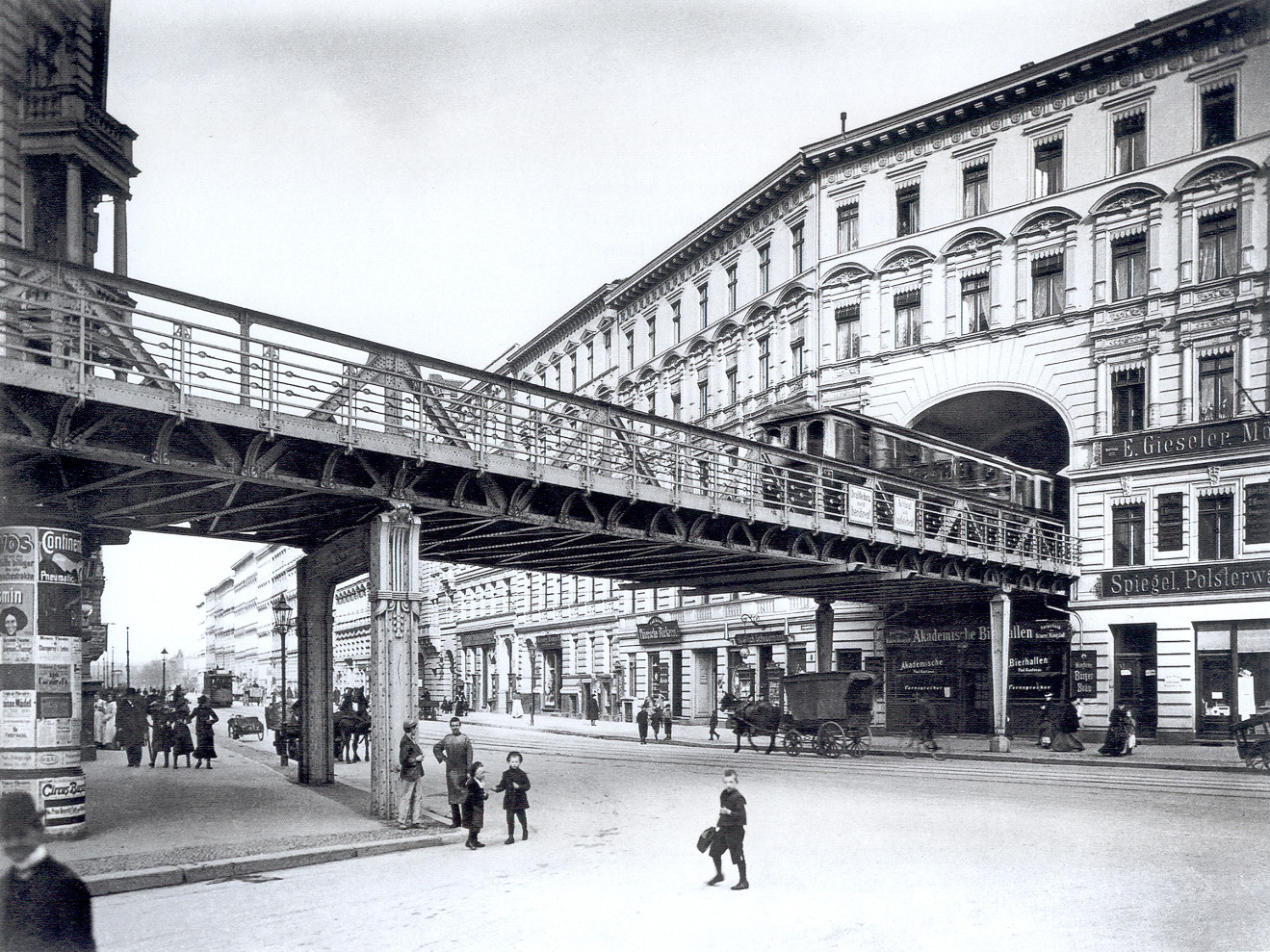
U-Bahndurchfahrt in Berlin's Dennewitzstraße (1905)

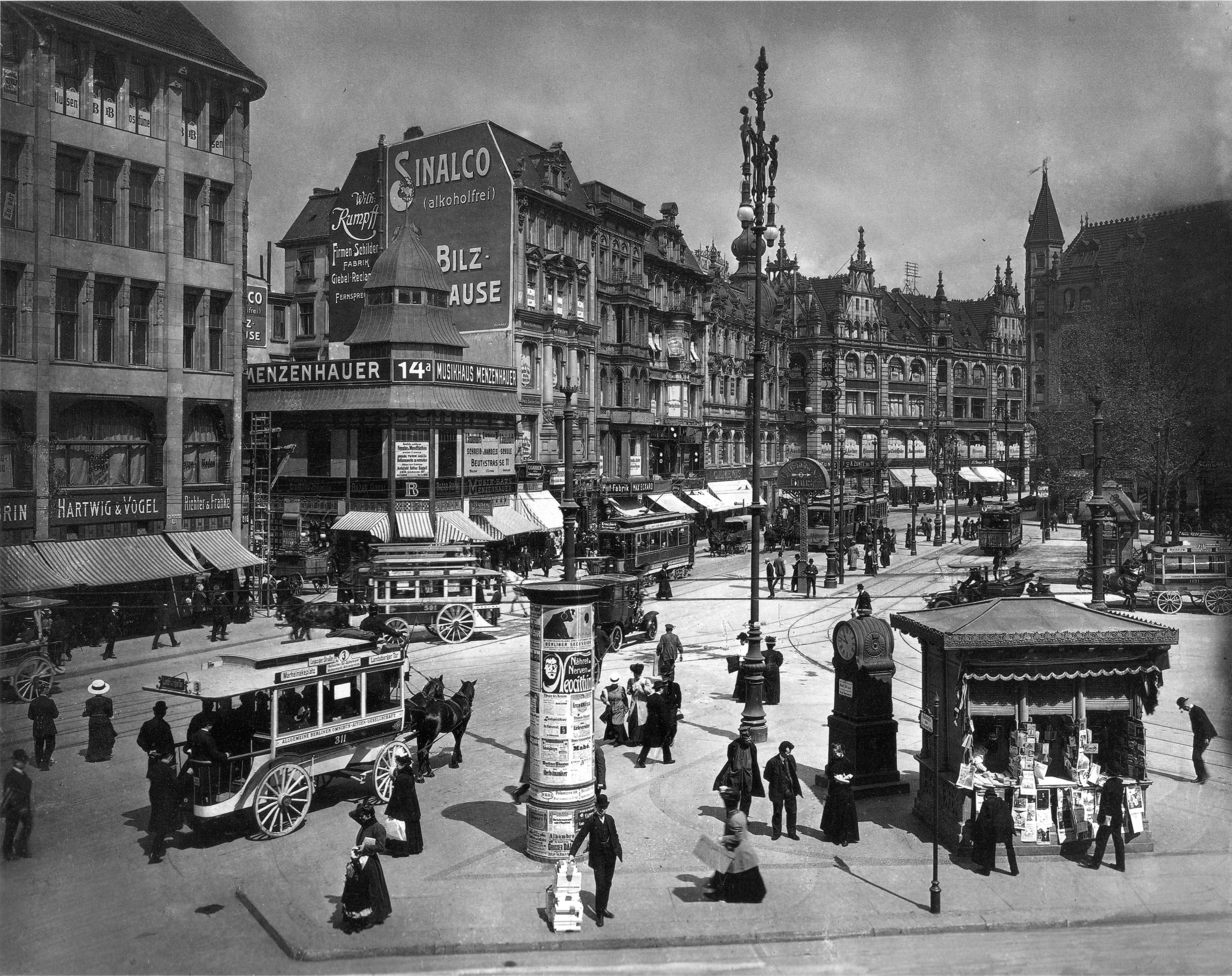
The Spittelmarkt in Berlin (1909)

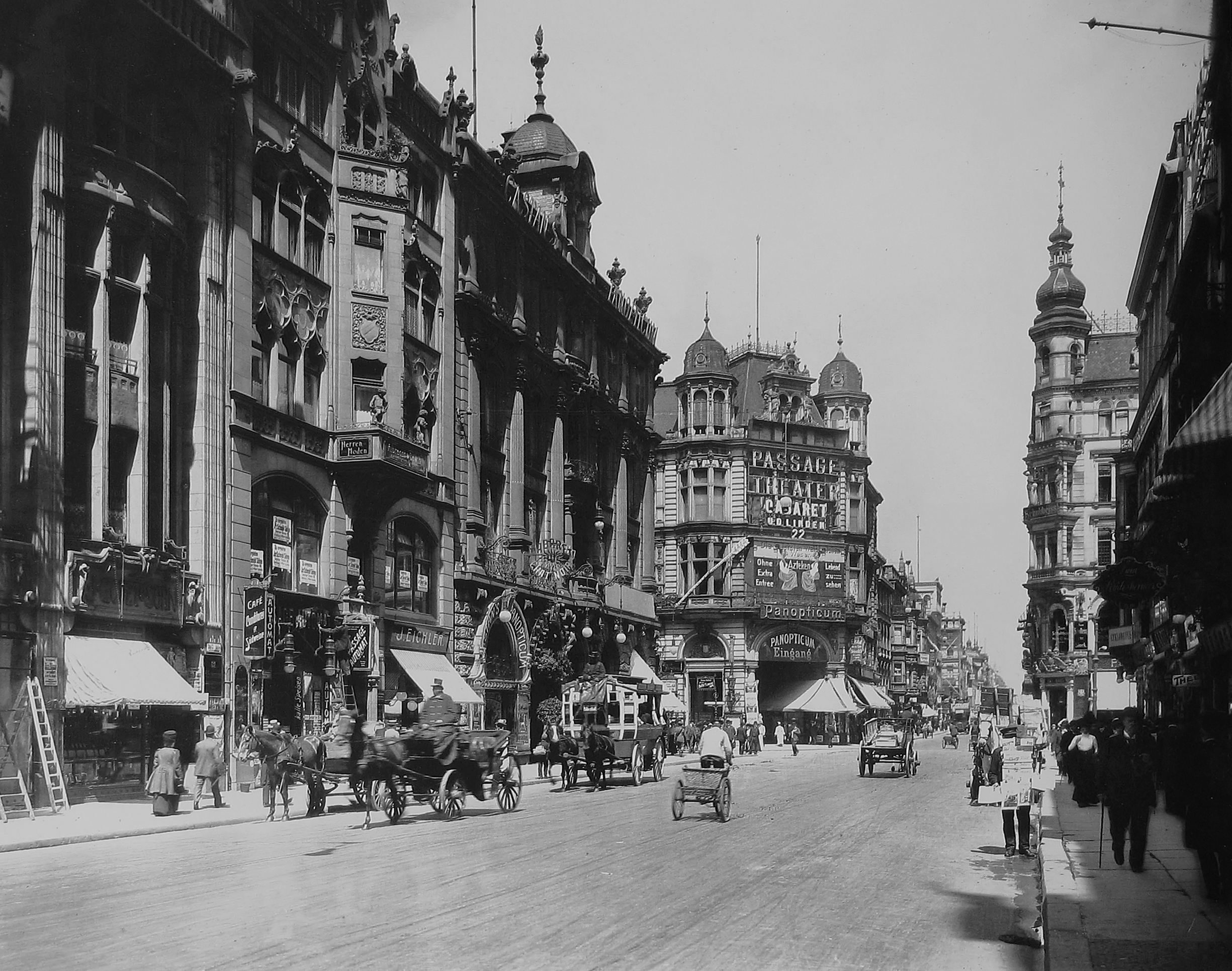
Friedrichstraße in Berlin (1909)

== Exhibitions ==
- Fotografien von Waldemar Titzenthaler: Unterwegs in Deutschland und Europa from 17 October 2008 to 27 February 2009 at the Landesarchiv Berlin
- Titzenthaler – Vier Fotografen, Drei Generationen – 100 Jahre Fotografie, from 29 June to 21 September 2008 at the Landesmuseum für Kunst und Kulturgeschichte Oldenburg
- Ausstellung Schwesternschaftsjahre 1875 bis heute of the DRK-Schwesternschaft Berlin in the Westend DRK clinics with a collection of photographs by Titzenthaler, who photographed nurses and veterans of the First World War.
