= Milcz =

- Village
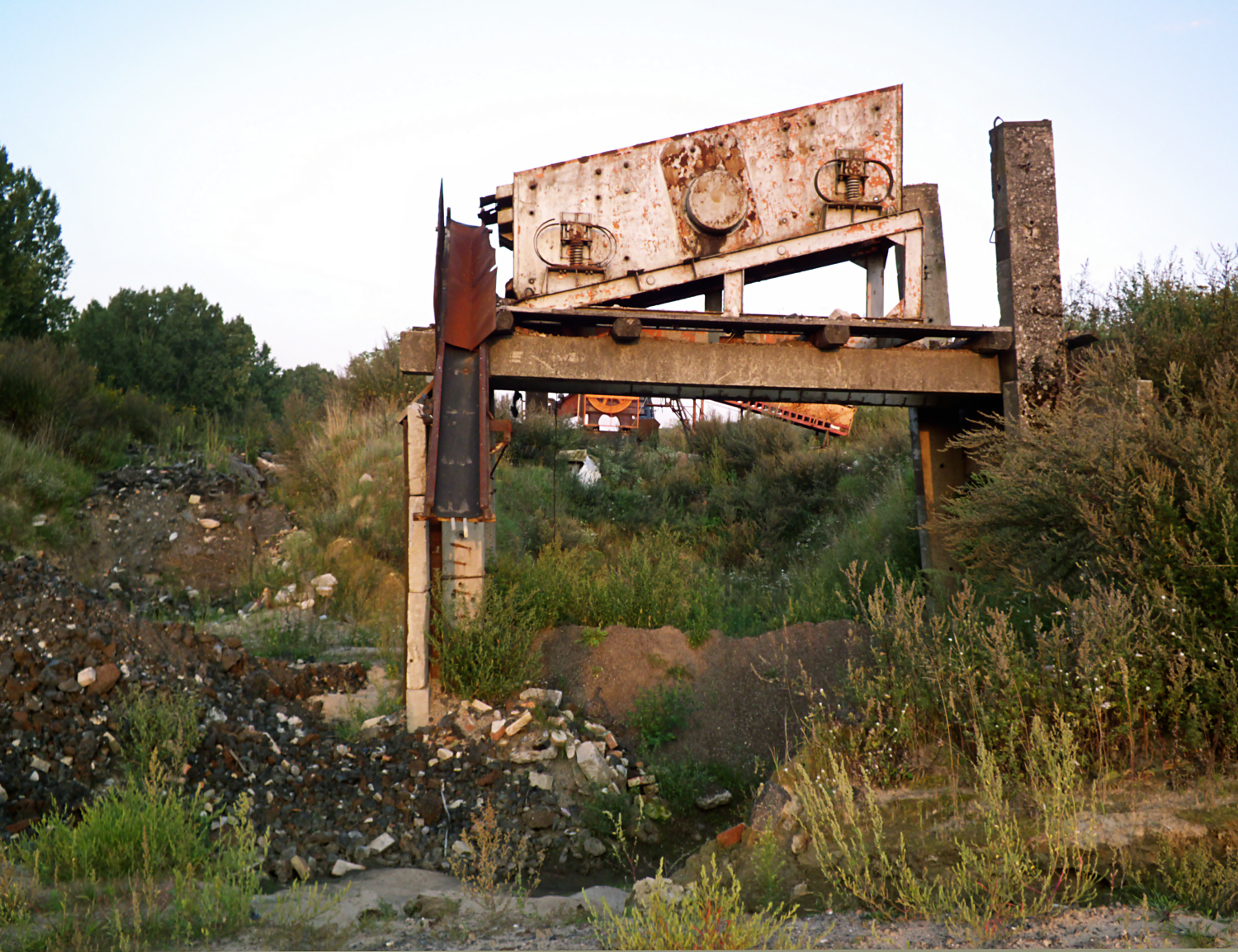

- Location within Poland
- Coordinates: 53°2′35″N 16°51′35″E
- Country: Poland
- Voivodeship: Greater Poland
- County: Chodzież
- Gmina: Chodzież
- Population: 469

Milcz [milt͡ʂ] is a village in the administrative district of Gmina Chodzież, within Chodzież County, Greater Poland Voivodeship, in west-central Poland.
