= Grete Weil =

German writer

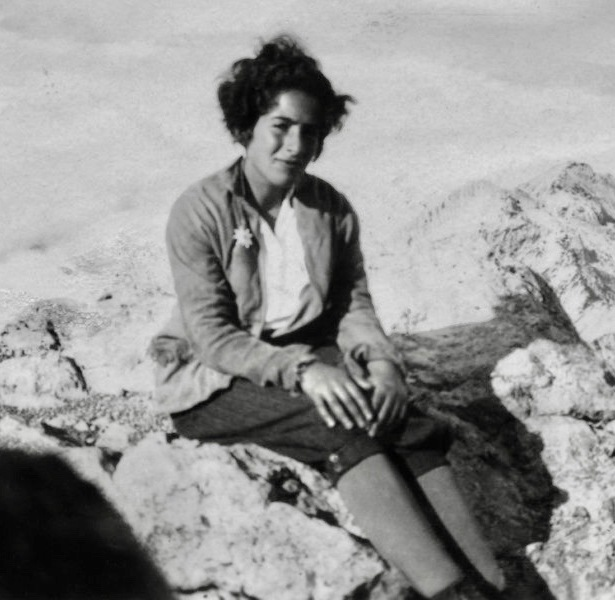
Weil, c. 1932

Grete Weil (18 July 1906 – 14 May 1999) was a German writer.

== Biography ==
She was born Margarete Elisabeth Dispeker, the daughter of a prominent lawyer in Munich. She studied German literature in Frankfurt, Berlin, Munich, and Paris. In 1932, she began writing her dissertation, and also completed her first story, "Erlebnis einer Reise" (Experience of a trip).

In 1932, she married Edgar Weil, a playwright at the Munich Kammerspiele. After the Nazis came to power in Germany in 1933, Edgar lost his position and was also briefly detained by the police. The couple made the decision to emigrate to the Netherlands. Edgar traveled there first, and established a pharmaceutical company, based on his experience with his family's pharmaceutical business in Frankfurt am Main. During this time, Grete broke off her literature studies, and trained as a photographer. In 1935, she followed her husband to Amsterdam, where she operated a photo studio. In June 1941, the year following the occupation of the Netherlands by the Nazis, Edgar was arrested and soon transferred to Mauthausen concentration camp, where he was killed, within just a few months of his arrest. Grete went into hiding and survived the Holocaust.

She returned to Germany in 1947 where she lived at first in Darmstadt, and later in Stuttgart, Berlin, and Hannover. She settled in Frankfurt in 1955. In 1949, her short novel Ans Ende der Welt (To the end of the world), which she had written while still in Amsterdam, was published by an East Berlin publishing company. After that, she wrote librettos for works by Hans Werner Henze (Boulevard Solitude, 1951) and Wolfgang Fortner (Die Witwe von Ephesus, 1952), and worked on a novel, "Antigone," which remained unpublished. To earn a living, Weil also wrote articles for the theater periodical Das neue Forum (Darmstadt), and translated books from English for the Limes publishing house in Wiesbaden.

In 1960, Weil married her longtime friend, the opera director Walter Jockisch, with whom she had been together since her return to Germany. After Jockisch's death, in 1970, Weil increasingly turned to her writing. In 1974, she moved to Grünwald near Munich.

Weil is one of the major proponents of Holocaust literature. Her books have been translated into all the major European languages. Weil was a member of the PEN Centre Germany.

== Awards ==
Among her awards are the Wilhelmine-Lübke-Preis (1980), the Tukan Prize from the city of Munich (1983), the Geschwister Scholl-Preis (1988), the Carl-Zuckmayer Medal of Rhineland-Palatinate (1995) and the Bavarian Order of Merit (1996).

She died in Grünwald in 1999 at the age of 92.

== Works ==
- Ans Ende der Welt, Berlin 1949
- Boulevard Solitude, Mainz 1951
- Tramhalte Beethovenstraat, Wiesbaden 1963
- Happy, sagte der Onkel, Wiesbaden 1968
- Meine Schwester Antigone, Zürich [u. a.] 1980
- Generationen, Zürich [u. a.] 1983
- Der Brautpreis, Zürich [u. a.] 1988
- Spätfolgen, Zürich [u. a.] 1992
- Leb ich denn, wenn andere leben, Zürich [u. a.] 1998
- Erlebnis einer Reise, Zürich 1999
