= Chodzież =

Town in Greater Poland Voivodeship, Poland

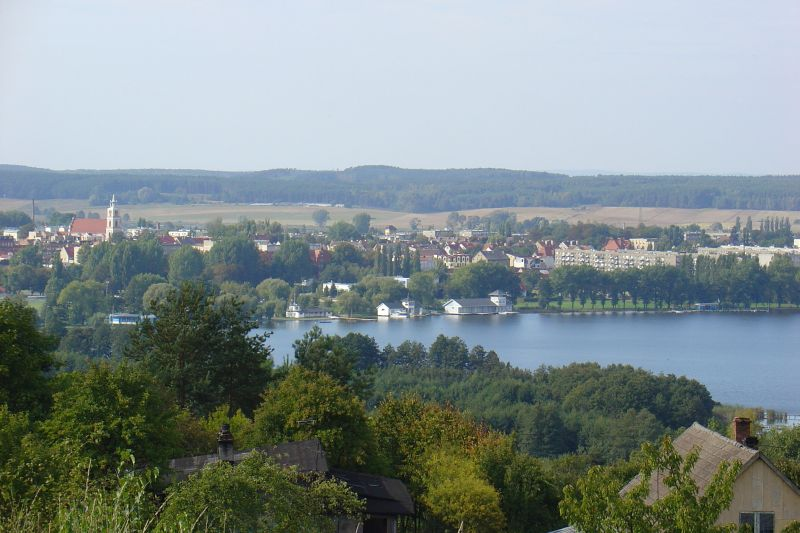
- View of Chodzież

- Flag Coat of arms

- Location within Poland
- Coordinates: 52°59′N 16°54′E
- Country: Poland
- Voivodeship: Greater Poland
- County: Chodzież
- Gmina: Chodzież (urban gmina)
- First mentioned: 1403
- Town rights: 1434

Area
  - Total: 12.77 km^{2} (4.93 sq mi)

Population (31 December 2021)
  - Total: 17,976
  - Density: 1,408/km^{2} (3,646/sq mi)
- Time zone: UTC+1 (CET)
  - Summer (DST): UTC+2 (CEST)
- Postal code: 64-800
- Area code: +48 67
- Vehicle registration: PCH
- Website: http://www.chodziez.pl

Chodzież [ˈxɔd͡ʑɛʂ] is a town in west-central Poland with 17,976 inhabitants as of December 2021, seat of the Chodzież County in the Greater Poland Voivodeship.

== Geography ==
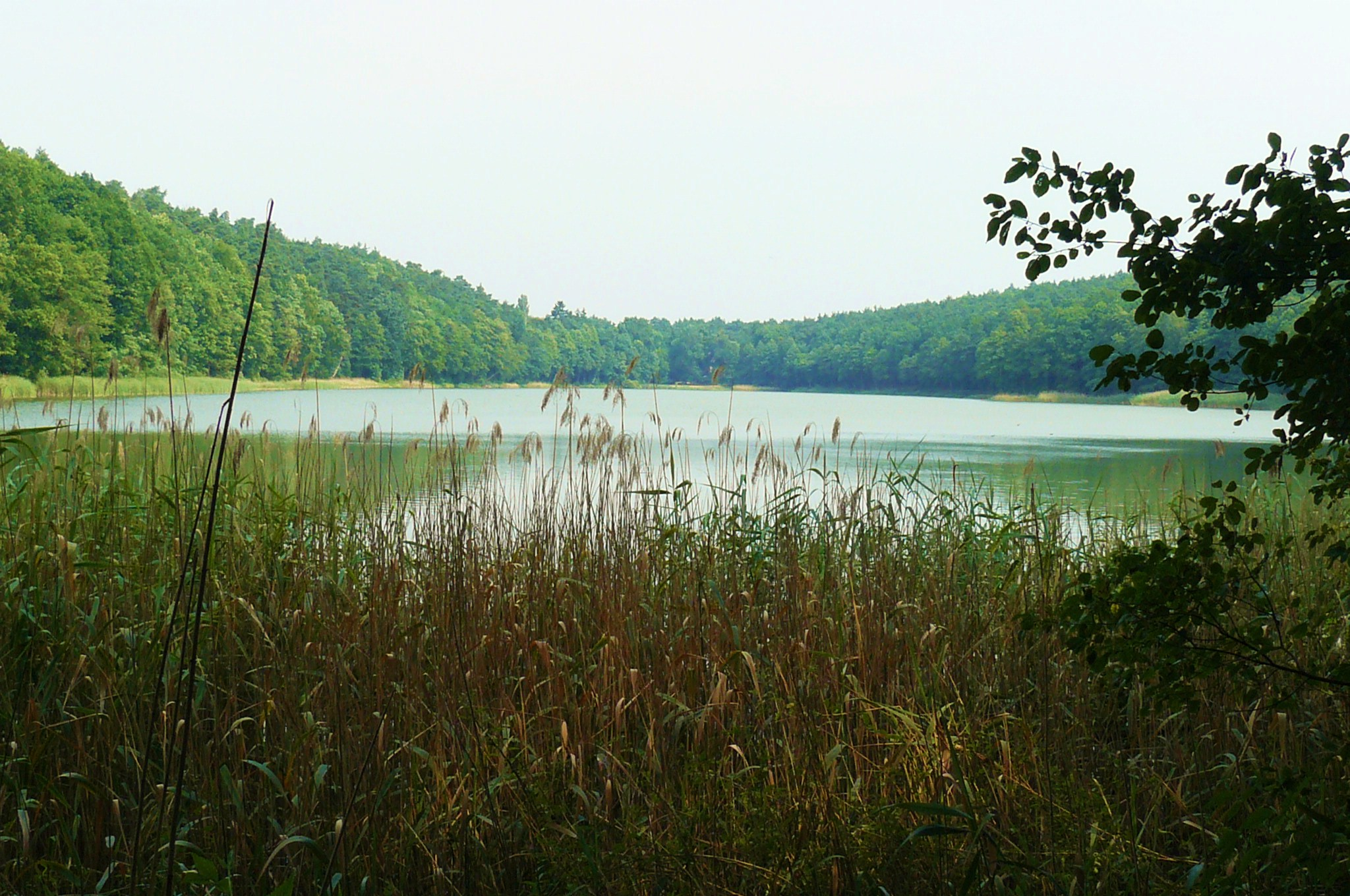
Strzeleckie Lake

Chodzież is located in the northern part of Greater Poland (western Poland), in the Chodzieskie lakelands. The most important characteristics of this lakeland area are its typical postglacial landforms, forests of pines and mixed woodlands, and lakes. For this reason, the city's surroundings are known as "the Switzerland of Chodzież".

Five kilometers west of Chodzież, at the edge of the Chodzieskie lakelands, Mt. Gontyniec rises 192 meters above sea level as the highest peak in a chain of moraine hills; at the same time it has the highest elevation in northern Poland. Deep valleys and ridges covered with a 100-year-old beech forest ensure diversified surroundings.

Within the five square miles (13 km^{2}) of city area, there are three lakes: Miejskie, 1 km^{2} (English: Town lake, 0.4 mile²), Karczewnik, 0.25 km^{2} (0.097 sq mi), and Strzeleckie, 0.18 km^{2} (0.069 sq mi), which make up about 13% of the total town area.

=== Demographics ===
Detailed data as of 31 December 2021:

Description	All		Women		Men	
Unit	person	percentage	person	percentage	person	percentage
Population	17976	100	9425	52.4%	8551	47.6%
Population density	1407.7		738.1		669.6	

Number of inhabitants by year:

Historical population

Year	Pop.	±%
1995	20,295	—
2000	19,792	−2.5%
2005	19,716	−0.4%
2010	19,753	+0.2%

Year	Pop.	±%
2015	19,199	−2.8%
2020	18,229	−5.1%
2021	17,976	−1.4%

== History ==
A burial mound, estimated to date from 2000 B.C., is located in the area of the town where today's Słoneczna street lies. From about 1500 BC, tribes belonging to the Lusatian culture dominated the area for ten centuries. In 1904–1914 two burial grounds were discovered in the area of old Rzeźnicka street, that date to those times. In the early Middle Ages (400–700 AD), a little settlement existed on the south part of Lake Miejskie. Chodzież's beginnings go back at least to the 15th century. First written mention is from 1403. The name Chodzies is mentioned with that of the priest of the local Catholic parish. Researchers believe however, that town roots go back to the 13th century, when it already had its first church.

On 3 March 1434, King Władysław II Jagiello issued a privilege that vested Chodzież with Magdeburg town rights for Trojan of Łękno. For many centuries it was a privately owned city, located within the Kalisz Voivodeship (from 1768 in the Gniezno Voivodeship) in the Greater Poland Province of the Kingdom of Poland. The LÍkiscy–Granowski family were the first owners, then from the mid of the 15th century, Chodzież belonged to the Potulicki family. From 1648 to 1830 the Grudziński family were the owners of Chodzież. The family's Grzymała coat of arms has been the town's crest since that time.

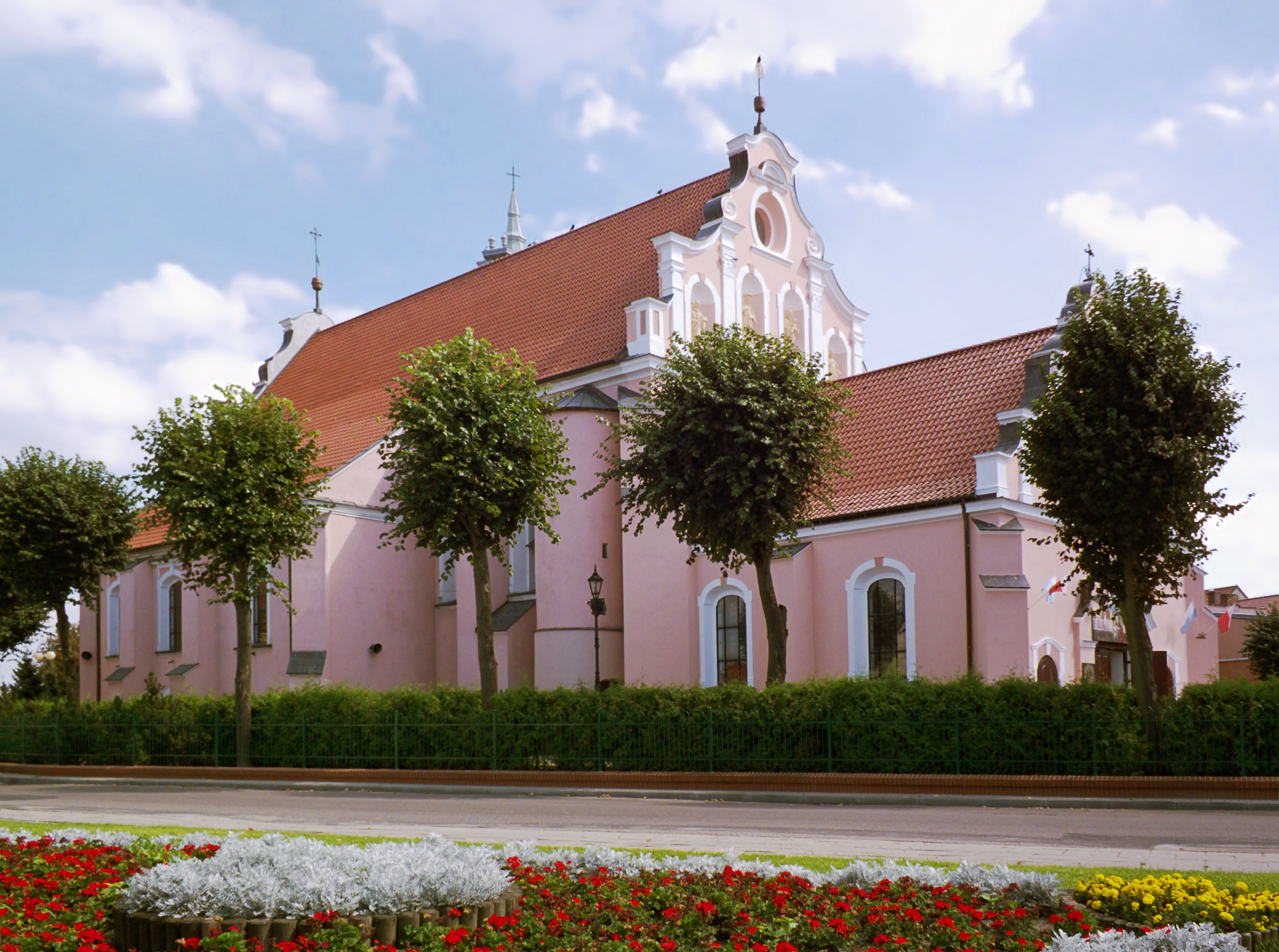
Saint Florian church

St. Florian's church situated at the Market Square, is the oldest monument in Chodzież. Its probable founder was the first owner of the settlement, Trojan of Lekno.

During the 17th century, various parts of Poland were invaded by Swedish troops. The arrival of a group of German clothmakers from Leszno, which had suffered a fire, around 1656, influenced the development of Chodzież. A new town was erected in the mid 18th century, next to the old medieval site in the city, which contained the Market, as the home of weavers and clothmakers. Today, this part of the city (Kościuszki Street) is marked by the characteristic gables of houses situated on narrow, rectangular plots of land. Each lot formerly had wooden sheds in the rear to store wool and cloth.

As the result of the First Partition of Poland in 1772, the town was annexed by the Kingdom of Prussia and became a part of the newly established Netze River District.

In 1805, Chodzież's weavers imported a weaving machine from Berlin. Shortly after, Napoleon defeated Prussia (1807) and out of the Treaty of Tilsit, this part of Poland became part of the Duchy of Warsaw.

In 1815, Prussia and its allies defeated Napoleon, and this area became Prussian again as the Grand Duchy of Posen. It was supposed to be a Polish province within Prussian Kingdom. In reality, it was essentially a Prussian province. In the German language, it has traditionally been known as Chodziesen, after 1879 Kolmar in Posen. This name may be falling into disuse over time, though it can still be found in current use in Germany in some cases.

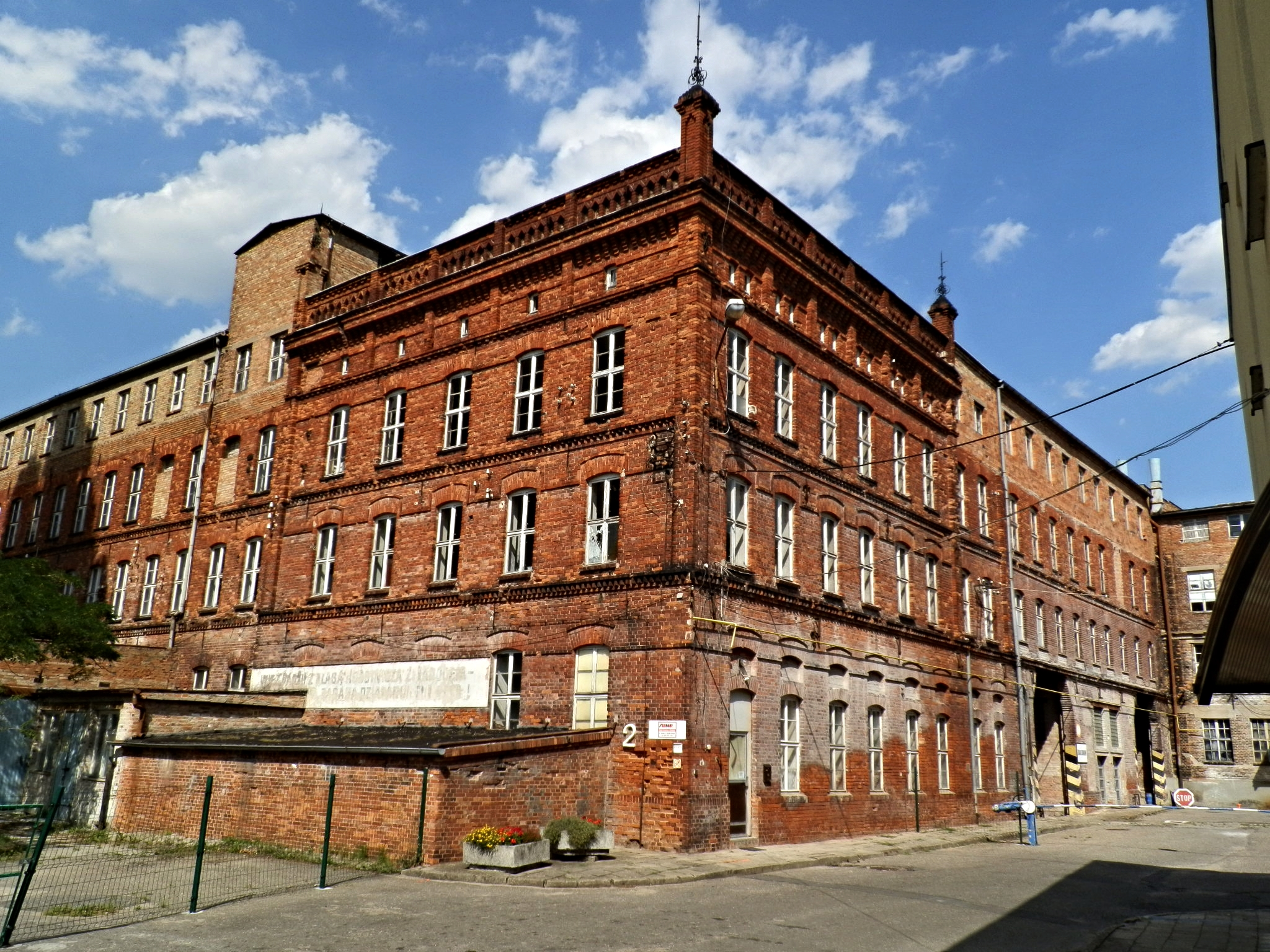
Porcelain factory

The local weaving industry declined about 1812–1815, when a frontier customs post between the Duchy of Warsaw and the Kingdom of Prussia was demarcated. The tariff priced the Posen weavers out of their major eastern markets, so they either migrated to other textile producing areas (e.g. Łódź) or turned to other types of work, like farming.

In 1818, Chodzież became the administrative center of a county-like district (German: Kreis) (see Kreis Kolmar in Posen) that was formed from parts of the following these Kreise: Wirsitz, Wongrowitz, Obornik and Czarnikau (Polish: Wyrzysk, Wągrowiec, Oborniki and Czarnków). Over the years, it gained the character of a local administrative center, which it remained until 1975, when the division of Poland was reorganized into larger units.

In 1849, the Duchy was formalized as the Prussian province of Posen.

Chodzież's important place in the ceramics industry began when two German businessmen, Ludwig Schnorr and Hermann Müller from Frankfurt an der Oder, purchased the ruins of the burned out manor house from Otto Königsmarck in 1855 and built the first faience factory. In 1897 the merchant Hein, a former faience factory owner, built a porcelain factory. Since then, Chodzież has always been an important and significant center of pottery industry.

The German Empire was created in 1871, and in October 1874 a system of civil registration offices were created. Chodziesen was chosen for its area. (See Standesamt Kolmar).

In 1879, the railroad line Poznań — Chodzież — Piła was opened and the name of Chodzież was changed from "Chodzeisen" to "Kolmar in Posen". This name was in honor of Axel von Colmar — Meyenburg, who was extremely influential in the building of the railway, which was beneficial to the town's economy.

=== Interbellum ===
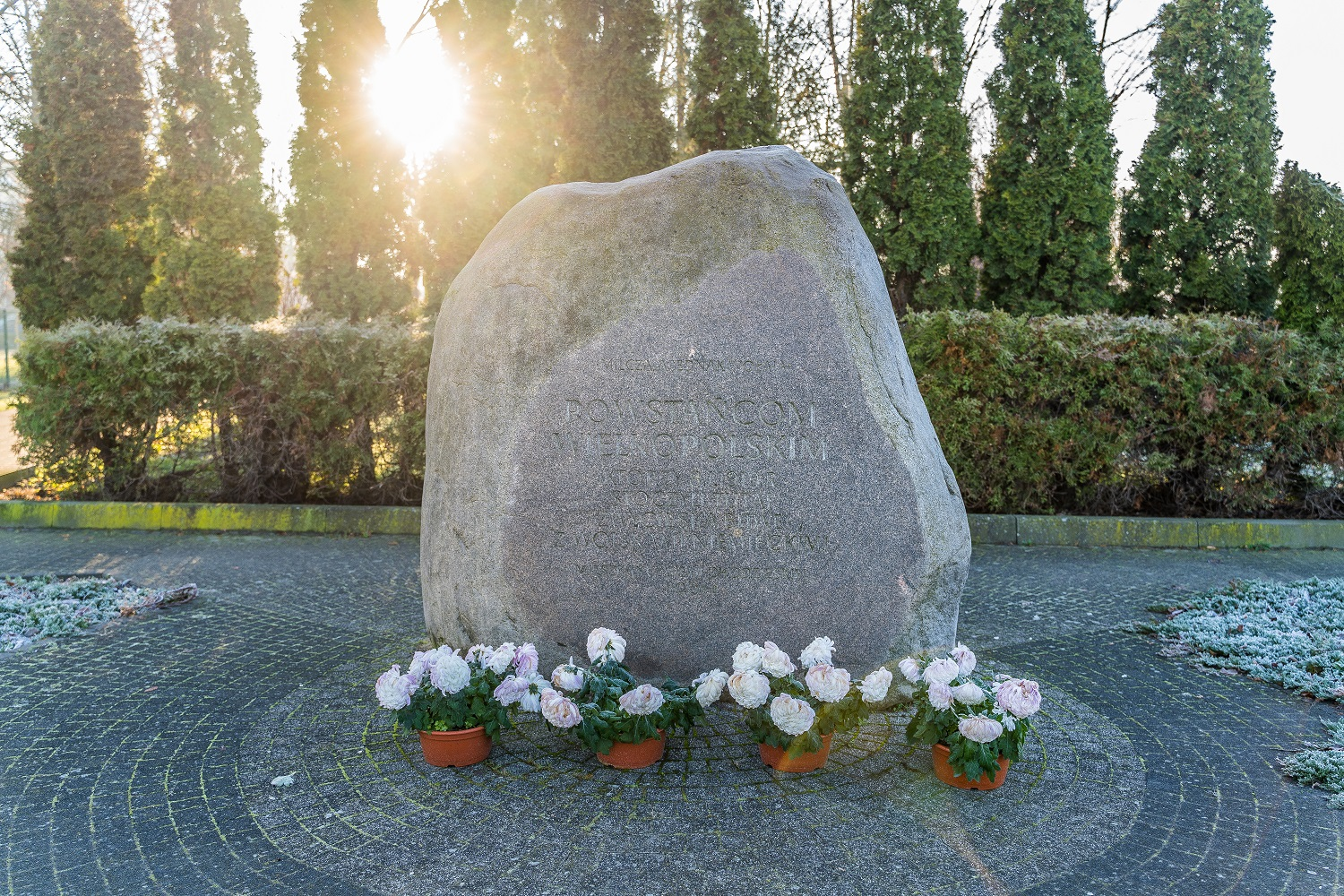
Memorial to the Greater Poland insurgents of 1918–1919

After World War I, Poland regained independence and the Greater Poland Uprising, the aim of which was to reintegrate the region with Poland, spread to Chodzież. Polish insurgents captured the town on January 6, 1919, and then, despite prior agreements, the Germans recaptured it the next day. After bloody fighting the insurgents again captured the town on January 8, 1919. The Versailles Treaty in 1919 eventually confirmed the restoration of Chodzież to Poland. On 19 January 1920, Polish military and political authorities marched into the city and a Polish administration was established. Unemployment and living conditions deteriorated, leading to a wave of strikes, starting in 1921. In the 1930s, the years of the great world economic crisis, workers from Chodzież porcelain factory started a new series of protests. In the period between the two world wars, Chodzież was considered as an important administrative center in the border area between Poland and Germany. It had a working class character, which was related to the development of the faience factory. Since the town was located near the border, 16% of the population was German, while 83% was Polish, as of 1939.

In the 1920s, a tuberculosis sanatorium was established here because of the special climate. It was converted recently into a hospital for railroadmen. In 1921 Stanisław Mańczak bought the porcelain factory from the Annaburger Steinguttfabrik firm.

=== World War II ===
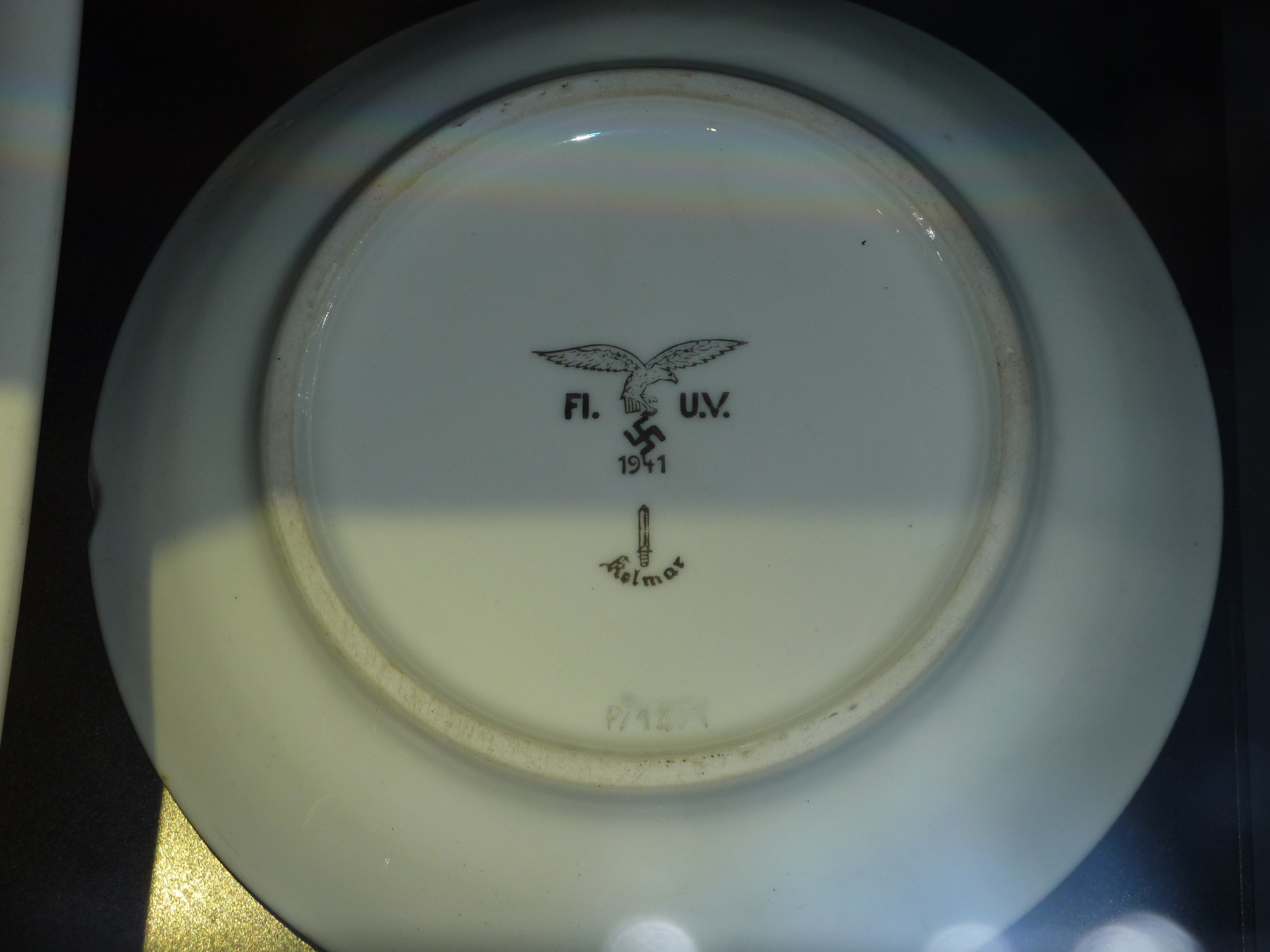
Plate made in German-occupied Chodzież in 1941

In September 1939 the town was invaded by Nazi Germany. Early on, the SS-Totenkopf-Standarte Brandenburg entered the town to commit various atrocities against the Polish population. The German occupation, both in Chodzież and the whole country, was a period of terror directed against Polish citizens. In one notable example, on 7 November 1939, 44 Polish men, including the town's mayor Tadeusz Koppe and the gmina's wójt Marian Weyhan, were killed on the Morzewskie Hills near the village of Morzewo. Germans carried out mass arrests of Poles as part of the Intelligenzaktion, who were then imprisoned in the local prison. Local Poles were also subjected to expulsions and deportations to forced labour in Germany, and a transit camp for Poles expelled from the region was located in the town. Hundreds of Poles were expelled already in December 1939. Houses of expelled Poles were handed over to German colonists as part of the Lebensraum policy, and as a result, Germans formed 56% of the town's populace in 1943. Under Nazi German occupation, the town under the Germanized name Kolmar was made part of Reichsgau Wartheland, and the seat of the county (kreis) of Kolmar. The Rynek (Market Square) was renamed the Adolf Hitler Square.

Despite such circumstances, the Polish resistance movement was still formed and operated in the town and area. Among its local leaders were Marcel Krzycki and pre-war Polish mayor Bronisław Maron. In August 1944, the Germans carried out mass arrests of local members of the Home Army, the leading Polish underground resistance organization. Local Polish resistance leaders were imprisoned and tortured in the local prison and in the Gestapo station in Poznań. Bronisław Maron, his wife, daughter, and Marcel Krzycki were then imprisoned in the Nazi prison camp in Żabikowo (present-day district of Luboń). Bronisław Maron, tortured, died there in 1944, while his wife and daughter were deported to the Ravensbrück concentration camp, where his wife was also murdered. Krzycki's fate is unknown, although he probably also died in Żabikowo. The population of Chodzież during the war years was reduced by almost half.

Liberation came on the night of 22/23 January 1945, when Soviet troops captured the town.

=== Recent period ===
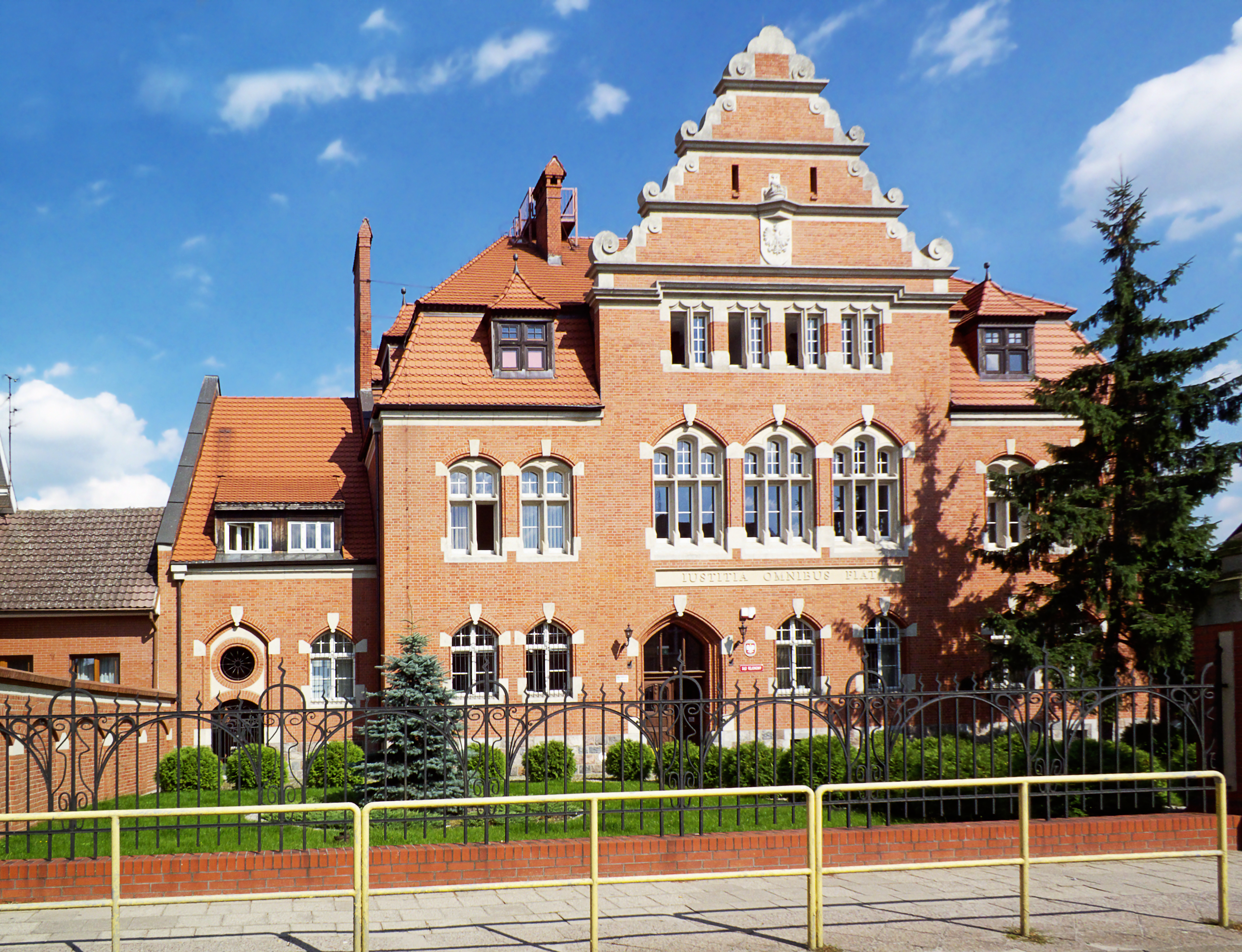
District court

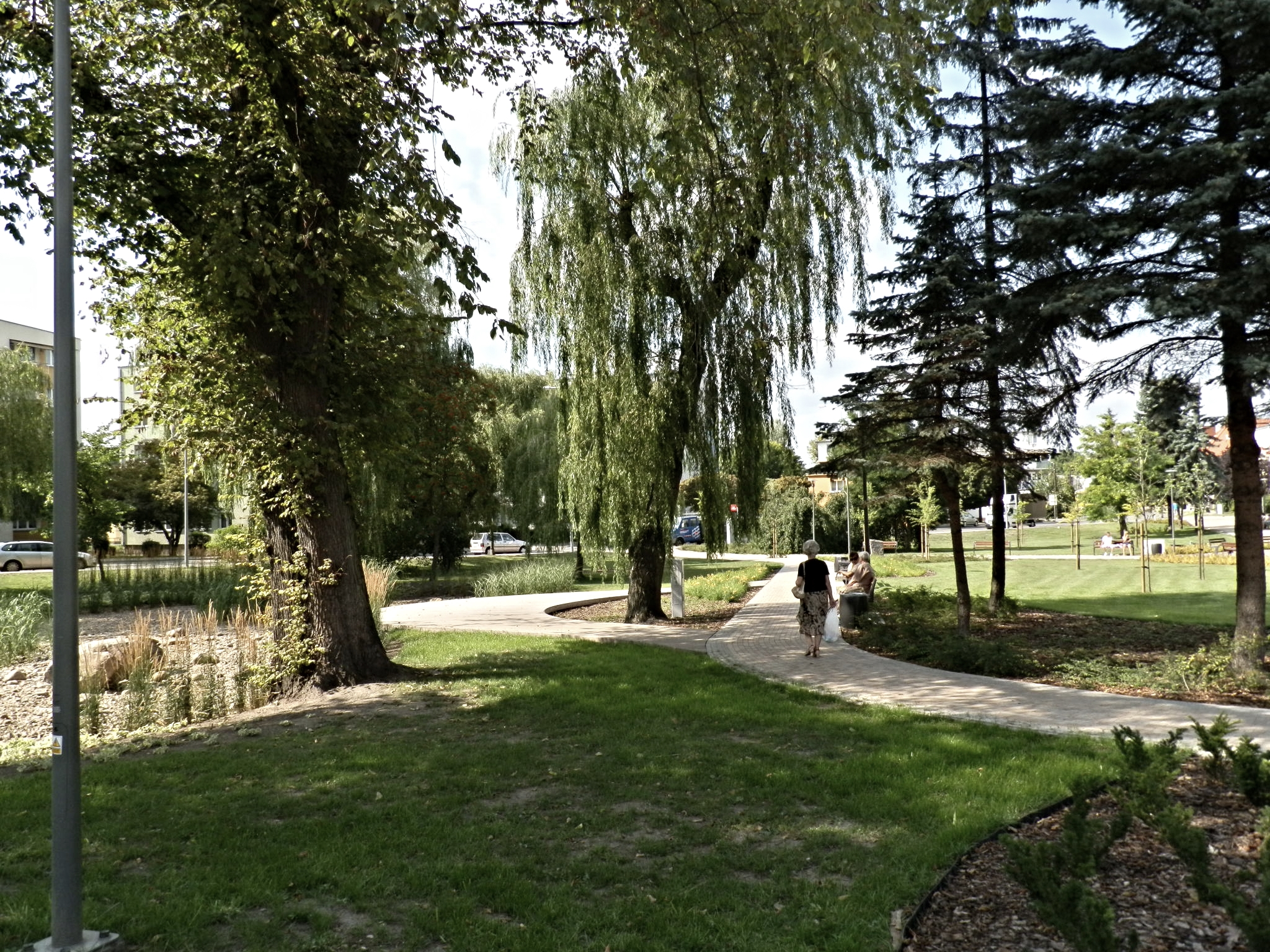
Ostrowski Park

The first years after World War II were a period of restoration and an intensive development of the pottery industry.

In 1946 Chodzież had a population of 7,694. From 1975 to 1998, it was administratively located in the Piła Voivodeship.

The city administration has received prizes and awards on several occasions to recognize the city's cleanliness and aesthetics. In 1974, the city was awarded the title of "the Polish Master of Economics." Later, in 1979, it was awarded the Labor Medal, 1st Class, by the Council of State for the city's achievements in production. The current construction of an urban purification plant will help transform Chodzież into an ecologically clean center for tourism and relaxation. In recent years, the rate of economic development in the city have decreased somewhat, with industry playing a smaller role and the economic development of Chodzież and the region becoming more associated with recreation. Chodzież's natural environment attracts tourists.

== Sports ==
The local football club is Polonia Chodzież, and the athletics club is Gontyniec Chodzież.

The town's sports facilities include an indoor swimming pool, a football stadium and tennis courts. Sailing and motorboat contests take place each year on the municipal lakes. These lakes have European and world-class rank: in 1993, motorboat contests took place in the class 0..350. In addition, every May, the Grzmylita Run promotes sport for the masses.

== Culture ==
A brass orchestra was founded right after the end of the German occupation. First it was connected to the ceramics factory, but currently it works with the Chodzież cultural institute. In the 1970s, the annual jazz workshops began, which allowed new talents to be discovered through encounters between young people and artists from Poland and abroad.

The annual National Children's Song Festivals began in 1991. In 1995, Chodzież was the co-organizer of the XIII National Voluntary Fire Department Brass Orchestra Festival.

== Twin towns ==
- Nottuln, Germany

== People ==
- Trojan of Łękno, chief judge for the province of Kalisz between 1434 and 1450.
- Dagobert Friedländer (1826–1904), Jewish banker and member of the House of Lords of Prussia representing Bromberg.
- Michaelis Machol (1845–1912), rabbi in Cleveland, Ohio from 1879 to 1907
- Hugo Friedlander (1850–1928), mayor of Ashburton, New Zealand 1879–1881, 1890–1892, and 1898–1901.
- Leo Maximilian Baginski (1891–1964), German entrepreneur, inventor and marketing specialist
- Adam Harasiewicz (born 1932), Polish classical pianist
- Zdzisław Szlapkin (born 1961), Polish former Olympic racewalker
