= Masłowo, Piła County =

Masłowo
- Settlement
- Location within Poland
- Coordinates: 53°12′42″N 17°17′19″E
- Country: Poland
- Voivodeship: Greater Poland
- County: Piła
- Gmina: Wyrzysk
- Population: 45

Masłowo (IPA: [maˈswɔvɔ]) is a settlement located in Gmina Wyrzysk, Piła County, Greater Poland Voivodeship, Poland. It is situated about 7 kilometres (4 mi) north of Wyrzysk, 38 km (24 mi) east of Piła, and 94 km (58 mi) north of the regional capital Poznań.
