= Równopole =

- Village
- Location within Poland
- Coordinates: 53°7′N 16°55′E
- Country: Poland
- Voivodeship: Greater Poland
- County: Piła
- Gmina: Kaczory

Równopole [ruvnɔˈpɔlɛ] is a village in the administrative district of Gmina Kaczory, within Piła County, Greater Poland Voivodeship, in west-central Poland.

== Notable people ==
- Lazar Dobricz (1881–1970), Bulgarian circus artist
