= Brzostowo =

Brzostowo may refer to the following places in Poland:

- Brzostowo, Lower Silesian Voivodeship (south-west Poland)
- Brzostowo, Podlaskie Voivodeship (north-east Poland)
- Brzostowo, Greater Poland Voivodeship (west-central Poland)
- Brzostowo, Pyrzyce County in West Pomeranian Voivodeship (north-west Poland)
- Brzostowo, Szczecinek County in West Pomeranian Voivodeship (north-west Poland)
