= Marynka, Greater Poland Voivodeship =

Marynka
- Settlement
- Location within Poland
- Coordinates: 53°12′0″N 17°18′7″E
- Country: Poland
- Voivodeship: Greater Poland
- County: Piła
- Gmina: Wyrzysk

Marynka [maˈrɨnka] is a settlement in the administrative district of Gmina Wyrzysk, within Piła County, Greater Poland Voivodeship. It is situated in west-central Poland.
