= Glesno =

- Village
- Location within Poland
- Coordinates: 53°11′N 17°19′E
- Country: Poland
- Voivodeship: Greater Poland
- County: Piła
- Gmina: Wyrzysk
- Population (approx.): 600

Glesno [ˈɡlɛsnɔ] is a village in the administrative district of Gmina Wyrzysk, within Piła County, Greater Poland Voivodeship, in west-central Poland.

The village has an approximate population of 600.
