= Róża Mała =

- Village
- Location within Poland
- Coordinates: 53°9′30″N 16°29′0″E
- Country: Poland
- Voivodeship: Greater Poland
- County: Piła
- Gmina: Szydłowo
- Population: 300

Róża Mała [ˈruʐa ˈmawa] is a village in the administrative district of Gmina Szydłowo, within Piła County, Greater Poland Voivodeship, in west-central Poland.
