= Leżenica =

- Village
- Location within Poland
- Coordinates: 53°09′12″N 16°31′38″E
- Country: Poland
- Voivodeship: Greater Poland
- County: Piła
- Gmina: Szydłowo
- Population: 172

Leżenica [lɛʐɛˈnit͡sa] (German: Riege) is a village in the administrative district of Gmina Szydłowo, within Piła County, Greater Poland Voivodeship, in west-central Poland.
