= Kłoda, Piła County =

Kłoda
- Village
- Location within Poland
- Coordinates: 53°8′N 16°34′E
- Country: Poland
- Voivodeship: Greater Poland
- County: Piła
- Gmina: Szydłowo
- Population: 122

Kłoda [ˈkwɔda] (German: Kegelsmühl) is a village in the administrative district of Gmina Szydłowo, within Piła County, Greater Poland Voivodeship, in west-central Poland.
