= Tomaszewo, Piła County =

Tomaszewo
- Village
- Location within Poland
- Coordinates: 53°09′12″N 17°07′31″E
- Country: Poland
- Voivodeship: Greater Poland
- County: Piła
- Gmina: Białośliwie

Tomaszewo [tɔmaˈʂɛvɔ] is a village in the administrative district of Gmina Białośliwie, within Piła County, Greater Poland Voivodeship, in west-central Poland.
