= Jeziorki, Piła County =

Jeziorki
- Village
- Location within Poland
- Coordinates: 53°9′N 16°52′E
- Country: Poland
- Voivodeship: Greater Poland
- County: Piła
- Gmina: Kaczory
- Population: 265

Jeziorki [jɛˈʑɔrki] (German: Stüsseldorf) is a village in the administrative district of Gmina Kaczory, within Piła County, Greater Poland Voivodeship, in west-central Poland.

In 2009, a monument was erected to Piotr Konieczka in Jeziorki.
