= Rzadkowo =

- Village
- Location within Poland
- Coordinates: 53°6′N 16°56′E
- Country: Poland
- Voivodeship: Greater Poland
- County: Piła
- Gmina: Kaczory
- Population: 470

Rzadkowo [ʐatˈkɔvɔ] is a village in the administrative district of Gmina Kaczory, within Piła County, Greater Poland Voivodeship, in west-central Poland.
