= Anusin, Greater Poland Voivodeship =

Anusin
- Settlement
- Location within Poland
- Coordinates: 53°8′54″N 17°13′39″E
- Country: Poland
- Voivodeship: Greater Poland
- County: Piła
- Gmina: Wyrzysk

Anusin [aˈnuɕin] is a settlement in the administrative district of Gmina Wyrzysk, within Piła County, Greater Poland Voivodeship, in west-central Poland.
