= Konieczka =

Konieczka, Konieczko, Konieczek are Polish surnames derived from the nicknames Koniec, Konieczka, etc., ultimately from the Polish word koniec. Their archaic feminine form Koniecczanka was also recorded. The word koniec itself has meanings similar to those of the word end end. This personal name was recorded in Poland since at least 1465.

The surnames may refer to:

- Alicja Konieczek, Polish runner
- Aneta Konieczek, Polish steeplechaser
- Piotr Konieczka (1901–1939), Polish soldier
- Corey Konieczka, American board game designer
- Hieronim Konieczka, Polish actor, the namesake of the Hieronim Konieczka Polish Theatre in Bydgoszcz

== Fictional characters ==
- Konieczko, from Polish adult animated comedy series Włatcy móch ("The Lordz o' Flys")
