= Dębówko Nowe =

- Village
- Location within Poland
- Coordinates: 53°7′N 17°11′E
- Country: Poland
- Voivodeship: Greater Poland
- County: Piła
- Gmina: Białośliwie

Dębówko Nowe [dɛmˈbufkɔ ˈnɔvɛ] is a village in the administrative district of Gmina Białośliwie, within Piła County, Greater Poland Voivodeship, in west-central Poland.
