= Nieżychowo =

- Village
- Location within Poland
- Coordinates: 53°9′N 17°10′E
- Country: Poland
- Voivodeship: Greater Poland
- County: Piła
- Gmina: Białośliwie

Nieżychowo [ɲɛʐɨˈxɔvɔ] is a village in the administrative district of Gmina Białośliwie, within Piła County, Greater Poland Voivodeship, in west-central Poland.
