= Wilanowiec =

- Settlement
- Location within Poland
- Coordinates: 53°3′22″N 16°40′32″E
- Country: Poland
- Voivodeship: Greater Poland
- County: Piła
- Gmina: Ujście
- Population: 0

Wilanowiec [vilaˈnɔvjɛt͡s] is a former settlement in the administrative district of Gmina Ujście, within Piła County, Greater Poland Voivodeship, in west-central Poland.

In 1934 the settlement had a population of 37.
