= Klesnik =

Klesnik may refer to the following places in Poland:

- Kleśnik, Pomeranian Voivodeship
- Klęśnik, Greater Poland Voivodeship
