= Nowe Bielawy =

- Settlement
- Location within Poland
- Coordinates: 53°10′52″N 17°19′42″E
- Country: Poland
- Voivodeship: Greater Poland
- County: Piła
- Gmina: Wyrzysk

Nowe Bielawy [ˈnɔvɛ bjɛˈlavɨ] is a settlement in the administrative district of Gmina Wyrzysk, within Piła County, Greater Poland Voivodeship, in west-central Poland.
