= Róża Wielka =

- Village
- Location within Poland
- Coordinates: 53°8′N 16°28′E
- Country: Poland
- Voivodeship: Greater Poland
- County: Piła
- Gmina: Szydłowo
- Population: 550

Róża Wielka [ˈruʐa ˈvjɛlka] (German: Rose) is a village in the administrative district of Gmina Szydłowo, within Piła County, Greater Poland Voivodeship, in west-central Poland.

Before 1772 the area was part of Kingdom of Poland, 1772-1945 Prussia and Germany.
