= Ruda, Piła County =

Ruda
- Village
- Location within Poland
- Coordinates: 53°9′12″N 17°19′25″E
- Country: Poland
- Voivodeship: Greater Poland
- County: Piła
- Gmina: Wyrzysk

Ruda [ˈruda] is a village in the administrative district of Gmina Wyrzysk, within Piła County, Greater Poland Voivodeship, in west-central Poland.
