= Nowy Dwór, Piła County =

Nowy Dwór
- Village
- Location within Poland
- Coordinates: 53°10′09″N 16°31′12″E
- Country: Poland
- Voivodeship: Greater Poland
- County: Piła
- Gmina: Szydłowo
- Population: 279

Nowy Dwór [ˈnɔvɨ ˈdvur] (German: Neuhof) is a village in the administrative district of Gmina Szydłowo, within Piła County, Greater Poland Voivodeship, in west-central Poland.
