= Kruszewo, Greater Poland Voivodeship =

Kruszewo
- Village
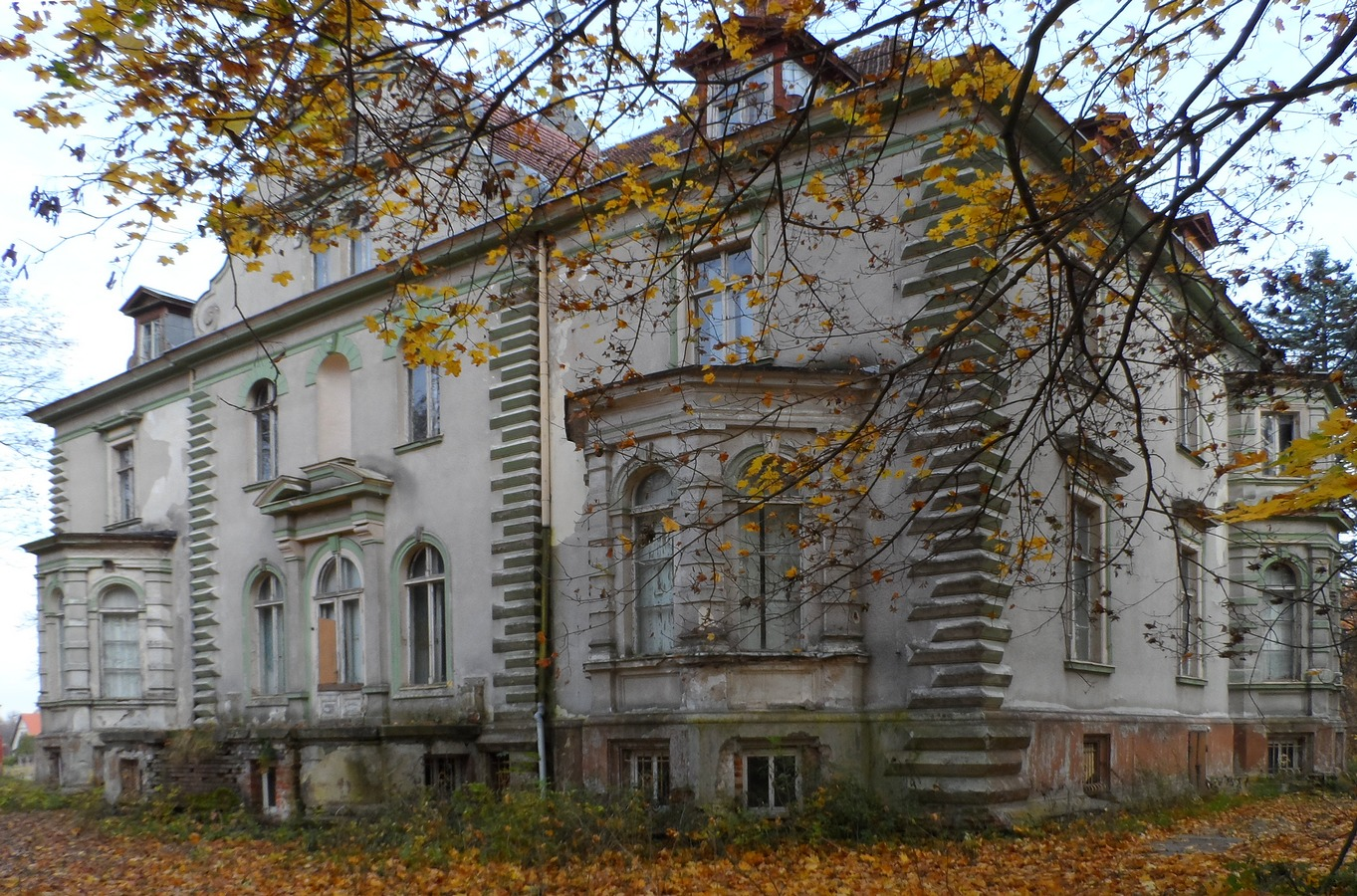
- Palace in Kruszewo

- Location within Poland
- Coordinates: 52°58′19″N 16°39′36″E
- Country: Poland
- Voivodeship: Greater Poland
- County: Piła
- Gmina: Ujście
- Population: 889

Kruszewo [kruˈʂɛvɔ] is a village in the administrative district of Gmina Ujście, within Piła County, Greater Poland Voivodeship, in west-central Poland.
