= Kosztowo =

- Village
- Location within Poland
- Coordinates: 53°10′N 17°12′E
- Country: Poland
- Voivodeship: Greater Poland
- County: Piła
- Gmina: Wyrzysk

Kosztowo [kɔʂˈtɔvɔ] is a village in the administrative district of Gmina Wyrzysk, within Piła County, Greater Poland Voivodeship, in west-central Poland.
