= Hercowo =

- Village
- Location within Poland
- Coordinates: 53°12′3″N 17°16′42″E
- Country: Poland
- Voivodeship: Greater Poland
- County: Piła
- Gmina: Wyrzysk
- Population: 22

Hercowo [xɛrˈt͡sɔvɔ] is a village in the administrative district of Gmina Wyrzysk, within Piła County, Greater Poland Voivodeship, in west-central Poland.
