= Coch PGR =

- Village
- Location within Poland
- Coordinates: 53°11′54″N 16°33′48″E
- Country: Poland
- Voivodeship: Greater Poland
- County: Piła
- Gmina: Szydłowo
- Population: 120

Coch PGR is a village in the administrative district of Gmina Szydłowo, within Piła County, Greater Poland Voivodeship, in west-central Poland.

== See also ==
- State Agricultural Farm — PGR in Polish
