= Płytnica =

Płytnica may refer to:

- Płytnica, Piła County, Poland
- Płytnica, Złotów County, Poland
