= Kościerzyn Wielki =

- Village
- Location within Poland
- Coordinates: 53°12′39″N 17°15′34″E
- Country: Poland
- Voivodeship: Greater Poland
- County: Piła
- Gmina: Wyrzysk
- Population: 373

Kościerzyn Wielki (Polish pronunciation: [kɔɕˈtɕɛʐɨn ˈvjɛlkʲi]) is a village in the administrative district of Gmina Wyrzysk, within Piła County, Greater Poland Voivodeship, in west-central Poland.
