= Ujście-Łęg =

- Settlement
- Location within Poland
- Coordinates: 53°2′28″N 16°38′25″E
- Country: Poland
- Voivodeship: Greater Poland
- County: Piła
- Gmina: Ujście

Ujście-Łęg [ˈui̯ɕt͡ɕɛ ˈwɛnk] is a settlement in the administrative district of Gmina Ujście, within Piła County, Greater Poland Voivodeship, in west-central Poland.
