= Leśny Dworek =

- Village
- Location within Poland
- Coordinates: 53°7′8″N 16°34′50″E
- Country: Poland
- Voivodeship: Greater Poland
- County: Piła
- Gmina: Szydłowo

Leśny Dworek [ˈlɛɕnɨ ˈdvɔrɛk] is a village in the administrative district of Gmina Szydłowo, within Piła County, Greater Poland Voivodeship, in west-central Poland.
