= Polinowo =

- Village
- Location within Poland
- Coordinates: 53°11′15″N 17°15′49″E
- Country: Poland
- Voivodeship: Greater Poland
- County: Piła
- Gmina: Wyrzysk
- Population: 110

Polinowo [pɔliˈnɔvɔ] is a village in the administrative district of Gmina Wyrzysk, within Piła County, Greater Poland Voivodeship, in west-central Poland.
