= Furman, Poland =

Furman
- Settlement
- Location within Poland
- Coordinates: 53°10′35″N 16°34′0″E
- Country: Poland
- Voivodeship: Greater Poland
- County: Piła
- Gmina: Szydłowo

Furman [ˈfurman] is a settlement in the administrative district of Gmina Szydłowo, within Piła County, Greater Poland Voivodeship, in west-central Poland.
