= Cyk =

Cyk or CYK may refer to:

- CYK algorithm, a grammar-related algorithm
- Cyk, Greater Poland Voivodeship (west-central Poland)
- Cyk, Masovian Voivodeship (east-central Poland)
- Çük, a Tatar holiday
- CYK, the National Rail station code for Clydebank railway station, West Dunbartonshire, Scotland
