= Dąbrowa-Kolonia, Greater Poland Voivodeship =

Dąbrowa-Kolonia
- Settlement
- Location within Poland
- Coordinates: 53°11′20″N 16°36′10″E
- Country: Poland
- Voivodeship: Greater Poland
- County: Piła
- Gmina: Szydłowo

Dąbrowa-Kolonia [dɔmˈbrɔva kɔˈlɔɲa] is a settlement in the administrative district of Gmina Szydłowo, within Piła County, Greater Poland Voivodeship, in west-central Poland.
