= Żelazno, Piła County =

Żelazno
- Village
- Location within Poland
- Coordinates: 53°8′N 17°21′E
- Country: Poland
- Voivodeship: Greater Poland
- County: Piła
- Gmina: Wyrzysk

Żelazno [ʐɛˈlaznɔ] is a village in the administrative district of Gmina Wyrzysk, within Piła County, Greater Poland Voivodeship, in west-central Poland.
