= Wolsko =

- Village
- Location within Poland
- Coordinates: 53°6′N 17°3′E
- Country: Poland
- Voivodeship: Greater Poland
- County: Piła
- Gmina: Miasteczko Krajeńskie

Wolsko [ˈvɔlskɔ] is a village in the administrative district of Gmina Miasteczko Krajeńskie, within Piła County, Greater Poland Voivodeship, in west-central Poland.
