= Pobórka Wielka =

- Village
- Location within Poland
- Coordinates: 53°8′N 17°6′E
- Country: Poland
- Voivodeship: Greater Poland
- County: Piła
- Gmina: Białośliwie
- Time zone: UTC+1 (CET)
  - Summer (DST): UTC+2 (CEST)

Pobórka Wielka [pɔˈburka ˈvjɛlka] is a village in the administrative district of Gmina Białośliwie, within Piła County, Greater Poland Voivodeship, in west-central Poland.

During the German occupation of Poland during World War II, some Polish inhabitants of Pobórka Wielka, were murdered by the Germans on the slope of the Góra Wysoka hill in nearby Wysoka in two mass executions on October 21 and November 21 (see Nazi crimes against the Polish nation).
