= Czaplino =

Czaplino may refer to:

- Czaplino, Podlaskie Voivodeship, a village in Białystok County, Poland
- Czaplino, Greater Poland Voivodeship, a settlement in Piła County, Poland
