= Nowie =

Nowie may refer to:

- Nowie, Victoria, Australia
- Nowie, Poland
