= Pobórka Mała =

- Village
- Location within Poland
- Coordinates: 53°8′N 17°6′E
- Country: Poland
- Voivodeship: Greater Poland
- County: Piła
- Gmina: Białośliwie

Pobórka Mała [pɔˈburka ˈmawa] is a village in the administrative district of Gmina Białośliwie, within Piła County, Greater Poland Voivodeship, in west-central Poland.
