= Ługi Ujskie =

- Village
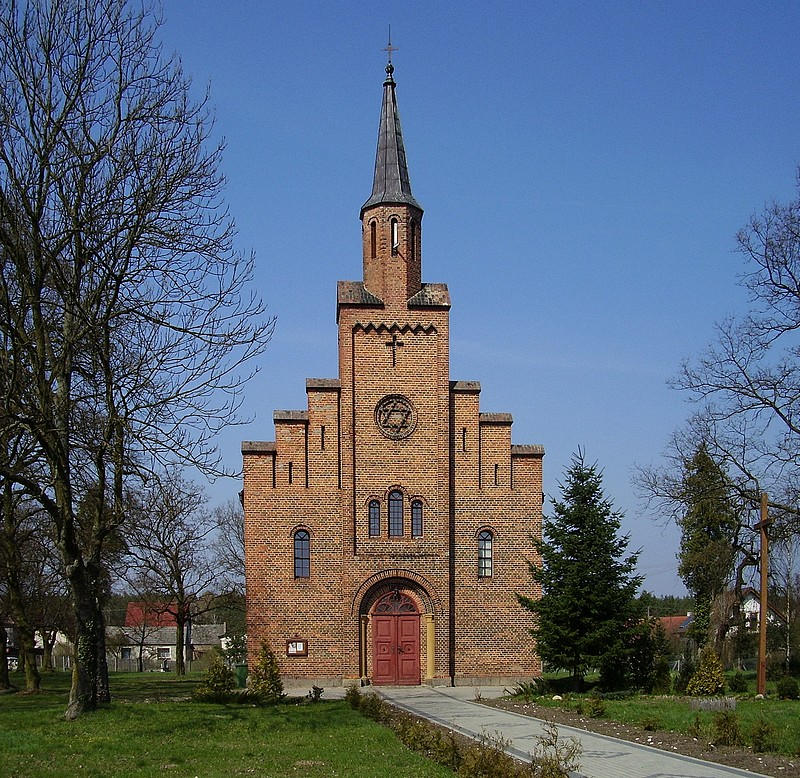
- Our Lady of the Rosary church in Ługi Ujskie

- Location within Poland
- Coordinates: 53°6′N 16°43′E
- Country: Poland
- Voivodeship: Greater Poland
- County: Piła
- Gmina: Ujście
- Time zone: UTC+1 (CET)
  - Summer (DST): UTC+2 (CEST)
- Vehicle registration: PP

Ługi Ujskie [ˈwuɡi ˈui̯skʲɛ] (German: Usch Hauland) is a village in the administrative district of Gmina Ujście, within Piła County, Greater Poland Voivodeship, in west-central Poland.

During World War II, the German administration operated a forced labour subcamp of the Stalag II-B prisoner-of-war camp for Allied POWs in the village.
