= Zabrodzie, Greater Poland Voivodeship =

Zabrodzie
- Village
- Location within Poland
- Coordinates: 53°16′N 16°42′E
- Country: Poland
- Voivodeship: Greater Poland
- County: Piła
- Gmina: Szydłowo
- Population: 30

Zabrodzie [zaˈbrɔd͡ʑɛ] (German: Gramattenbrück) is a village in the administrative district of Gmina Szydłowo, within Piła County, Greater Poland Voivodeship, in west-central Poland.
