= Zawada, Gmina Szydłowo =

Zawada
- Village
- Location within Poland
- Coordinates: 53°11′32″N 16°38′42″E
- Country: Poland
- Voivodeship: Greater Poland
- County: Piła
- Gmina: Szydłowo
- Population: 284

Zawada [zaˈvada] (German: Springberg) is a village in the administrative district of Gmina Szydłowo, within Piła County, Greater Poland Voivodeship, in west-central Poland.
