= Wiernowo =

- Village
- Location within Poland
- Coordinates: 53°8′21″N 17°15′34″E
- Country: Poland
- Voivodeship: Greater Poland
- County: Piła
- Gmina: Wyrzysk

Wiernowo [vjɛrˈnɔvɔ] is a village in the administrative district of Gmina Wyrzysk, within Piła County, Greater Poland Voivodeship, in west-central Poland.
