= Bagdad, Poland =

Bagdad
- Village
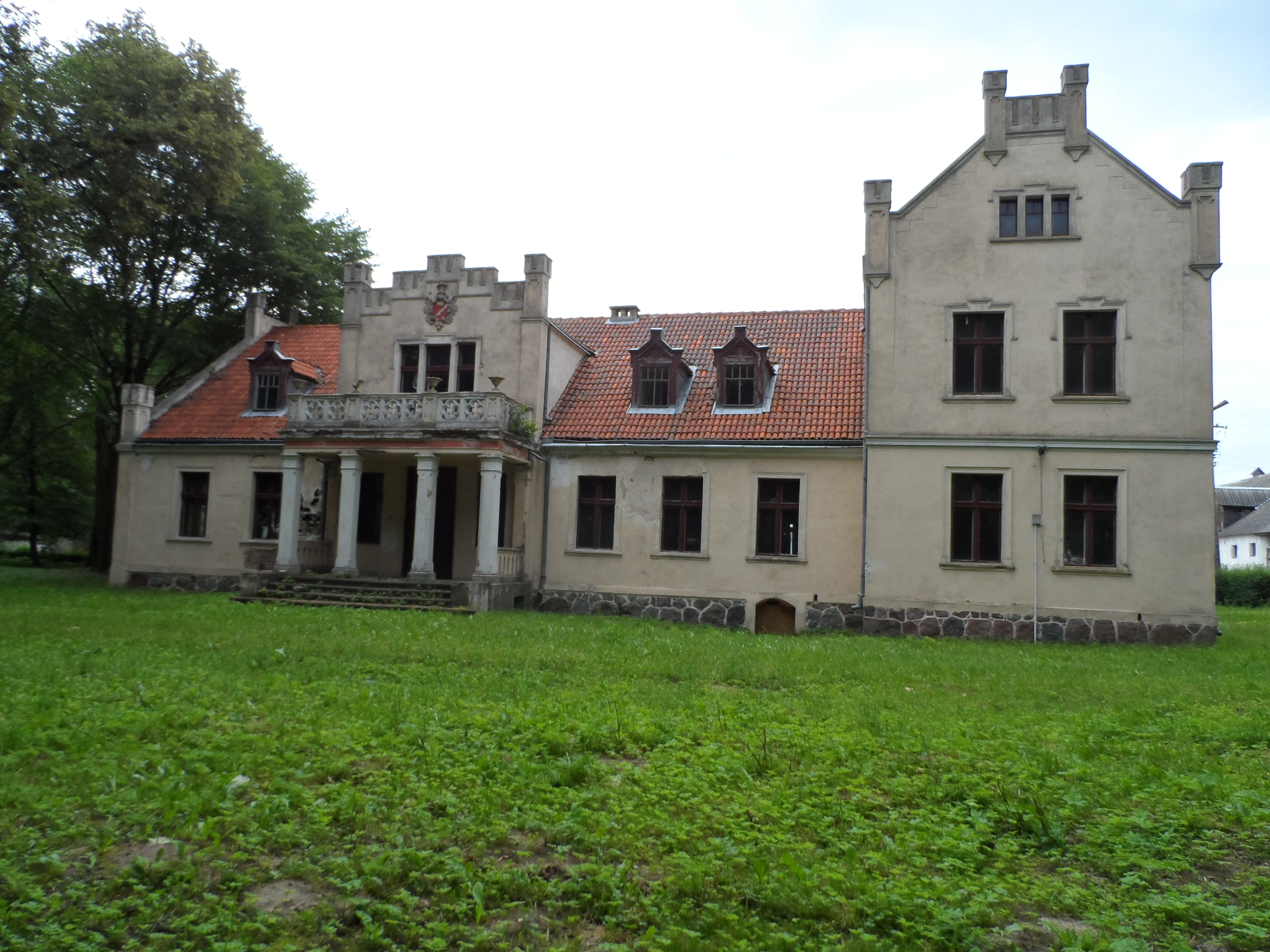
- Manor house in Bagdad

- Location within Poland
- Coordinates: 53°9′56″N 17°18′59″E
- Country: Poland
- Voivodeship: Greater Poland
- County: Piła
- Gmina: Wyrzysk
- Population: 120

Bagdad [ˈbaɡdat] is a village in the administrative district of Gmina Wyrzysk, within Piła County, Greater Poland Voivodeship, in west-central Poland. In 2006 the village had a population of 120.

Formerly, before World War II, Bagdad was a farm and belonged to Mieczysław Chłapowski, a Polish landlord and politician. The village currently has a manor house (Gothic Revival architecture style), and a stud farm.
