= Nowa Łubianka =

- Village
- Location within Poland
- Coordinates: 53°14′22″N 16°38′26″E
- Country: Poland
- Voivodeship: Greater Poland
- County: Piła
- Gmina: Szydłowo
- Population: 121

Nowa Łubianka [ˈnɔva wuˈbjanka] (German: Neu Lebehnke) is a village in the administrative district of Gmina Szydłowo, within Piła County, Greater Poland Voivodeship, in west-central Poland.
