= Solnówek =

- Settlement
- Location within Poland
- Coordinates: 53°8′32″N 16°58′48″E
- Country: Poland
- Voivodeship: Greater Poland
- County: Piła
- Gmina: Miasteczko Krajeńskie
- Population: 41

Solnówek [sɔlˈnuvɛk] is a settlement in the administrative district of Gmina Miasteczko Krajeńskie, within Piła County, Greater Poland Voivodeship, in west-central Poland.
