= Kotuń, Greater Poland Voivodeship =

Kotuń
- Village
- Location within Poland
- Coordinates: 53°7′43″N 16°39′0″E
- Country: Poland
- Voivodeship: Greater Poland
- County: Piła
- Gmina: Szydłowo
- Population: 690

Kotuń [ˈkɔtuɲ] (German: Kattun) is a village in the administrative district of Gmina Szydłowo, within Piła County, Greater Poland Voivodeship, in west-central Poland.
