= Śluza Nowe =

- Settlement
- Location within Poland
- Coordinates: 53°3′28″N 16°38′48″E
- Country: Poland
- Voivodeship: Greater Poland
- County: Piła
- Gmina: Ujście

Śluza Nowe [ˈɕluza ˈnɔvɛ] is a settlement in the administrative district of Gmina Ujście, within Piła County, Greater Poland Voivodeship, in west-central Poland.
