= Ostrówek, Piła County =

Ostrówek
- Village
- Location within Poland
- Coordinates: 53°7′27″N 17°20′35″E
- Country: Poland
- Voivodeship: Greater Poland
- County: Piła
- Gmina: Wyrzysk
- Population: 80

Ostrówek [ɔsˈtruvɛk] is a village in the administrative district of Gmina Wyrzysk, within Piła County, Greater Poland Voivodeship, in west-central Poland.
