= Arentowo =

- Village
- Location within Poland
- Coordinates: 53°7′N 17°2′E
- Country: Poland
- Voivodeship: Greater Poland
- County: Piła
- Gmina: Miasteczko Krajeńskie
- Population: 100

Arentowo [arɛnˈtɔvɔ] is a village in the administrative district of Gmina Miasteczko Krajeńskie, within Piła County, Greater Poland Voivodeship, in west-central Poland.
