= Bronisławki, Piła County =

Bronisławki
- Village
- Location within Poland
- Coordinates: 52°58′8″N 16°41′44″E
- Country: Poland
- Voivodeship: Greater Poland
- County: Piła
- Gmina: Ujście
- Population: 200

Bronisławki [brɔniˈswafki] is a village in the administrative district of Gmina Ujście, within Piła County, Greater Poland Voivodeship, in west-central Poland.
