= Leżenica-Kolonia =

- Village
- Location within Poland
- Coordinates: 53°09′55″N 16°33′42″E
- Country: Poland
- Voivodeship: Greater Poland
- County: Piła
- Gmina: Szydłowo
- Population: 50

Leżenica-Kolonia [lɛʐɛˈnit͡sa kɔˈlɔɲa] is a village in the administrative district of Gmina Szydłowo, within Piła County, Greater Poland Voivodeship, in west-central Poland.
