= Mirosław, Greater Poland Voivodeship =

Mirosław
- Village
- Location within Poland
- Coordinates: 53°3′N 16°42′E
- Country: Poland
- Voivodeship: Greater Poland
- County: Piła
- Gmina: Ujście

Mirosław [miˈrɔswaf] is a village in the administrative district of Gmina Ujście, within Piła County, Greater Poland Voivodeship, in west-central Poland.
