= Tarnowo, Piła County =

Tarnowo
- Village
- Location within Poland
- Coordinates: 53°16′N 16°41′E
- Country: Poland
- Voivodeship: Greater Poland
- County: Piła
- Gmina: Szydłowo
- Population: 170

Tarnowo [tarˈnɔvɔ] (German: Seegenfelde) is a village in the administrative district of Gmina Szydłowo, within Piła County, Greater Poland Voivodeship, in west-central Poland.
