= Chrustowo, Piła County =

Chrustowo
- Village
- Location within Poland
- Coordinates: 53°3′N 16°47′E
- Country: Poland
- Voivodeship: Greater Poland
- County: Piła
- Gmina: Ujście

Chrustowo [xrusˈtɔvɔ] is a village in the administrative district of Gmina Ujście, within Piła County, Greater Poland Voivodeship, in west-central Poland.
