= Krzewina =

Krzewina may refer to the following places in Poland:

- Krzewina, Lower Silesian Voivodeship (south-west Poland)
- Krzewina, Masovian Voivodeship (east-central Poland)
- Krzewina, Greater Poland Voivodeship (west-central Poland)
- Krzewina, Warmian-Masurian Voivodeship (north Poland)
