= Byszewice, Greater Poland Voivodeship =

Byszewice
- Village
- Location within Poland
- Coordinates: 53°5′4″N 16°58′3″E
- Country: Poland
- Voivodeship: Greater Poland
- County: Piła
- Gmina: Kaczory
- Population: 70

Byszewice [bɨʂɛˈvit͡sɛ] is a village in the administrative district of Gmina Kaczory, within Piła County, Greater Poland Voivodeship, in west-central Poland.
