= Różanka, Greater Poland Voivodeship =

Różanka
- Settlement
- Location within Poland
- Coordinates: 53°8′30″N 16°30′0″E
- Country: Poland
- Voivodeship: Greater Poland
- County: Piła
- Gmina: Szydłowo

Różanka (Polish pronunciation: [ruˈʐaŋka]) is a settlement in the administrative district of Gmina Szydłowo, within Piła County, Greater Poland Voivodeship, in west-central Poland.
