= Węglewo =

Węglewo may refer to the following places in Poland:

- Węglewo, Trzebnica County in Lower Silesian Voivodeship (south-west Poland)
- Węglewo, Wołów County in Lower Silesian Voivodeship (south-west Poland)
- Węglewo, Piła County in Greater Poland Voivodeship (west-central Poland)
- Węglewo, Poznań County in Greater Poland Voivodeship (west-central Poland)
- Węglewo, Pomeranian Voivodeship (north Poland)
- Węglewo, West Pomeranian Voivodeship (north-west Poland)
