= Komorowo, Piła County =

Komorowo
- Village
- Location within Poland
- Coordinates: 53°6′43″N 17°14′7″E
- Country: Poland
- Voivodeship: Greater Poland
- County: Piła
- Gmina: Wyrzysk
- Population: 140

Komorowo [kɔmɔˈrɔvɔ] is a village in the administrative district of Gmina Wyrzysk, within Piła County, Greater Poland Voivodeship, in west-central Poland.
