= Morzewo, Greater Poland Voivodeship =

Morzewo
- Village
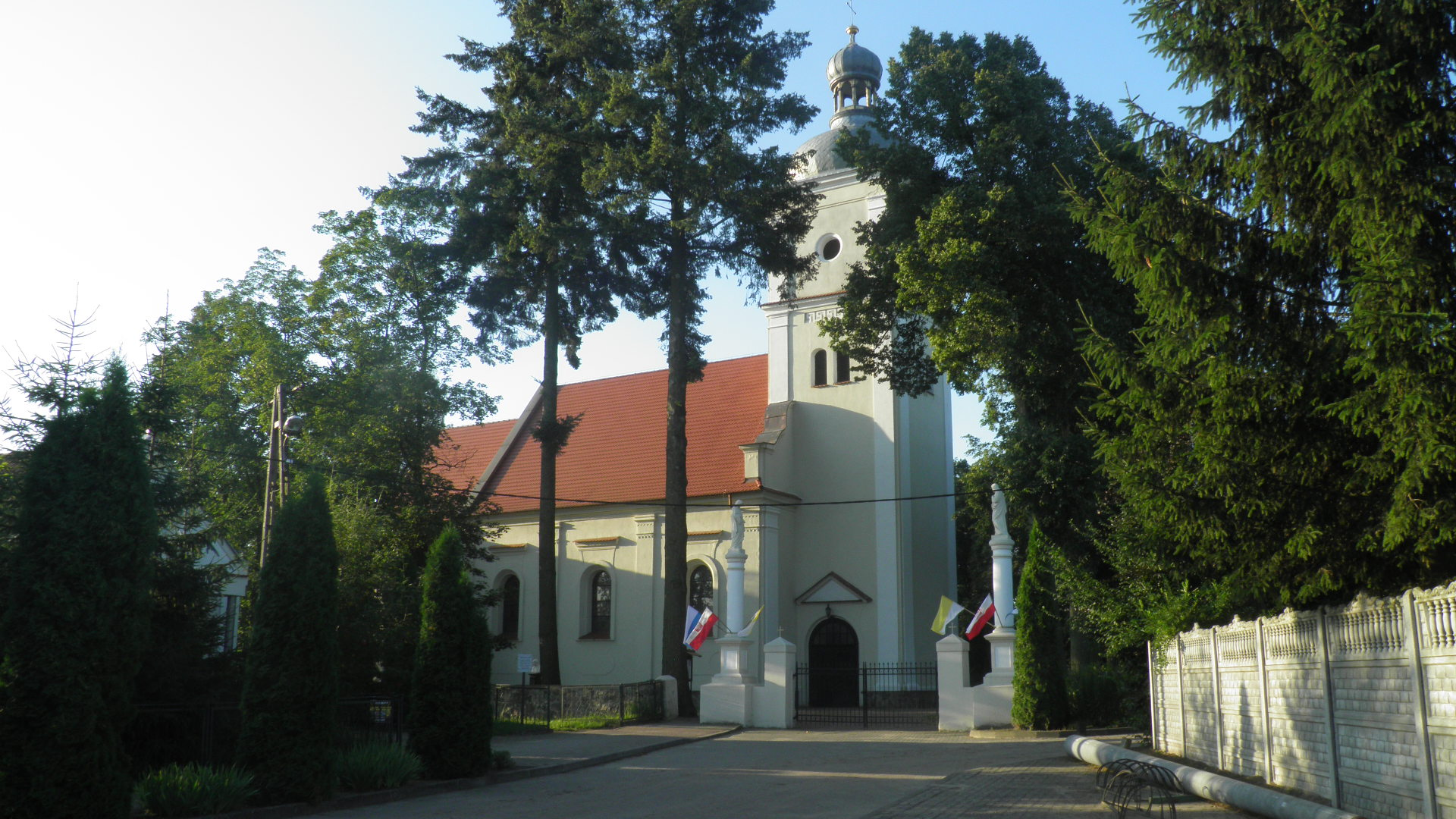
- Church of the Transfiguration in Morzewo

- Location within Poland
- Coordinates: 53°5′0″N 16°53′34″E
- Country: Poland
- Voivodeship: Greater Poland
- County: Piła
- Gmina: Kaczory

Population
  - Total: 620
- Time zone: UTC+01:00 (CET)
  - Summer (DST): UTC+02:00 (CEST)
- Vehicle registration: PP

Morzewo [mɔˈʐɛvɔ] is a village in the administrative district of Gmina Kaczory, within Piła County, Greater Poland Voivodeship, in west-central Poland.

== History ==
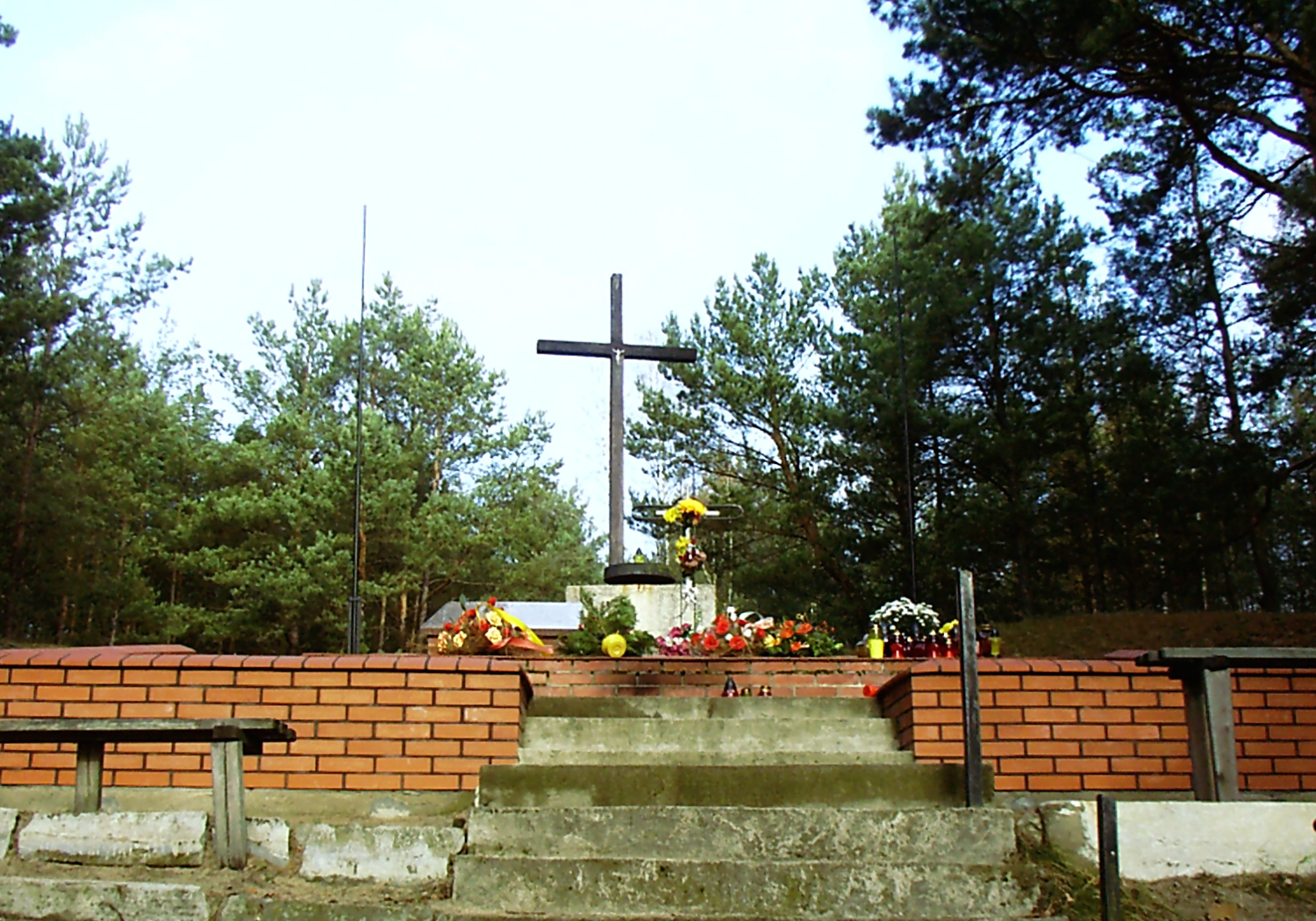
Memorial at the site of the German massacre of 41 Poles carried out in 1939

Morzewo was a private village of Polish nobility, administratively located in the Nakło County in the Kalisz Voivodeship in the Greater Poland Province of the Kingdom of Poland.

According to the 1921 census, the village had a population of 962, 99.2% Polish.

During the German occupation of Poland (World War II), on November 7, 1939, the German police carried out a massacre of 41 Poles in the village as part of the Intelligenzaktion. Among the victims were teachers, school principals, priests, policemen, local officials including mayor of the nearby town of Chodzież, merchants, craftsmen, farmers and former insurgents of the Greater Poland uprising from various nearby towns and villages. In 1943, the Germans burned the bodies of the victims in attempt to cover up the crime. In November 1940, several Polish families were expelled from Morzewo to the General Government, and some were deported to forced labour to Germany, while their farms were handed over to German colonists in accordance to the Lebensraum policy.

The main sights of Morzewo are the historic church of the Transfiguration and the memorial at the site of the 1939 massacre.
