= Krępsko, Greater Poland Voivodeship =

Krępsko
- Village
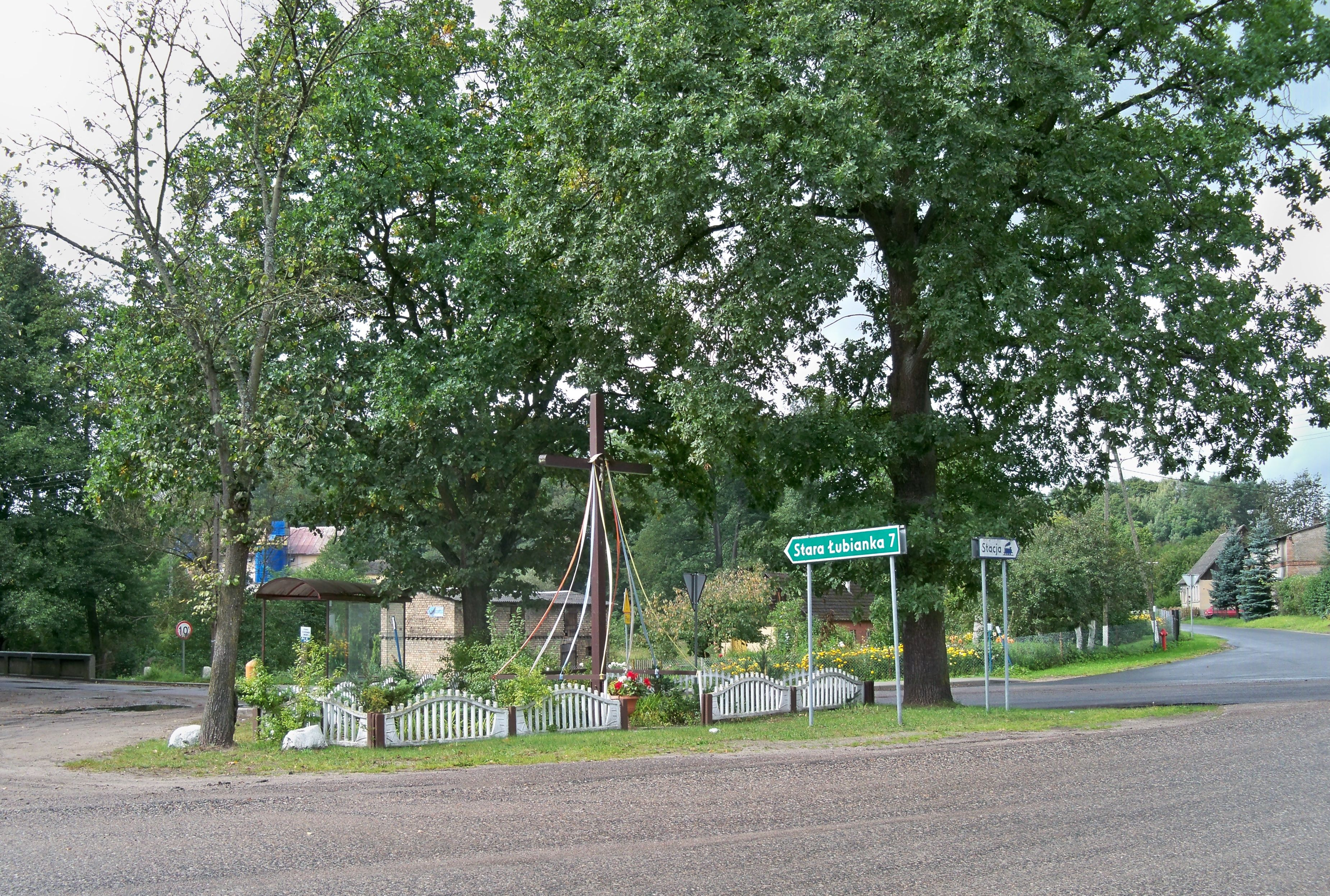
- Wayside crosses in Krępsko

- Location within Poland
- Coordinates: 53°15′50″N 16°46′40″E
- Country: Poland
- Voivodeship: Greater Poland
- County: Piła
- Gmina: Szydłowo
- Population: 292

Krępsko [ˈkrɛmpskɔ] (German: Kramske) is a village in the administrative district of Gmina Szydłowo, within Piła County, Greater Poland Voivodeship, in west-central Poland.
