= Gądek =

- Village
- Location within Poland
- Coordinates: 53°8′36″N 16°32′58″E
- Country: Poland
- Voivodeship: Greater Poland
- County: Piła
- Gmina: Szydłowo
- Population: 150

Gądek [ˈɡɔndɛk] is a village in the administrative district of Gmina Szydłowo, within Piła County, Greater Poland Voivodeship, in west-central Poland.
