= Dobrzyca (disambiguation) =

Dobrzyca is a town in Pleszew County, Greater Poland Voivodeship in west-central Poland.

Dobrzyca may also refer to:

- Dobrzyca, Piła County in Greater Poland Voivodeship (west-central Poland)
- Dobrzyca, Wałcz County in West Pomeranian Voivodeship (north-west Poland)
- Dobrzyca, Koszalin County in West Pomeranian Voivodeship (north-west Poland)
