= Wyciąg, Greater Poland Voivodeship =

Wyciąg
- Settlement
- Location within Poland
- Coordinates: 53°5′20″N 17°19′35″E
- Country: Poland
- Voivodeship: Greater Poland
- County: Piła
- Gmina: Wyrzysk

Wyciąg [ˈvɨt͡ɕɔnk] is a settlement in the administrative district of Gmina Wyrzysk, within Piła County, Greater Poland Voivodeship, in west-central Poland.
