= Prawomyśl =

- Village
- Location within Poland
- Coordinates: 53°04′56″N 16°56′27″E
- Country: Poland
- Voivodeship: Greater Poland
- County: Piła
- Gmina: Kaczory

Prawomyśl [praˈvɔmɨɕl] is a village in the administrative district of Gmina Kaczory, within Piła County, Greater Poland Voivodeship, in west-central Poland.
