= Żuławka =

Żuławka may refer to:

- Żuławka, Greater Poland Voivodeship
- Żuławka, Pomeranian Voivodeship

== See also ==
- Żuławka Sztumska, a village in Pomeranian Voivodeship
