= Nieżychówko =

- Village
- Location within Poland
- Coordinates: 53°8′37″N 17°8′38″E
- Country: Poland
- Voivodeship: Greater Poland
- County: Piła
- Gmina: Białośliwie

Nieżychówko [ɲɛʐɨˈxufkɔ] is a village in an administrative district of Gmina Białośliwie, within Piła County, Greater Poland Voivodeship, in west-central Poland.
