= Zielona Góra, Greater Poland Voivodeship =

Zielona Góra
- Village
- Location within Poland
- Coordinates: 53°8′8″N 17°16′14″E
- Country: Poland
- Voivodeship: Greater Poland
- County: Piła
- Gmina: Wyrzysk

Zielona Góra (Polish: [ʑɛˈlɔna ˈɡura]) is a village in the administrative district of Gmina Wyrzysk, within Piła County, Greater Poland Voivodeship, in west-central Poland.
