= Śmiłowo, Piła County =

Śmiłowo
- Village
- Location within Poland
- Coordinates: 53°8′N 16°56′E
- Country: Poland
- Voivodeship: Greater Poland
- County: Piła
- Gmina: Kaczory
- Population: 1,145

Śmiłowo [ɕmiˈwɔvɔ] is a village in the administrative district of Gmina Kaczory, within Piła County, Greater Poland Voivodeship, in west-central Poland.
