= Grabówno =

- Village
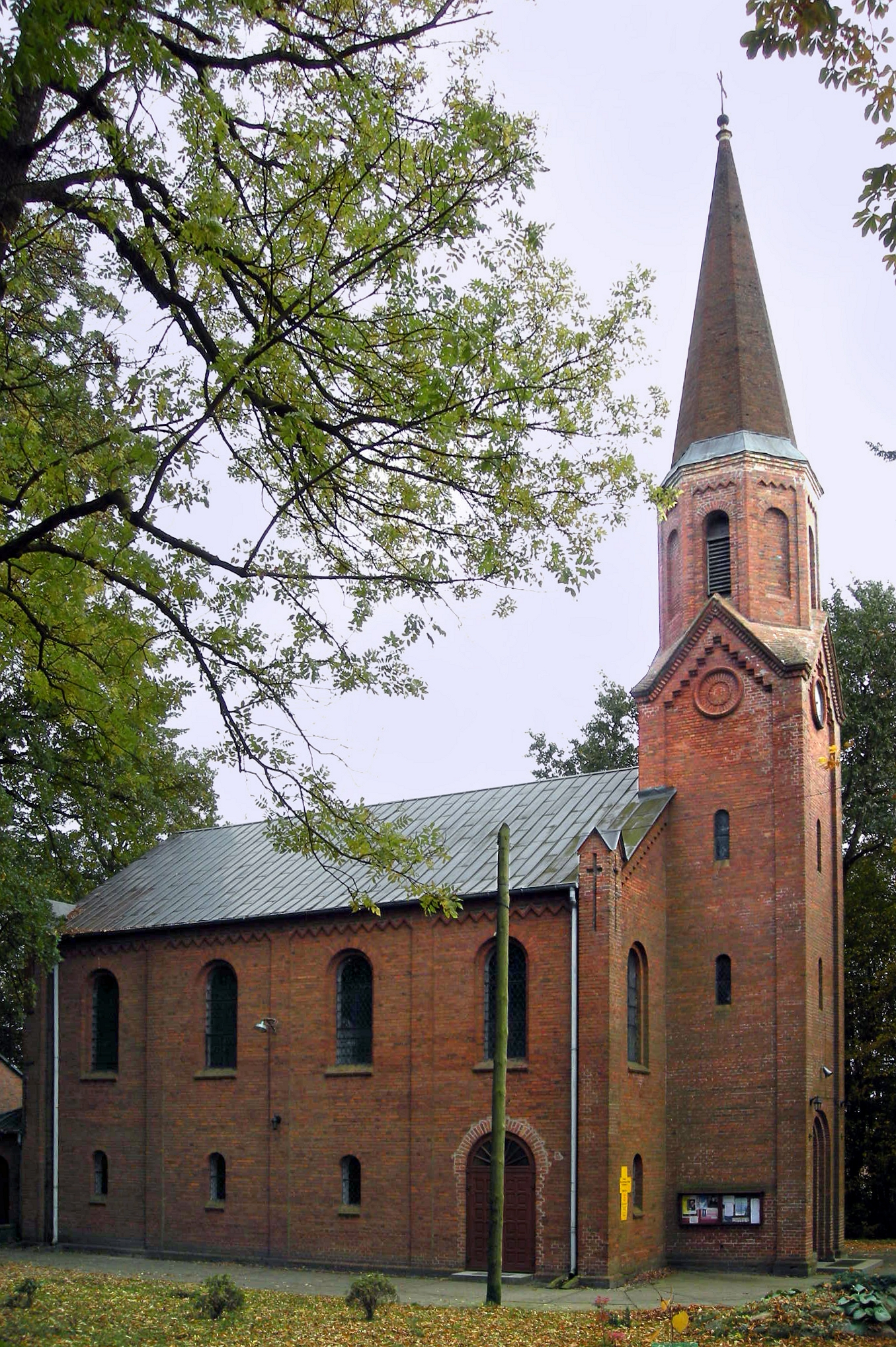
- Church of St. Anthony of Padua

- Location within Poland
- Coordinates: 53°07′55″N 17°00′34″E
- Country: Poland
- Voivodeship: Greater Poland
- County: Piła
- Gmina: Miasteczko Krajeńskie

Grabówno [ɡraˈbuvnɔ] is a village in the administrative district of Gmina Miasteczko Krajeńskie, within Piła County, Greater Poland Voivodeship, in west-central Poland.
