= Grabionna =

- Village
- Location within Poland
- Coordinates: 53°7′N 17°4′E
- Country: Poland
- Voivodeship: Greater Poland
- County: Piła
- Gmina: Miasteczko Krajeńskie

Grabionna [ɡraˈbjɔnna] is a village in the administrative district of Gmina Miasteczko Krajeńskie, within Piła County, Greater Poland Voivodeship, in west-central Poland.

== Notable residents ==
- Gerhard Stöck (1911–1985), German athlete
