= Osiek nad Notecią =

- Village
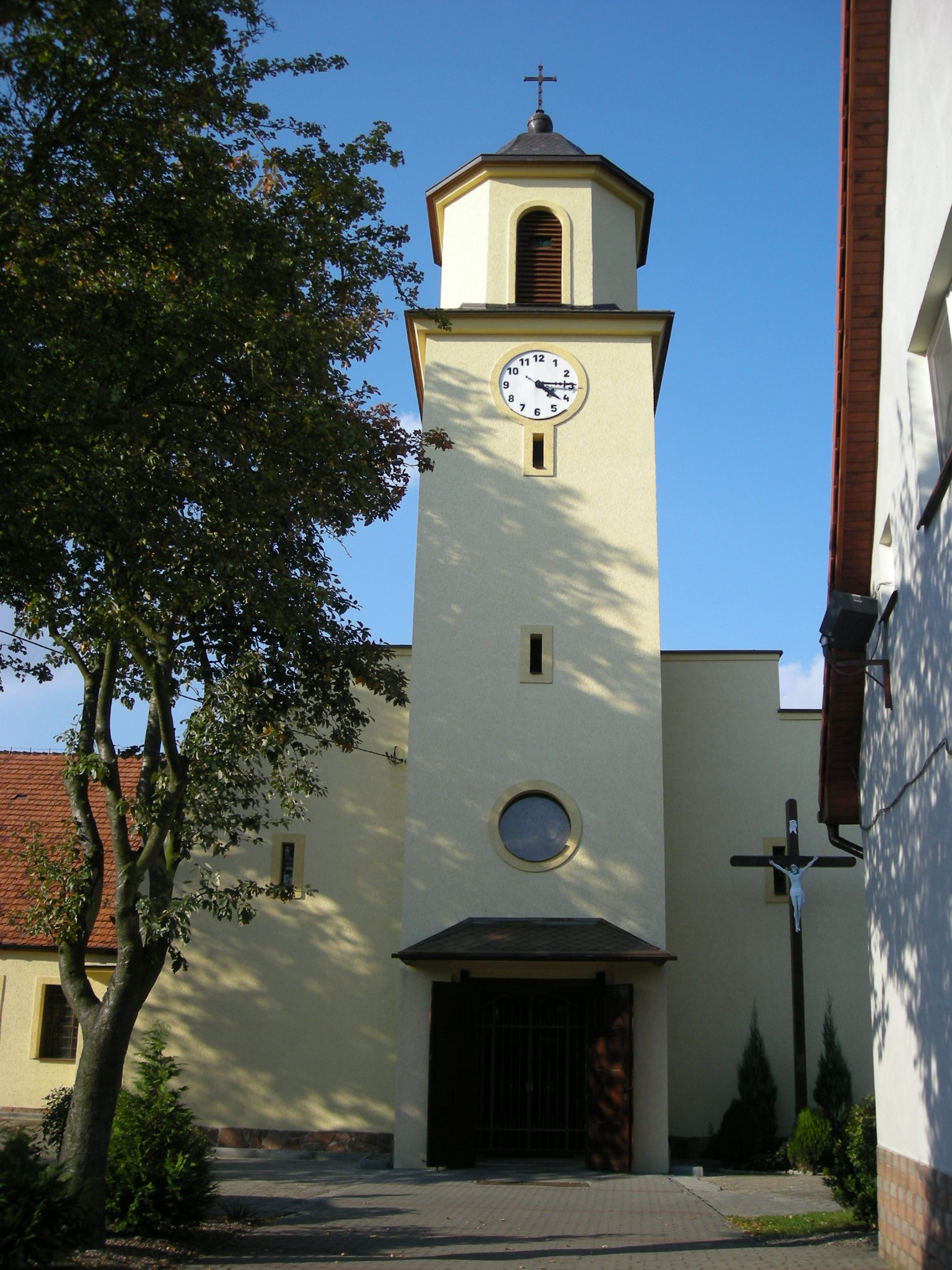
- Church of Saint Joseph

- Location within Poland
- Coordinates: 53°7′N 17°18′E
- Country: Poland
- Voivodeship: Greater Poland
- County: Piła
- Gmina: Wyrzysk

Population
  - Total: 4,000

Osiek nad Notecią [ˈɔɕɛk ˌnad nɔˈtɛt͡ɕɔ̃] is a village in the administrative district of Gmina Wyrzysk, within Piła County, Greater Poland Voivodeship, in west-central Poland.

The village is known for the second largest open-air museum in Poland with a number of farm houses and windmills dated from the 18th and 19th centuries from the North Wielkopolska and Krajna region as well as for an archaeology museum on the site of the ancient burial site dated at around 500 b.c.

General Władysław Anders was associated with that area (his father managed a horse stable in the village of Pracz which is now a part of Osiek).
