= Pokrzywnica, Piła County =

Pokrzywnica
- Village
- Location within Poland
- Coordinates: 53°9′N 16°34′E
- Country: Poland
- Voivodeship: Greater Poland
- County: Piła
- Gmina: Szydłowo
- Population: 262

Pokrzywnica [pɔkʂɨvˈnit͡sa] (German: Krummfließ) is a village in the administrative district of Gmina Szydłowo, within Piła County, Greater Poland Voivodeship, in west-central Poland.
