= Zelgniewo =

- Village
- Location within Poland
- Coordinates: 53°11′N 16°57′E
- Country: Poland
- Voivodeship: Greater Poland
- County: Piła
- Gmina: Kaczory

Zelgniewo [zɛlɡˈɲɛvɔ] is a village in the administrative district of Gmina Kaczory, within Piła County, Greater Poland Voivodeship, in west-central Poland. The population was 469 at the 2011 census.
