= Pluty, Greater Poland Voivodeship =

Pluty
- Village
- Location within Poland
- Coordinates: 53°12′44″N 16°33′42″E
- Country: Poland
- Voivodeship: Greater Poland
- County: Piła
- Gmina: Szydłowo
- Population: 130

Pluty [ˈplutɨ] is a village in the administrative district of Gmina Szydłowo, within Piła County, Greater Poland Voivodeship, in west-central Poland.
