= Jaraczewo, Piła County =

Jaraczewo
- Village
- Location within Poland
- Coordinates: 53°10′6″N 16°35′36″E
- Country: Poland
- Voivodeship: Greater Poland
- County: Piła
- Gmina: Szydłowo
- Population: 396

Jaraczewo [jaraˈt͡ʂɛvɔ] (German: Klein Wittenberg) is a village in the administrative district of Gmina Szydłowo, within Piła County, Greater Poland Voivodeship, in west-central Poland.
