= Gleszczonek =

- Settlement
- Location within Poland
- Coordinates: 53°10′28″N 17°17′0″E
- Country: Poland
- Voivodeship: Greater Poland
- County: Piła
- Gmina: Wyrzysk

Gleszczonek [ɡlɛʂˈt͡ʂɔnɛk] is a settlement in the administrative district of Gmina Wyrzysk, within Piła County, Greater Poland Voivodeship, in west-central Poland.
