= Rzęszkowo =

- Village
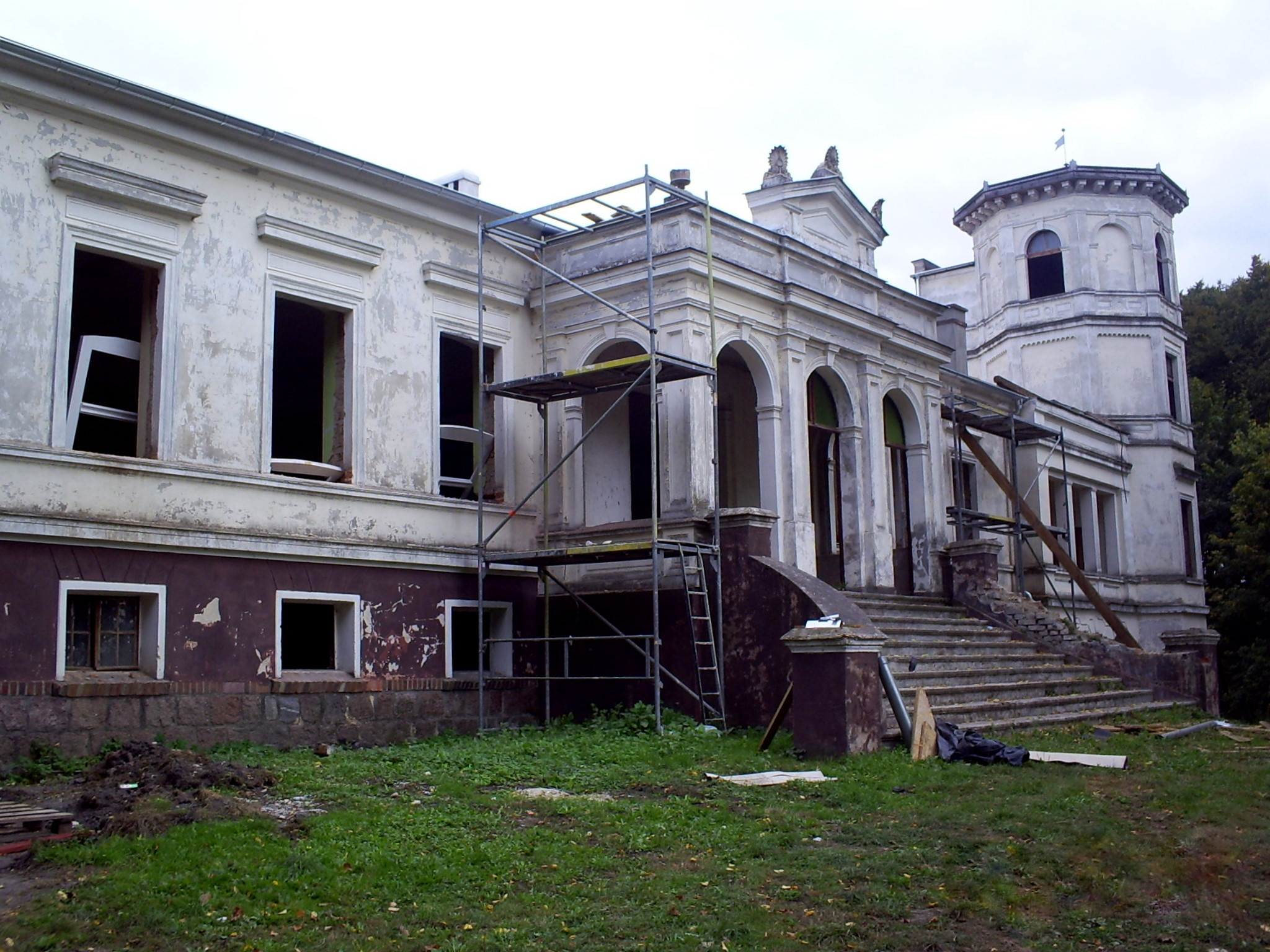

- Location within Poland
- Coordinates: 53°08′35″N 17°12′20″E
- Country: Poland
- Voivodeship: Greater Poland
- County: Piła
- Gmina: Wyrzysk

Rzęszkowo [ʐɛ̃ʂˈkɔvɔ] is a village in the administrative district of Gmina Wyrzysk, within Piła County, Greater Poland Voivodeship, in west-central Poland.
