= Dąbki, Greater Poland Voivodeship =

Dąbki
- Village
- Location within Poland
- Coordinates: 53°08′20″N 17°19′54″E
- Country: Poland
- Voivodeship: Greater Poland
- County: Piła
- Gmina: Wyrzysk

Dąbki ([ˈdɔmpki]; German: Dombke) is a village in the administrative district of Gmina Wyrzysk, within Piła County, Greater Poland Voivodeship, in west-central Poland.
