= Róża Wielka-Kolonia =

- Settlement
- Location within Poland
- Coordinates: 53°8′56″N 16°26′9″E
- Country: Poland
- Voivodeship: Greater Poland
- County: Piła
- Gmina: Szydłowo

Róża Wielka-Kolonia [ˈruʐa ˈvjɛlka kɔˈlɔɲa] is a settlement in the administrative district of Gmina Szydłowo, within Piła County, Greater Poland Voivodeship, in west-central Poland.
