= Miasteczko-Huby =

- Village
- Location within Poland
- Coordinates: 53°05′08″N 16°58′43″E
- Country: Poland
- Voivodeship: Greater Poland
- County: Piła
- Gmina: Miasteczko Krajeńskie

Miasteczko-Huby [mjasˈtɛt͡ʂkɔ ˈxubɨ] is a village in the administrative district of Gmina Miasteczko Krajeńskie, within Piła County, Greater Poland Voivodeship, in west-central Poland.
