= Nowa Wieś Ujska =

- Village
- Location within Poland
- Coordinates: 53°01′59″N 16°44′56″E
- Country: Poland
- Voivodeship: Greater Poland
- County: Piła
- Gmina: Ujście
- Population: 830

Nowa Wieś Ujska [ˈnɔva ˈvjɛɕ ˈui̯ska] is a village in the administrative district of Gmina Ujście, within Piła County, Greater Poland Voivodeship, in west-central Poland.
