= Czarże =

- Village
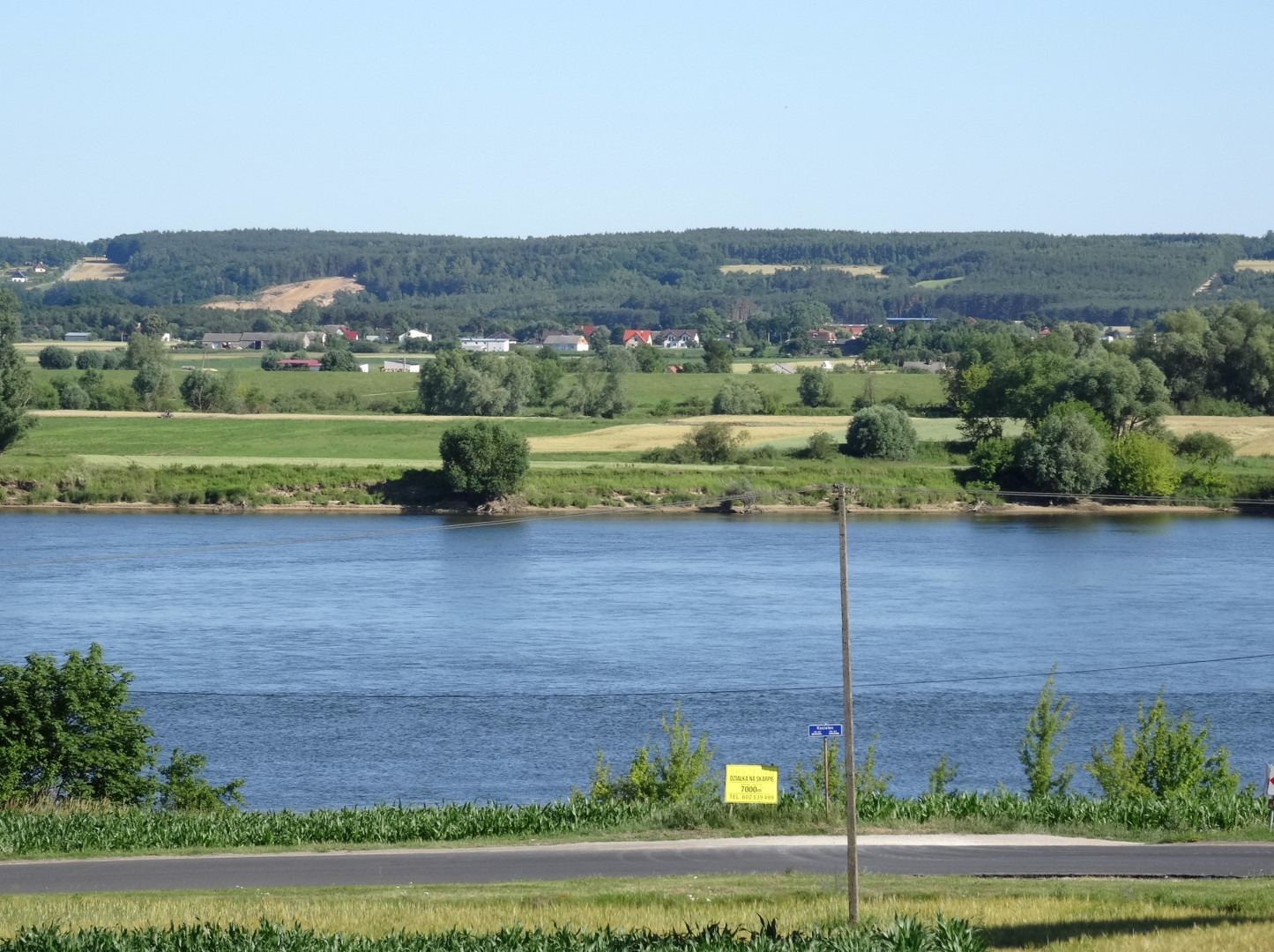
- View of Czarże from Kozielec on the other side of the Vistula river

- Location within Poland
- Coordinates: 53°13′N 18°18′E
- Country: Poland
- Voivodeship: Kuyavian-Pomeranian
- County: Bydgoszcz
- Gmina: Dąbrowa Chełmińska
- First mentioned: 1222
- Population (approx.): 1,800
- Time zone: UTC+1 (CET)
  - Summer (DST): UTC+2 (CEST)
- Vehicle registration: CCH

Czarże [ˈt͡ʂarʐɛ] is a village in the administrative district of Gmina Dąbrowa Chełmińska, within Bydgoszcz County, Kuyavian-Pomeranian Voivodeship, in north-central Poland. It is located in the Chełmno Land in the historic region of Pomerania.

== History ==
The oldest known mention of the village comes from a document of Duke Konrad I of Masovia from 1222.

During the German occupation (World War II), in 1939, local Polish teachers were murdered by the Germans in a massacre of Poles committed in nearby Klamry as part of the Intelligenzaktion. In October 1940, the occupiers also carried out expulsions of Poles, whose farms were then handed over to German colonists as part of the Lebensraum policy.

== Notable people ==
- Piotr Konieczka (1901–1939), corporal of the Polish Army, considered the first victim of World War II; born in Czarże
