= Piotr Konieczka =

Polish Army soldier (1901–1939)

- Born: 29 April 1901; Czarże, German Empire
- Died: 1 September 1939 (aged 38); Jeziorki, Poland
- Military career
- Service years: 1939
- Rank: Corporal
- Conflicts: German invasion of Poland †
- Awards: Order of Polonia Restituta

Piotr Konieczka (29 April 1901 – 1 September 1939) was a Polish Army soldier. He is considered by some historians to have been the first Polish soldier to die in World War II.

== Biography ==
Piotr Konieczka was born in the village of Czarże near Chełmno. He moved with his family to Brodna in Greater Poland where he bought a three-hectare farm. He was mobilized in the spring of 1939. On the night of 31 August to 1 September, he served in a platoon sent to strengthen the Jeziorki border checkpoint. After 1:00 am the checkpoint was attacked by the German diversion squad. Around 1:40 am Konieczka, left alone operating a machine gun, was bashed to death with rifle butts.

According to Polish historians, Konieczka may have been the first Polish soldier killed during the invasion. A historian confirmed from records that Konieczka was the first war victim in the Greater Poland region. While the attack was not by regular Wehrmacht soldiers, it was considered to be part of the war, because the attackers did not retreat back to German territory, as was happening with earlier acts of German sabotage against Poland.

In 2009, a monument was erected to him in Jeziorki.

On 14 September 2010, he was posthumously awarded the Knight's Cross of the Order of Polonia Restituta.
