= Brzostowo, Greater Poland Voivodeship =

Brzostowo
- Village
- Location within Poland
- Coordinates: 53°6′7″N 17°1′29″E
- Country: Poland
- Voivodeship: Greater Poland
- County: Piła
- Gmina: Miasteczko Krajeńskie

Brzostowo [bʐɔsˈtɔvɔ] is a village in the administrative district of Gmina Miasteczko Krajeńskie, within Piła County, Greater Poland Voivodeship, in west-central Poland.
