= Krzewina, Greater Poland Voivodeship =

Krzewina
- Village
- Location within Poland
- Coordinates: 53°04′24″N 16°52′26″E
- Country: Poland
- Voivodeship: Greater Poland
- County: Piła
- Gmina: Kaczory

Krzewina [kʂɛˈvina] is a village in the administrative district of Gmina Kaczory, within Piła County, Greater Poland Voivodeship, in west-central Poland.
