= Gmina Ujście =

Gmina Ujście Ujście Commune
- Gmina
- Coat of arms
- Interactive map of Gmina Ujście
- Coordinates (Ujście): 53°4′N 16°44′E
- Country: Poland
- Voivodeship: Greater Poland
- County: Piła
- Seat: Ujście

Area
  - Total: 125.98 km^{2} (48.64 sq mi)

Population (2006)
  - Total: 8,009
  - Density: 63.57/km^{2} (164.7/sq mi)
  - Urban: 3,899
  - Rural: 4,110
- Website: http://www.ujscie.pl

Gmina Ujście is an urban-rural gmina (administrative district) in Piła County, Greater Poland Voivodeship, in west-central Poland. Its seat is the town of Ujście, which lies approximately 10 kilometres (6 mi) south of Piła and 75 km (47 mi) north of the regional capital Poznań.

The gmina covers an area of 125.98 square kilometres (48.6 sq mi), and as of 2006 its total population is 8,009 (out of which the population of Ujście amounts to 3,899, and the population of the rural part of the gmina is 4,110).

== Villages ==
Apart from the town of Ujście, Gmina Ujście contains the villages and settlements of Bronisławki, Byszki, Chrustowo, Jabłonowo, Kruszewo, Ługi Ujskie, Mirosław, Nowa Wieś Ujska, Nowie, Śluza Nowe, Ujście-Łęg, Węglewo and Wilanowiec.

== Neighbouring gminas ==
Gmina Ujście is bordered by the town of Piła and by the gminas of Chodzież, Czarnków, Kaczory and Trzcianka.
