= Węglewo, Piła County =

Węglewo
- Village
- Location within Poland
- Coordinates: 52°59′N 16°43′E
- Country: Poland
- Voivodeship: Greater Poland
- County: Piła
- Gmina: Ujście

Węglewo [vɛnˈɡlɛvɔ] is a village in the administrative district of Gmina Ujście, within Piła County, Greater Poland Voivodeship, in west-central Poland.
