= Gmina Białośliwie =

Gmina Białośliwie Białośliwie Commune
- Gmina
- Coat of arms
- Interactive map of Gmina Białośliwie
- Coordinates (Białośliwie): 53°6′N 17°8′E
- Country: Poland
- Voivodeship: Greater Poland
- County: Piła
- Seat: Białośliwie

Area
  - Total: 75.68 km^{2} (29.22 sq mi)

Population (2006)
  - Total: 4,847
  - Density: 64.05/km^{2} (165.9/sq mi)

Gmina Białośliwie is a rural gmina (administrative district) in Piła County, Greater Poland Voivodeship, in west-central Poland. Its seat is the village of Białośliwie, which lies approximately 28 kilometres (17 mi) east of Piła and 80 km (50 mi) north of the regional capital Poznań.

The gmina covers an area of 75.68 square kilometres (29.2 sq mi), and as of 2006 its total population is 4,847.

== Villages ==
Gmina Białośliwie contains the villages and settlements of Białośliwie, Dębówko Nowe, Dębówko Stare, Dworzakowo, Krostkowo, Nieżychówko, Nieżychowo, Pobórka Mała, Pobórka Wielka, and Tomaszewo.

== Neighbouring gminas ==
Gmina Białośliwie is bordered by the gminas of Miasteczko Krajeńskie, Szamocin, Wyrzysk, and Wysoka.
