= Gmina Szydłowo, Greater Poland Voivodeship =

Gmina Szydłowo Szydłowo Commune
- Gmina
- Coat of arms
- Interactive map of Gmina Szydłowo
- Coordinates (Szydłowo): 53°9′44″N 16°37′0″E
- Country: Poland
- Voivodeship: Greater Poland
- County: Piła
- Seat: Szydłowo

Area
  - Total: 267.53 km^{2} (103.29 sq mi)

Population (2006)
  - Total: 7,594
  - Density: 28.39/km^{2} (73.52/sq mi)
- Website: http://www.szydlowo.pl

Gmina Szydłowo is a rural gmina (administrative district) in Piła County, Greater Poland Voivodeship, in west-central Poland. Its seat is the village of Szydłowo, which lies approximately 8 kilometres (5 mi) west of Piła and 87 km (54 mi) north of the regional capital Poznań.

The gmina covers an area of 267.53 square kilometres (103.3 sq mi), and as of 2006 its total population is 7,594.

== Villages ==
Gmina Szydłowo contains the villages and settlements of Coch PGR, Cyk, Czaplino, Dąbrowa-Kolonia, Dobrzyca, Dolaszewo, Furman, Gądek, Jaraczewo, Klęśnik, Kłoda, Kolonia Busz, Kotuń, Krępsko, Leśny Dworek, Leżenica, Leżenica-Kolonia, Nowa Łubianka, Nowy Dwór, Pluty, Płytnica, Pokrzywnica, Róża Mała, Róża Wielka, Róża Wielka-Kolonia, Różanka, Skrzatusz, Stara Łubianka, Szydłowo, Tarnowo, Wildek, Zabrodzie and Zawada.

== Neighbouring gminas ==
Gmina Szydłowo is bordered by the town of Piła and by the gminas of Jastrowie, Krajenka, Tarnówka, Trzcianka and Wałcz.
