= Gmina Wyrzysk =

Gmina Wyrzysk Wyrzysk Commune
- Gmina
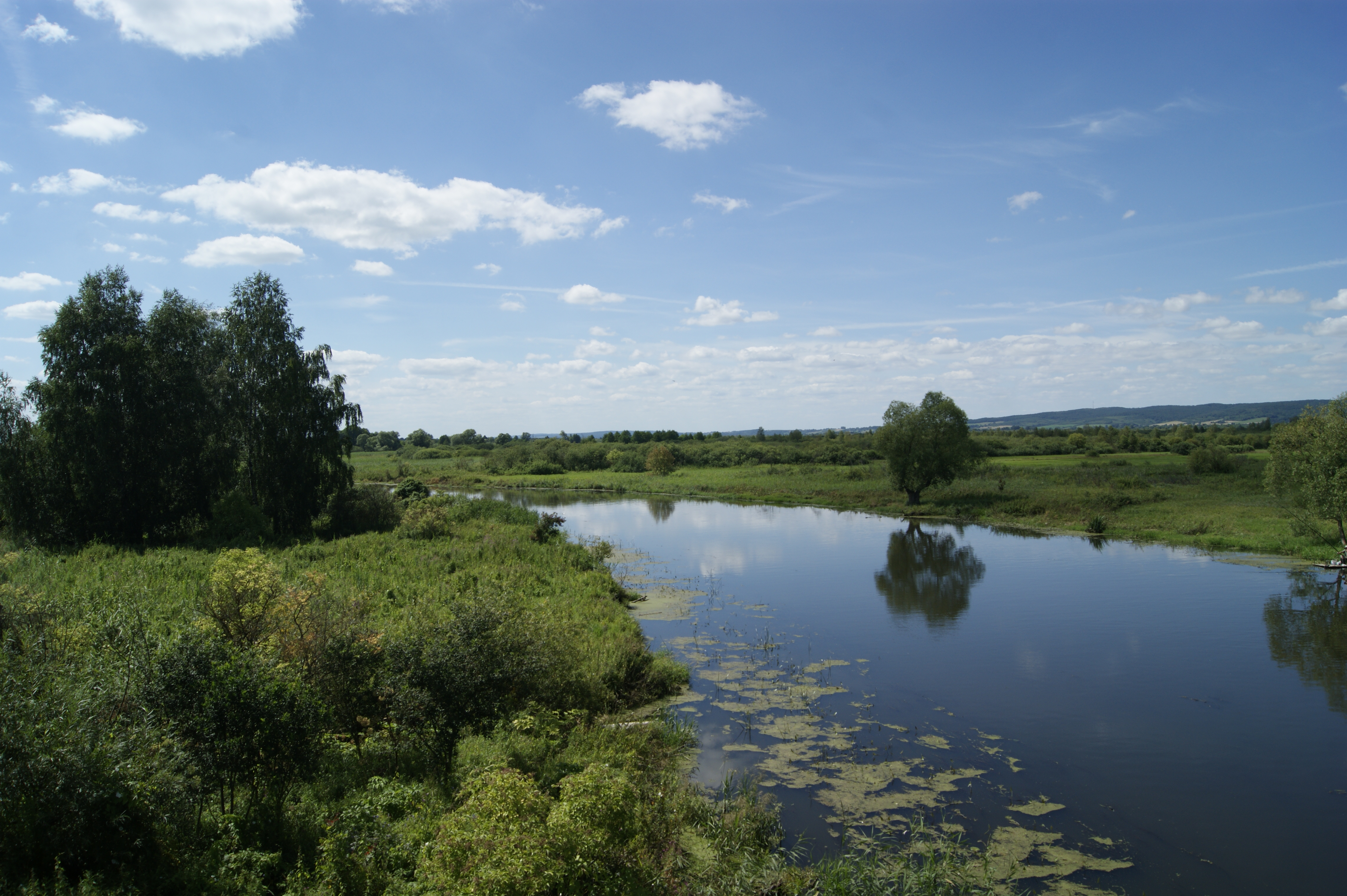
- Natural landscape of the commune

- Flag Coat of arms
- Interactive map of Gmina Wyrzysk
- Coordinates (Wyrzysk): 53°9′9″N 17°16′4″E
- Country: Poland
- Voivodeship: Greater Poland
- County: Piła
- Seat: Wyrzysk

Area
  - Total: 160.75 km^{2} (62.07 sq mi)

Population (2006)
  - Total: 14,132
  - Density: 87.913/km^{2} (227.69/sq mi)
  - Urban: 5,234
  - Rural: 8,898
- Vehicle registration: PP
- Website: https://www.wyrzysk.pl

Gmina Wyrzysk is an urban-rural gmina (administrative district) in Piła County, Greater Poland Voivodeship, in west-central Poland. Its seat is the town of Wyrzysk, which lies approximately 36 kilometres (22 mi) east of Piła and 87 km (54 mi) north of the regional capital Poznań.

The gmina covers an area of 160.75 square kilometres (62.1 sq mi), and as of 2006 its total population is 14,132 (out of which the population of Wyrzysk amounts to 5,234, and the population of the rural part of the gmina is 8,898, from which almost half lives in Osiek nad Notecią).

== Villages ==
Apart from the town of Wyrzysk, Gmina Wyrzysk contains the villages and settlements of Anusin, Auguścin, Bagdad, Bąkowo, Dąbki, Dobrzyniewo, Falmierowo, Glesno, Gleszczonek, Gromadno, Hercowo, Karolewo, Klawek, Komorowo, Konstantynowo, Kościerzyn Wielki, Kosztowo, Marynka, Masłowo, Młotkówko, Nowe Bielawy, Osiek nad Notecią, Ostrówek, Polanowo, Polinowo, Pracz, Ruda, Rzęszkowo, Wiernowo, Wyciąg, Wyrzysk Skarbowy, Żelazno, Zielona Góra and Żuławka.

== Neighbouring gminas ==
Gmina Wyrzysk is bordered by the gminas of Białośliwie, Gołańcz, Kcynia, Łobżenica, Sadki, Szamocin and Wysoka.

== Geographic location ==
Gmina (commune) Wyrzysk is located in the ethnocultural region of Krajna in northern Greater Poland. Administratively it lies on the northern edge of Greater Poland Voivodeship; in the east it borders gmina Sadki in the Kuyavian-Pomeranian Voivodeship. Of the district area, 117.11 km² are occupied by arable land and 19.65 km² by forests.

The commune lies in Krajna Plateau. Its southern border is formed by the River Noteć with its tributary, the Łobżonka, which cuts through the picturesque moraine hills rising over the wide valley of the Noteć. One of these hills, Dębowa Góra, reaches a height of 192 metres above sea level and is the highest elevation of the Krajna Region. Over 60 per cent of the commune is protected as an area of scenic beauty.

Conditions favourable for human settlement occurred in the present Wyrzysk Region in the postglacial period. Its relics are now left on the moraine hills along the Noteć River. Archaeological excavations in the village of Żuławka revealed that humans arrived here as early as nine thousand years ago. Soon they built a permanent crossing over the Noteć. Those wooden bridges in the vicinity of present Żuławka were maintained by people settling in this area for the following 3,500 years, which is a unique example of engineering skills in prehistoric Europe.
