= Cyk, Greater Poland Voivodeship =

Cyk
- Village
- Location within Poland
- Coordinates: 53°8′25″N 16°39′0″E
- Country: Poland
- Voivodeship: Greater Poland
- County: Piła
- Gmina: Szydłowo

Cyk [t͡sɨk] is a village in the administrative district of Gmina Szydłowo, within Piła County, Greater Poland Voivodeship, in west-central Poland.
