= Pracz =

- Settlement
- Location within Poland
- Coordinates: 53°8′N 17°19′E
- Country: Poland
- Voivodeship: Greater Poland
- County: Piła
- Gmina: Wyrzysk

Pracz [prat͡ʂ] is a settlement in the administrative district of Gmina Wyrzysk, within Piła County, Greater Poland Voivodeship, in west-central Poland.
