= Wyrzysk =

Town in Greater Poland Voivodeship, Poland

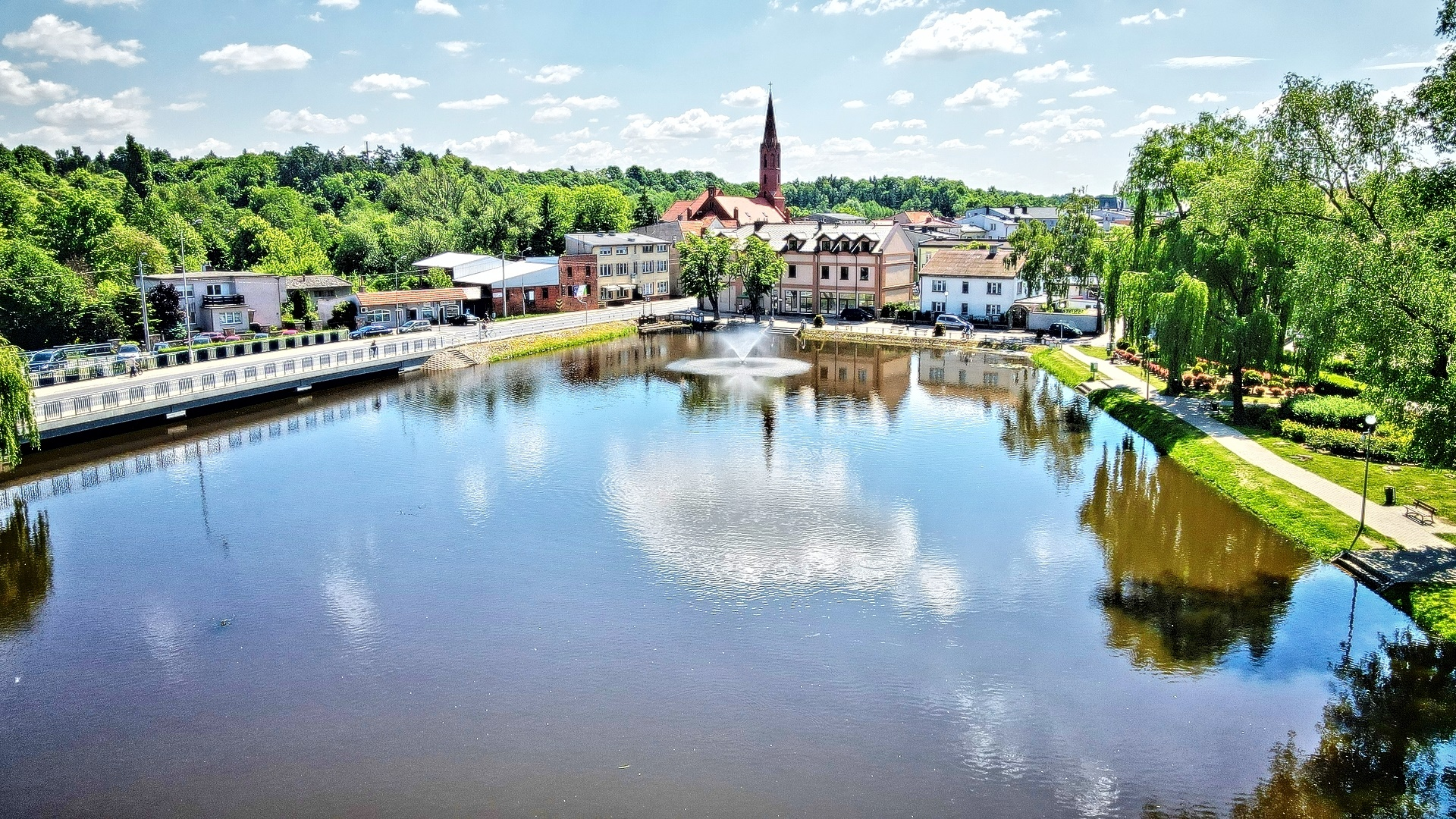
- Municipal pond in Wyrzysk

- Flag Coat of arms

- Location within Poland
- Coordinates: 53°9′9″N 17°16′4″E
- Country: Poland
- Voivodeship: Greater Poland
- County: Piła
- Gmina: Wyrzysk
- First mentioned: 1326
- Town rights: fifteenth century

Government
  - Mayor: Marcin Piszczek

Area
  - Total: 4.12 km^{2} (1.59 sq mi)
- Elevation: 90 m (300 ft)

Population (2006)
  - Total: 5,234
  - Density: 1,270/km^{2} (3,290/sq mi)
- Time zone: UTC+1 (CET)
  - Summer (DST): UTC+2 (CEST)
- Postal code: 89-300
- Area code: +48 67
- Car plates: PP
- Website: http://www.wyrzysk.pl

Wyrzysk ([ˈvɨʐɨsk]; German: Wirsitz) is a town in north-central Poland with 5,263 (2004) inhabitants, situated in Piła County, Greater Poland Voivodeship.

== Geographic location ==
Wyrzysk is located in the ethnocultural region of Krajna in northern Greater Poland, administratively it is part of the Greater Poland Voivodeship.

== History ==
The Wyrzysk area was established first by East Germanic settlement at the beginning of the first millennium A.D. In the Middle Ages the Noteć became a natural border between the regions of Greater Poland and Pomerania, and the area became part of the emerging Polish state in the 10th century under the Piast dynasty. Later on, it long resisted the expansion of the German margraves, and since the 13th century also the Teutonic Knights. With time, local people adopted the Polish name Krajna for the area to the north of the Noteć. Eventually Polish ruler Bolesław III Wrymouth (1106–1138) conquered the castles on the Noteć and incorporated Krajna into the Kingdom of Poland for the next 700 years.

The first preserved mention of Wyrzysk dates back to 1326; the name of the place was then recorded in the so-called Greater Poland Codex. Wyrzysk was probably granted the royal charter before 1450; in 1565 it became a town under the so-called Magdeburg law. Administratively, it was located in the Kalisz Voivodeship in the Greater Poland Province. As a result of series of wars in the second half of 17th century and beginning of 18th Wyrzysk became in fact a village.

Wyrzysk was annexed by Prussia in 1772 in the First Partition of Poland. The town rights were renewed in 1773 by the Prussian King Frederick the Great who made the town a centre administering the construction of the Bydgoszcz Canal and the regulation of the Noteć. After the successful Greater Poland uprising of 1806, it was regained by Poles and included within the short-lived Duchy of Warsaw. In 1815 it was reannexed by Prussia as a result of Congress of Vienna. It remained Prussian until the end of First World War.

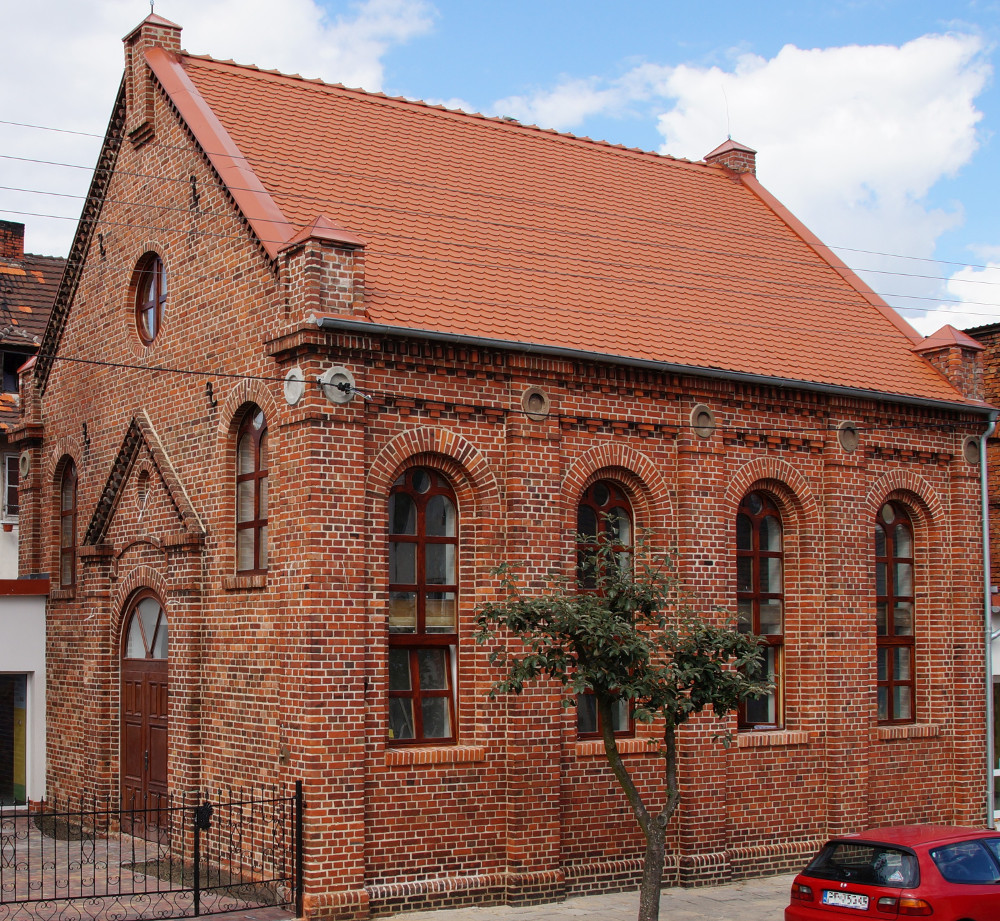
Old synagogue

The Prussian monarch and his successors aimed at Germanisation of the annexed lands. The methods included the ban on Polish language, introduction of Prussian administration and German language and education, encouraging and supporting Prussian settlement while discouraging any further Polish settlement in the area, as well as purchasing estates from the Polish gentry. Wyrzysk and some surrounding areas were sold by Karol Rydzyński, Roch Sypniewski and Maria Samostrzelecka to King Frederick II The Great in 1773. In 1818 Wyrzysk became the seat of a county in the Grand Duchy of Posen, and from 1871 it was part of the German Empire. After years of Germanisation, when the area became increasingly populated by Germans, the Prussians abolished the law of corvée at the beginning of the 19th century. Polish resistance to Prussian rule accelerated the economic development and progress, especially in agriculture. Conflicts arose especially during the Kulturkampf period. The pressure of Germanisation and flood of German settlers encountered growing resistance from the discriminated Polish population of Krajna, who clung to their native language and the Roman Catholic religion. This found expression among decreasing Polish population in the establishment of patriotic Polish associations, choirs, sports clubs, banks and self-help organizations.

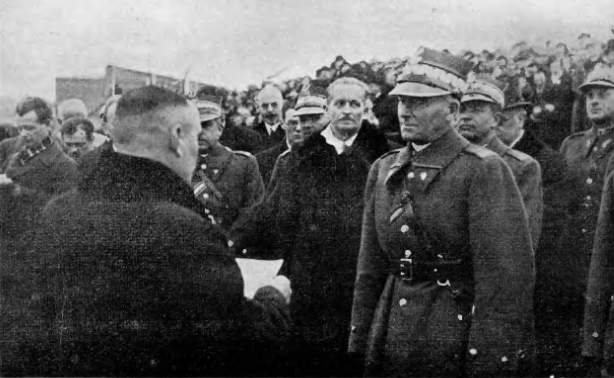
Marshal Edward Rydz-Śmigły in Wyrzysk in 1936

Wyrzysk was incorporated into a newly reborn Poland in 1919 by the Treaty of Versailles, but merely 20 years later, with the beginning of World War II, the town was yet again occupied by Germany and annexed into the new Third Reich province of Reichsgau Danzig-West Prussia as the seat of the county/district (kreis) of Wirsitz. In October and November 1939, as part of the Intelligenzaktion, the German gendarmerie and Selbstschutz carried out mass arrests of local Poles, who then were imprisoned in the local court prison. Many Poles from Wyrzysk, including teachers and priests, were among hundreds of Poles massacred by the Germans in the nearby village of Paterek in October and November 1939. In 1940–1942, the occupiers also carried out expulsions of Poles, whose houses were then handed over to German colonists as part of the Lebensraum policy. The local Polish police chief and further three Polish policemen from Wyrzysk were murdered by the Russians in the Katyn massacre in 1940. A forced labor subcamp of the Stalag XX-A prisoner-of-war camp was operated by the Germans in the town. One of its prisoners was British actor Sam Kydd, who, as he wrote in his memoir, even learned various Polish phrases through contact with the local Polish population. In 1944, the Germans deported 300 Polish forced laborers aged 15–50 from the county to a forced labour camp in Jajkowo. The town was taken by the Red Army in January 1945 and returned to Poland after the war, although with a Soviet-installed communist regime, which stayed in power until the Fall of Communism in the 1980s.

In the following years, the Polish anti-communist resistance was active in the town and its environs, including the nationwide Freedom and Independence Association and Home Army, and several local organizations. On 24 May 1946, the Polish resistance liberated 43 prisoners from a local communist prison.

== Demographics ==
Historical population

Year	Pop.	±%
1890	1,577	—
1900	1,672	+6.0%
1910	1,660	−0.7%
1921	1,305	−21.4%
1931	1,642	+25.8%

Year	Pop.	±%
1939	1,898	+15.6%
1950	2,947	+55.3%
1960	3,674	+24.7%
2010	5,232	+42.4%

== Transport ==
Wyrzysk used to be cut through by national road No. 10 leading from Szczecin to Warsaw but a bypass has now been built. This bypass connects Wyrzysk with Piła (37 km) and Bydgoszcz (55 km). The railway station in nearby Osiek nad Notecią also provides a railway connection with Piła (39 km) and Bydgoszcz (48 km).

== Sports ==
The local football club is Łobzonka Wyrzysk. It competes in the lower leagues.

== Famous people ==
- Rudolf Bauer (artist) (1889–1953), German-born painter
- Wernher von Braun (1912–1977), rocket physicist, astronautics engineer
