= Szydłowo, Piła County =

Szydłowo
- Village
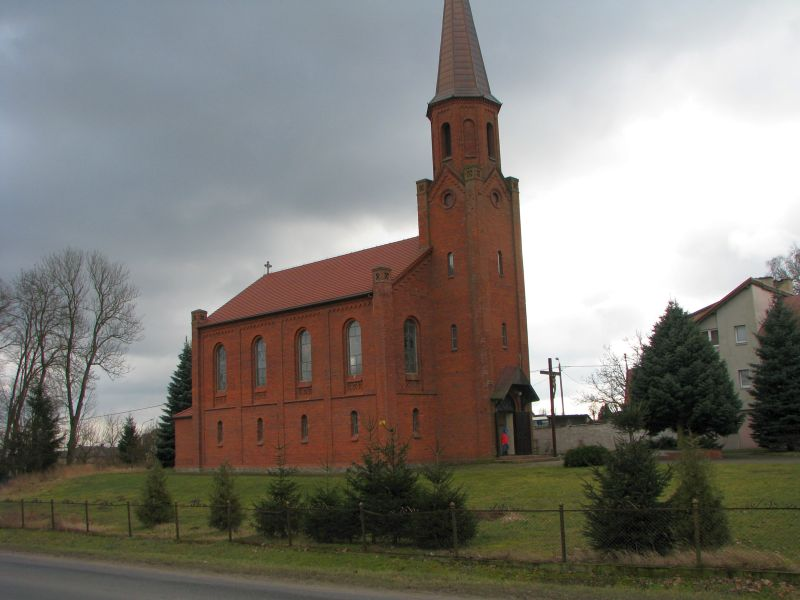
- Former Lutheran, now Catholic Church of Our Lady or Perpetual Help

- Location within Poland
- Coordinates: 53°9′44″N 16°37′0″E
- Country: Poland
- Voivodeship: Greater Poland
- County: Piła
- Gmina: Szydłowo

Population
  - Total: 750

Szydłowo [ʂɨˈdwɔvɔ] (German: Groß Wittenberg) is a village in Piła County, Greater Poland Voivodeship, in west-central Poland. It is the seat of the gmina (administrative district) called Gmina Szydłowo.
