= Dobrzyca, Piła County =

Dobrzyca
- Village
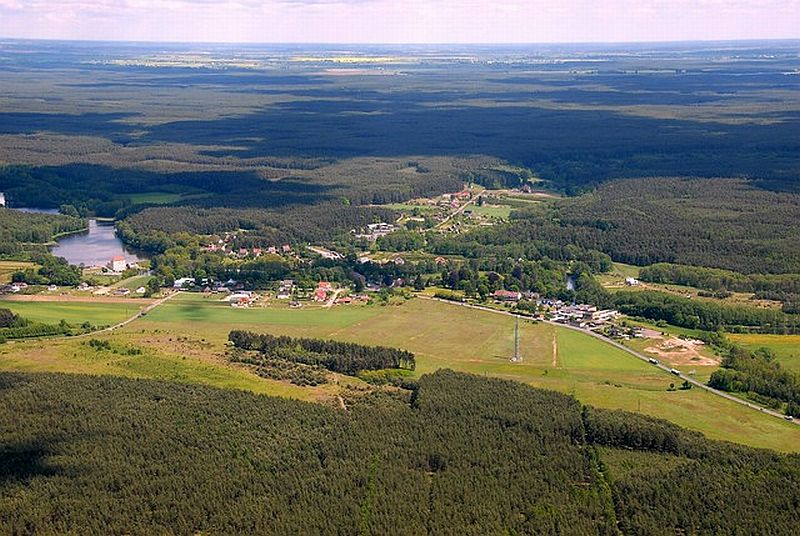
- Aerial view of Dobrzyca

- Location within Poland
- Coordinates: 53°13′9″N 16°47′14″E
- Country: Poland
- Voivodeship: Greater Poland
- County: Piła
- Gmina: Szydłowo
- Population: 280
- Time zone: UTC+1 (CET)
  - Summer (DST): UTC+2 (CEST)
- Vehicle registration: PP

Dobrzyca [dɔˈbʐɨt͡sa] (German: Borkendorf) is a village in the administrative district of Gmina Szydłowo, within Piła County, Greater Poland Voivodeship, in west-central Poland. It is located in the ethnocultural region of Krajna.

== History ==
The territory became a part of the emerging Polish state under its first historic ruler Mieszko I in the 10th century. Dobrzyca was a royal village of the Kingdom of Poland, administratively located in the Nakło County in the Kalisz Voivodeship. in the Greater Poland Province. It was annexed by Prussia in the First Partition of Poland in 1772, and from 1871 to 1945 it was also part of Germany.
