= Płytnica, Piła County =

Płytnica
- Settlement
- Location within Poland
- Coordinates: 53°17′42″N 16°45′2″E
- Country: Poland
- Voivodeship: Greater Poland
- County: Piła
- Gmina: Szydłowo

Płytnica [pwɨtˈnit͡sa] is a settlement in the administrative district of Gmina Szydłowo, within Piła County, Greater Poland Voivodeship, in west-central Poland.
