= Gmina Kaczory =

Gmina Kaczory Kaczory Commune
- Gmina
- Coat of arms
- Interactive map of Gmina Kaczory
- Coordinates (Kaczory): 53°6′N 16°53′E
- Country: Poland
- Voivodeship: Greater Poland
- County: Piła
- Seat: Kaczory

Area
  - Total: 150.01 km^{2} (57.92 sq mi)

Population (2006)
  - Total: 7,526
  - Density: 50.17/km^{2} (129.9/sq mi)
- Website: http://www.kaczory.com.pl/

Gmina Kaczory is a rural gmina (administrative district) in Piła County, Greater Poland Voivodeship, in west-central Poland. Its seat is the village of Kaczory, which lies approximately 12 kilometres (7 mi) south-east of Piła and 78 km (48 mi) north of the regional capital Poznań.

The gmina covers an area of 150.01 square kilometres (57.9 sq mi), and as of 2006 its total population is 7,526.

== Villages ==
Gmina Kaczory contains the villages and settlements of Brodna, Byszewice, Dziembówko, Dziembowo, Jeziorki, Kaczory, Krzewina, Morzewo, Prawomyśl, Równopole, Rzadkowo, Śmiłowo and Zelgniewo.

== Neighbouring gminas ==
Gmina Kaczory is bordered by the town of Piła and by the gminas of Chodzież, Krajenka, Miasteczko Krajeńskie, Ujście and Wysoka.
