= Miasteczko Krajeńskie =

- Town
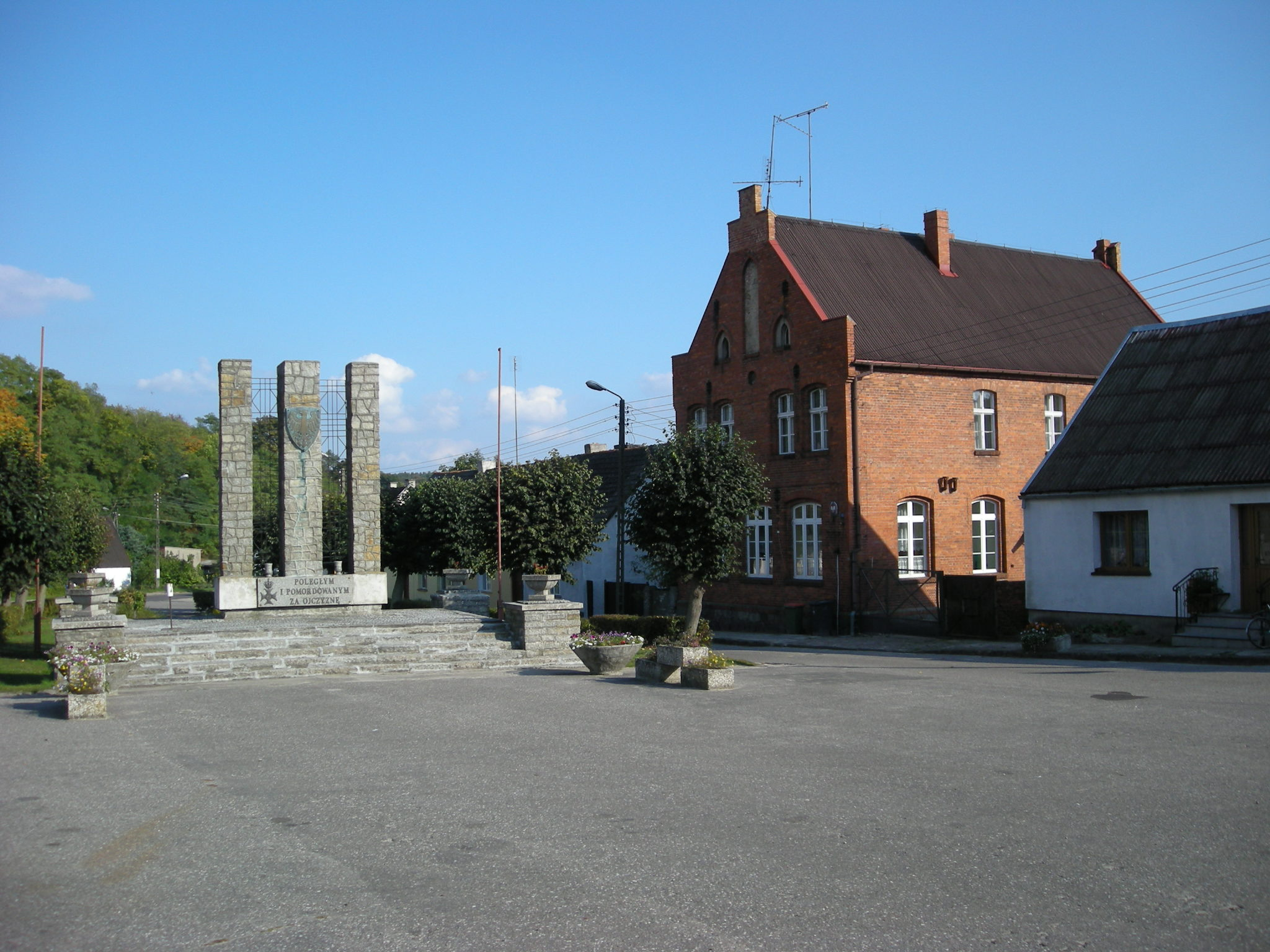
- Center of the town

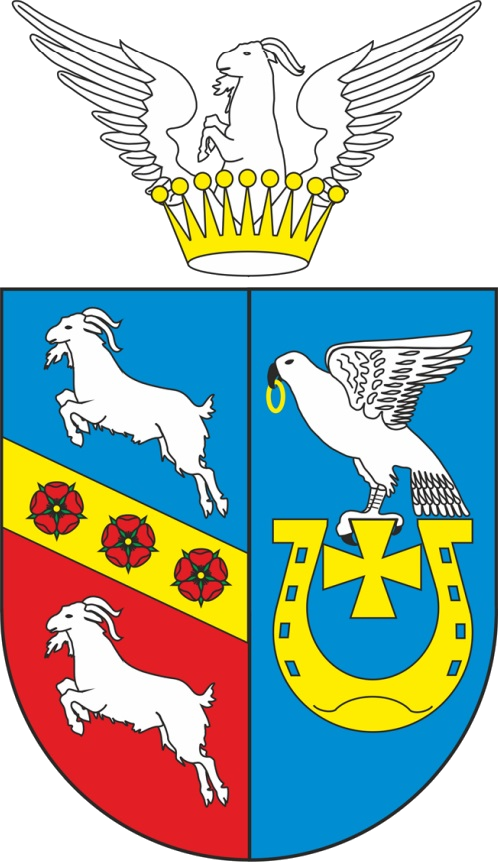
- Coat of arms

- Location within Poland
- Coordinates: 53°5′N 17°0′E
- Country: Poland
- Voivodeship: Greater Poland
- County: Piła
- Gmina: Miasteczko Krajeńskie
- Town rights: Before 1457

Population
  - Total: 1,163
- Time zone: UTC+1 (CET)
  - Summer (DST): UTC+2 (CEST)
- Vehicle registration: PP

Miasteczko Krajeńskie [mjasˈtɛt͡ʂkɔ kraˈjɛɲskʲɛ] is a town in Piła County, Greater Poland Voivodeship, in west-central Poland. It is the seat of the gmina (administrative district) called Gmina Miasteczko Krajeńskie.

The town has a population of 1,163.

== History ==
Miasteczko is a former private town, once located in the Kalisz Voivodeship in the Greater Poland Province of the Kingdom of Poland. The adjective Krajeńskie was added to the name after the historical-ethnocultural region of Krajna, within which it is located.

Polish folk hero Michał Drzymała is buried at the local cemetery.

Following the German-Soviet invasion of Poland, which started World War II in September 1939, it was occupied by Germany until 1945. The local Polish police chief was murdered by the Russians in the Katyn massacre in 1940.

In 1945, the German occupation ended, and town was restored to Poland, although with a Soviet-installed communist regime, which stayed in power until the Fall of Communism in the 1980s. In the following years, the Polish anti-communist resistance was active in the town and its environs, including the Home Army.

== Demographics ==
Historical population

Year	Pop.	±%
1871	1,116	—
1880	940	−15.8%
1890	932	−0.9%
1900	1,058	+13.5%
1910	1,110	+4.9%

Year	Pop.	±%
1925	1,154	+4.0%
1939	1,218	+5.5%
1950	1,059	−13.1%
1960	1,236	+16.7%
