= Kaczory, Piła County =

Kaczory
- Town
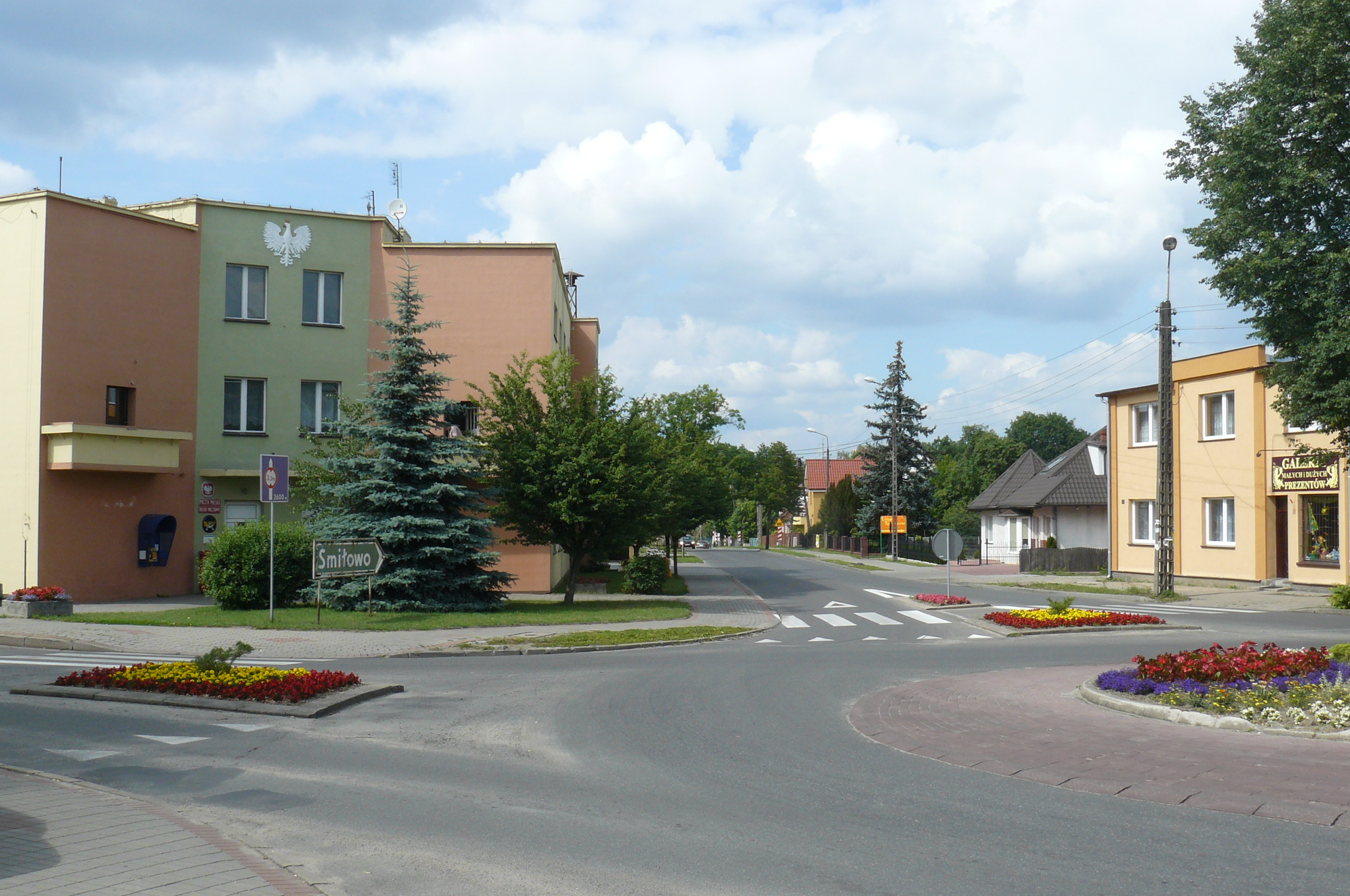
- Centre of the town with gmina administration building

- Flag Coat of arms

- Location within Poland
- Coordinates: 53°6′N 16°53′E
- Country: Poland
- Voivodeship: Greater Poland
- County: Piła
- Gmina: Kaczory

Population
  - Total: 2,743
- Time zone: UTC+1 (CET)
  - Summer (DST): UTC+2 (CEST)
- Vehicle registration: PP

Kaczory [kaˈt͡ʂɔrɨ] is a town in Piła County, Greater Poland Voivodeship, in west-central Poland. It is the seat of the gmina (administrative district) called Gmina Kaczory.
