= Gmina Miasteczko Krajeńskie =

Gmina Miasteczko Krajeńskie Miasteczko Krajeńskie Commune
- Gmina
- Coat of arms
- Interactive map of Gmina Miasteczko Krajeńskie
- Coordinates (Miasteczko Krajeńskie): 53°5′N 17°0′E
- Country: Poland
- Voivodeship: Greater Poland
- County: Piła
- Seat: Miasteczko Krajeńskie

Area
  - Total: 70.72 km^{2} (27.31 sq mi)

Population (2006)
  - Total: 3,204
  - Density: 45.31/km^{2} (117.3/sq mi)
- Website: http://miasteczko.terramail.pl

Gmina Miasteczko Krajeńskie is an urban-rural gmina (administrative district) in Piła County, Greater Poland Voivodeship, in west-central Poland. Its seat is the village of Miasteczko Krajeńskie, which lies approximately 20 kilometres (12 mi) south-east of Piła and 77 km (48 mi) north of the regional capital Poznań.

The gmina covers an area of 70.72 square kilometres (27.3 sq mi), and as of 2006 its total population is 3,204.

== Villages ==
Apart from the town of Miasteczko Krajeńskie, Gmina Miasteczko Krajeńskie contains the villages and settlements of Arentowo, Brzostowo, Grabionna, Grabówno, Miasteczko-Huby, Okaliniec, Solnówek and Wolsko.

== Neighbouring gminas ==
Gmina Miasteczko Krajeńskie is bordered by the gminas of Białośliwie, Chodzież, Kaczory, Szamocin and Wysoka.
