= Czaplino, Greater Poland Voivodeship =

Czaplino
- Settlement
- Location within Poland
- Coordinates: 53°13′42″N 16°42′31″E
- Country: Poland
- Voivodeship: Greater Poland
- County: Piła
- Gmina: Szydłowo

Czaplino [t͡ʂaˈplinɔ] is a settlement in the administrative district of Gmina Szydłowo, within Piła County, Greater Poland Voivodeship, in west-central Poland.
