= Lazar Dobricz =

Bulgarian circus artist

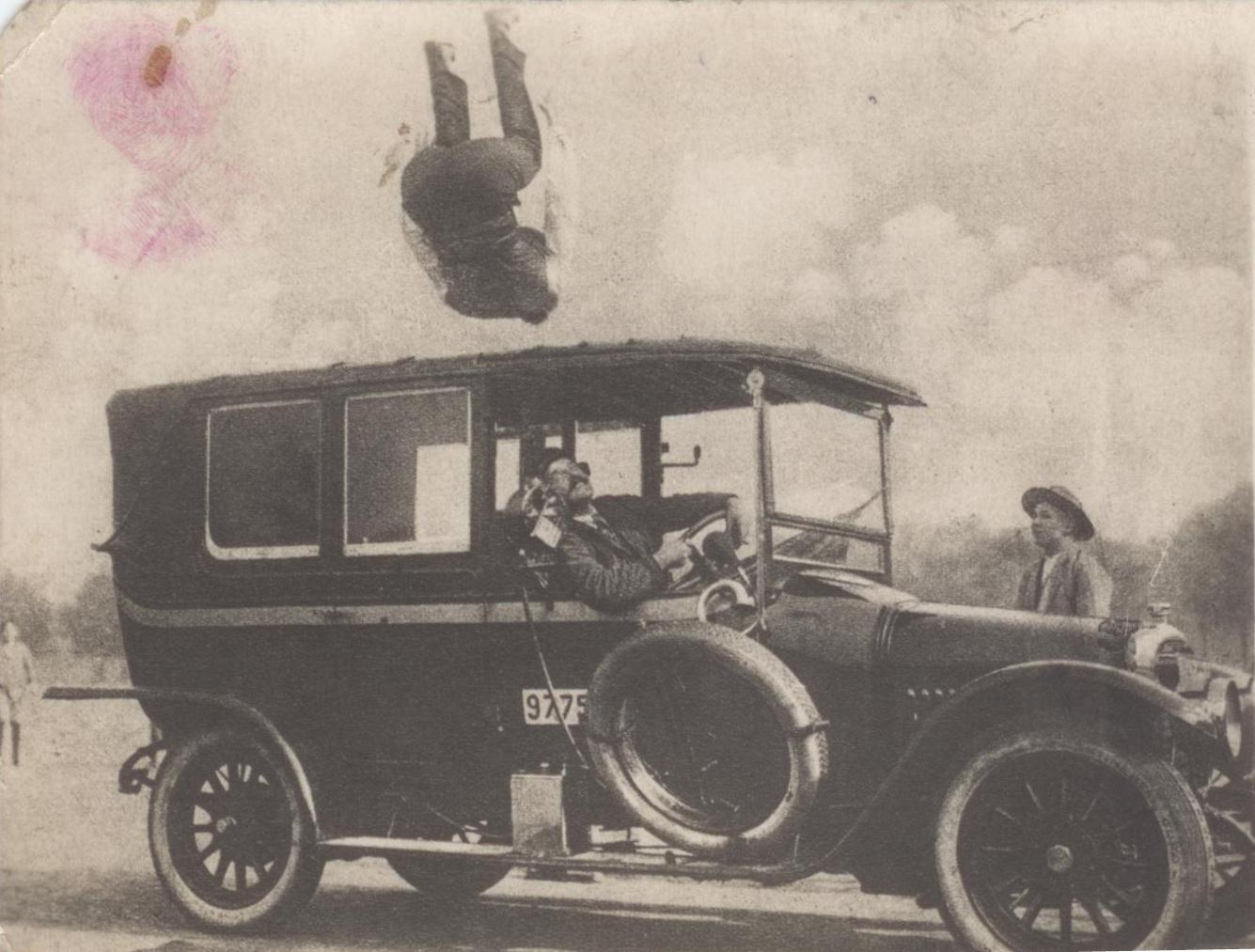
Dobrich performing jump over an automobile, Bordeaux, 1908

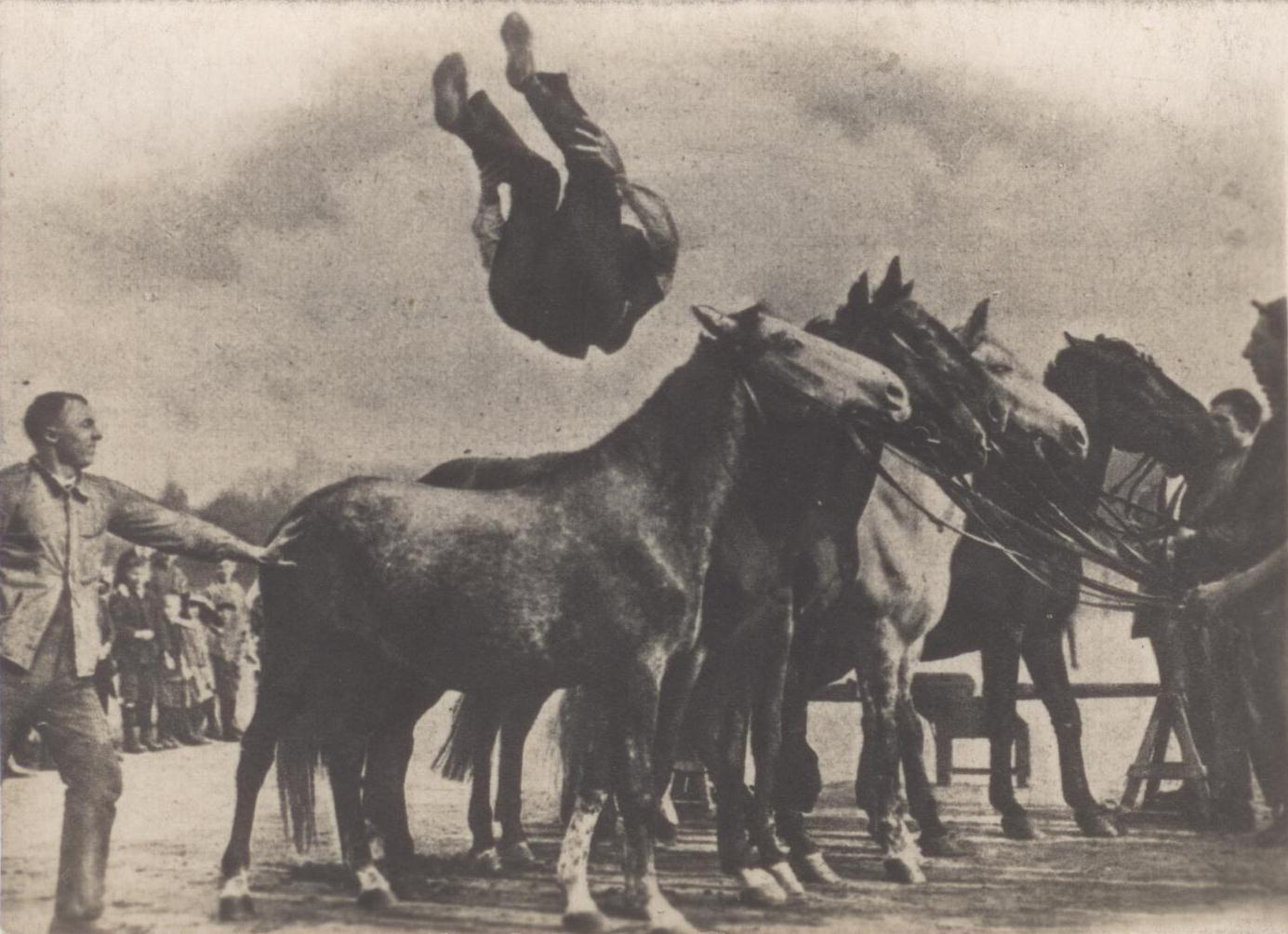
Jump over five horses, Berlin, 1912

Lazar Dobricz (1881–1970) was a Bulgarian circus artist, one of the first and most prominent circus performers of Bulgaria.
