= Piła County =

Piła County Powiat pilski
- County
- Flag Coat of arms

- Location within the voivodeship
- Coordinates (Piła): 53°9′N 16°44′E
- Country: Poland
- Voivodeship: Greater Poland
- Seat: Piła
- Gminas: Total 9 (incl. 1 urban): Piła; Gmina Białośliwie; Gmina Kaczory; Gmina Łobżenica; Gmina Miasteczko Krajeńskie; Gmina Szydłowo; Gmina Ujście; Gmina Wyrzysk; Gmina Wysoka

Area
  - Total: 1,267.1 km^{2} (489.2 sq mi)

Population (2006)
  - Total: 137,099
  - Density: 108.20/km^{2} (280.23/sq mi)
  - Urban: 90,099
  - Rural: 47,000
- Car plates: PP
- Website: www.powiat.pila.pl

Piła County (Polish: powiat pilski) is a unit of territorial administration and local government (powiat) in Greater Poland Voivodeship, west-central Poland. It came into being on January 1, 1999, as a result of the Polish local government reforms passed in 1998. Its administrative seat and largest town is Piła, which lies 85 kilometres (53 mi) north of the regional capital Poznań. The county contains four other towns: Wyrzysk, 36 km (22 mi) east of Piła, Ujście, 10 km (6 mi) south of Piła, Łobżenica, 37 km (23 mi) east of Piła, and Wysoka, 25 km (16 mi) east of Piła.

The county covers an area of 1,267.1 square kilometres (489.2 sq mi). As of 2006 its total population is 137,099, out of which Piła is home to 75,044 people, Wyrzysk to 5,234, Ujście to 3,899, Łobżenica to 3,172, Wysoka to 2,750, and the rural population is 47,000.

== Neighbouring counties ==
Piła County is bordered by Złotów County to the north, Sępólno County and Nakło County to the east, Wągrowiec County to the south-east, Chodzież County and Czarnków-Trzcianka County to the south, and Wałcz County to the north-west.

== Administrative divisions ==
The county is subdivided into nine gminas (one urban, five urban-rural and three rural). These are listed in the following table, in descending order of population.

Gmina	Type	Area (km^{2})	Population (2006)	Seat
Piła	urban	102.7	75,044	
Gmina Wyrzysk	urban-rural	160.8	14,132	Wyrzysk
Gmina Łobżenica	urban-rural	190.7	9,853	Łobżenica
Gmina Ujście	urban-rural	126.0	8,009	Ujście
Gmina Szydłowo	rural	267.5	7,594	Szydłowo
Gmina Kaczory	rural	150.0	7,526	Kaczory
Gmina Wysoka	urban-rural	123.0	6,890	Wysoka
Gmina Białośliwie	rural	75.7	4,847	Białośliwie
Gmina Miasteczko Krajeńskie	urban-rural	70.7	3,204	Miasteczko Krajeńskie
