= Feliks Sypniewski =

Polish painter and artist

- Feliks Sypniewski
- Born: 1830; Pępowo (Sypniewski family estate), Poland
- Died: 1903 (aged 72–73); Paris, France
- Known for: Painting

Feliks Sypniewski (1830–1903) was a Polish painter and artist who painted mostly historic battle scenes drawn from the borderlands of Poland and Germany, and his most favourite animal - horses.

== Early life ==
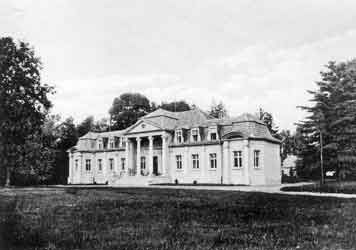
Sypniewski's Pempowo estate, place of Feliks' birth, photograph taken in 1890

It is unclear under what circumstances the estate of Feliks Sypniewski's parents was lost in the aftermath of 1830 November Uprising, but he was already born on or after Christmas on the extended family's Sypniewski estate at Skoraszewice near Pempowo (hence the often confusion with year of his birth: because the uprising have ended in 1831, and because of different calendars used in Congress Poland under Russian occupation, and in Grand Duchy of Poznań under German occupation).
The enormous family estate is where, at early childhood, he developed riding skills and his lifelong fascination with horses. He was home schooled by private teachers, and his early painting teacher was Adolf Piwarski (son of Jan Piwarski, another Polish painter and professor of art), at that time young student himself under Sypniewski family patronage.
Mostly self-taught, by the age of 20, Feliks Sypniewski was already established as excellent pencil, ink wash and watercolor portraitist and painter (his early "biblical series" of illustrations was very sought after by various publishers), as well as splendid equestrian.

== Adulthood ==
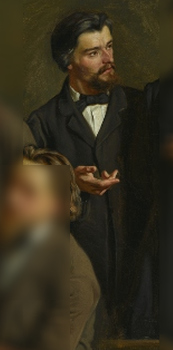
Portrait of Feliks Sypniewski in 1858 (at age 28) by Antoni Murzynowski (crop of Murzynowski's painting "Wojciech Gerson and five artists in his Warsaw workshop")

He lived and worked mostly in Poznań and Warsaw (both of these Polish cities were located in 2 separate countries after the Partitions of Poland and Vienna Congress), and by the age of 30 he was considered one of the most renowned Polish painters in his times.
Very sociable and greatly popular not only in high society circles, also regarded as very handsome, Feliks was known for not letting go of any chance of romance. As a result of his impulsive love affairs, his first son Kazimierz was born to a lady in Warsaw (occupied by and part of Russia at that time), while Feliks was marrying another pregnant lady in Poznań (occupied by and part of Kingdom of Prussia at that time). It is unknown when (if at all) they had divorce, but around 1875-1880 Feliks appears to be a bachelor again. By the time he moved to Paris in 1890 he had several children, albeit only one legitimate son.
Ironically, he died in his Paris house alone, and was buried at the famous Père Lachaise Cemetery under a false name (probably due to mispronunciation of his Polish surname).

== January Uprising Incident ==
When January Uprising exploded over Congress Poland in 1863, Feliks Sypniewski together with cousin Heinrich Sypniewski rushed to join Polish troops. However, having no military training whatsoever, Feliks was almost killed in a Russian ambush near the village of Klecz (or near the battle of Klecz). He barely survived and escaped alone thanks to his great horse riding skills. Following this near-death experience, and possibly realizing his lack of any military usefulness, he made no further attempts of joining the uprising while it lasted.
It is unknown was he involved in other ways for the restitution of Poland during uprising, but there are no known documents of his political activity in that time.

== Paintings ==
His oil on canvas Knights From a Religious Order, also called Teutonic Knights after the Battle of Grunwald, was taken by German Wehrmacht from the Lublin Museum in Poland during World War II German occupation. It was inventoried by the Germans at the beginning of occupation, numbered III BR/7, and possibly taken to Germany. It is now considered lost. This painting records the Teutonic Knights' retreat after the Battle of Grunwald (near town of Tannenberg in German, or near town of Grunwald in Polish). On the morning of 15 July 1410, the armies of King Wladyslaw Jagiello met them there. It is worth to mention that even though most of Sypniewski clan (the ancestors of Feliks Sypniewski) and their estates were located within State of the Teutonic Order at that time, they have supported Polish-Lithuanian King Jagiello and took active part in this battle against Teutonic Order.

In the painting Prince Jozef Sypniewski we can see to the left a Polish Lancer of the French Imperial Garde, and to the right the uniform of the Grenadier a'cheval. This event took place between 1804 and 1814, during the Napoleonic Occupation of Poland. The painting itself hasn't been seen since 1918 when it was stolen by retreating German soldiers, but copy of Sypniewski's original was bought by Mathias Bersolm of the "Society For the Encouragement of the Fine Arts" (Towarzystwo Przyjaciół Sztuk Pięknych). The Society was founded to popularise and promote Polish Art in 1860 during non-existence of Polish state and operated until yet another German occupation of Poland in 1939. Its aim was also to organise educational activities in the arts world, to support artists and organise exhibitions. It built up a collection of Polish art and gave stipends to aspiring Polish artists. Thanks to the TPSP at least the black-and-white photograph of painting's reproduction survived to this day.

== Gallery ==
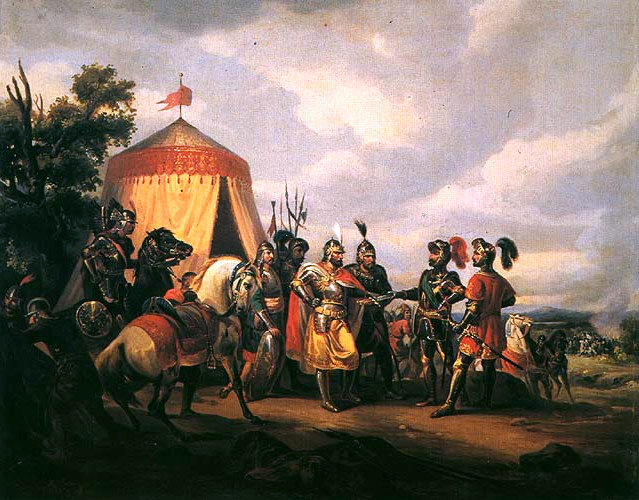
"Before the Battle of Grunwald" (Przed bitwą pod Grunwaldem). Oil on canvas, 1852

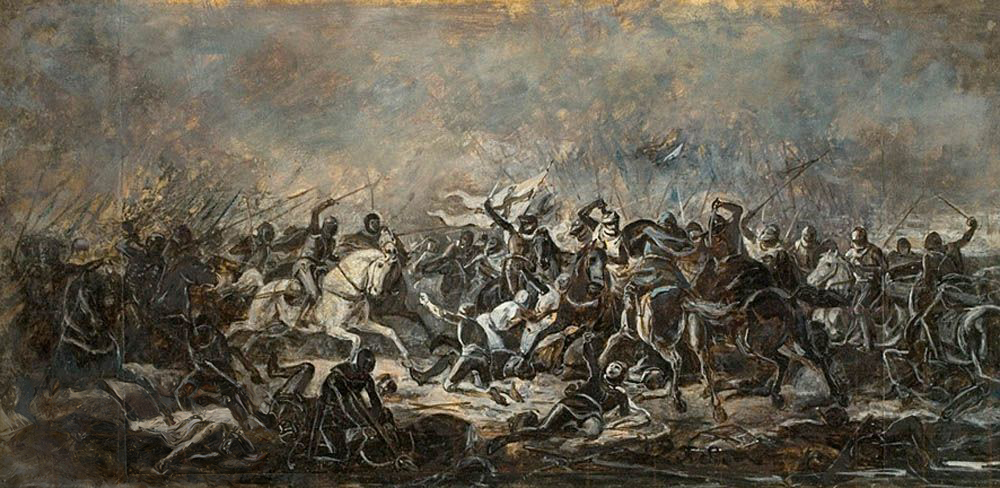
"Battle of Grunwald" (Bitwa pod Grunwaldem). Watercolors, ink wash and pencil mix on paper with cardboard backing, circa 1848-1850

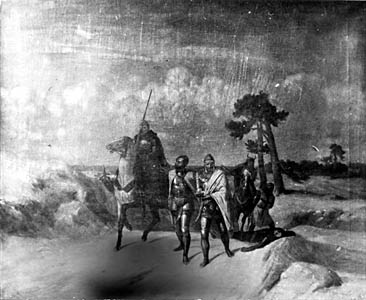
"Teutonic Knights after the Battle of Grunwald" (Po bitwie pod Grunwaldem). Oil on canvas, 1850. Painting has been stolen by Germans in 1945 and disappeared since.

Prince Jozef Sypniewski. (Stolen by Germans in 1918 and never recovered?).

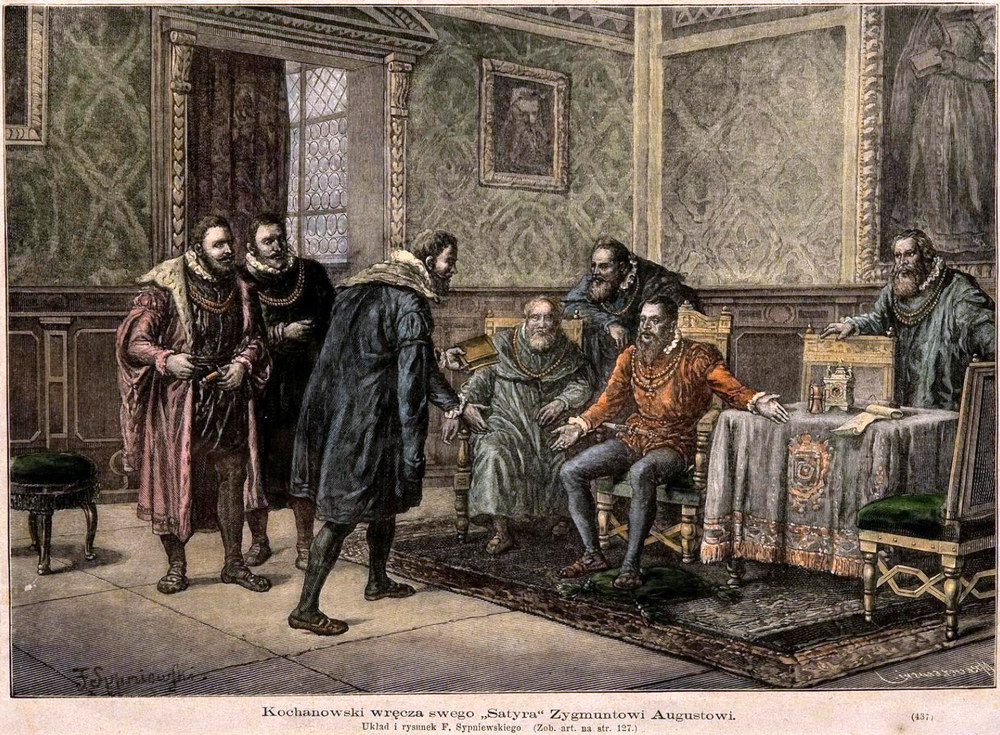
"Poet Kochanowski is handing the Satir to Sigismund II Augustus, King of Poland". Drawing, 1884

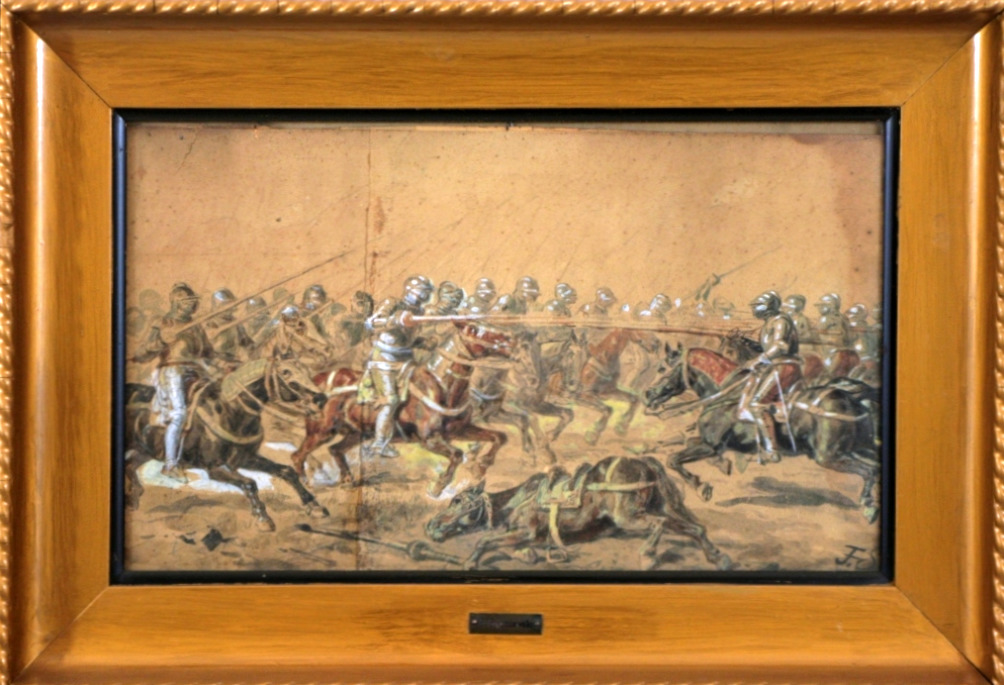
"The Charge" (Szarża). Watercolor on paper, ca.1860

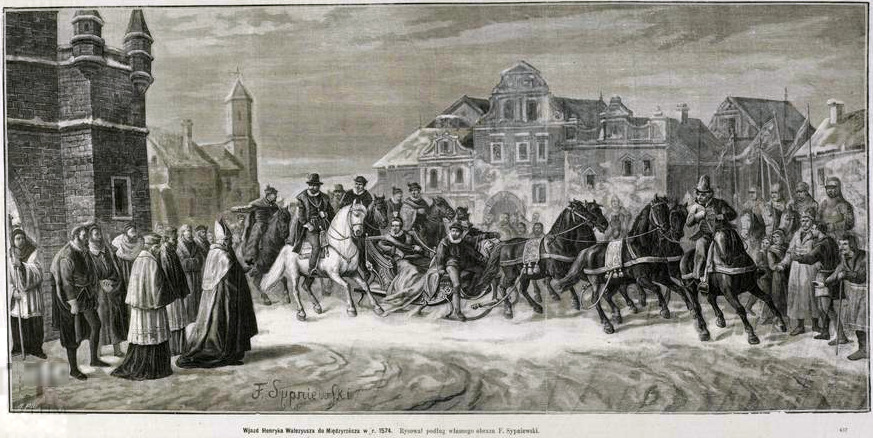
"King Henry of Valois arrives at Miedzyrzecze Castle". Color ink drawing turned into woodcut magazine illustration, 1882.

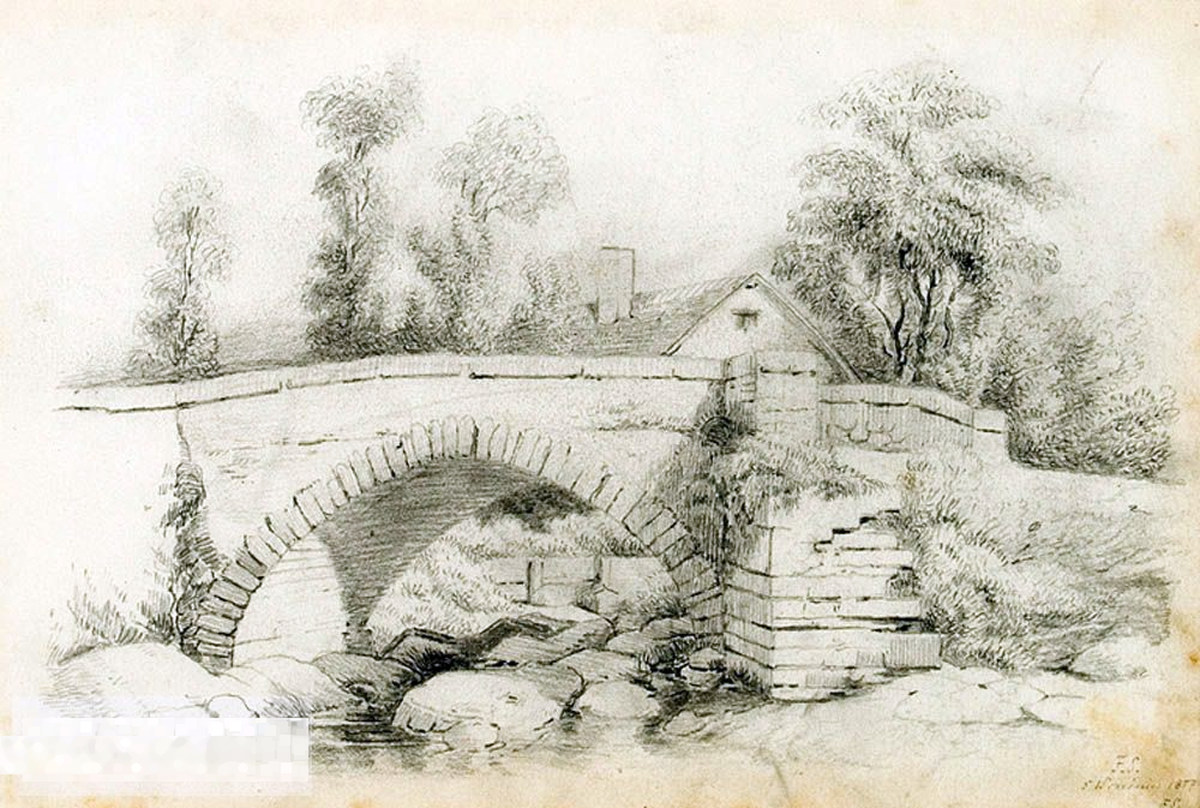
"A Landscape with a Bridge". Pencil on paper, 1857

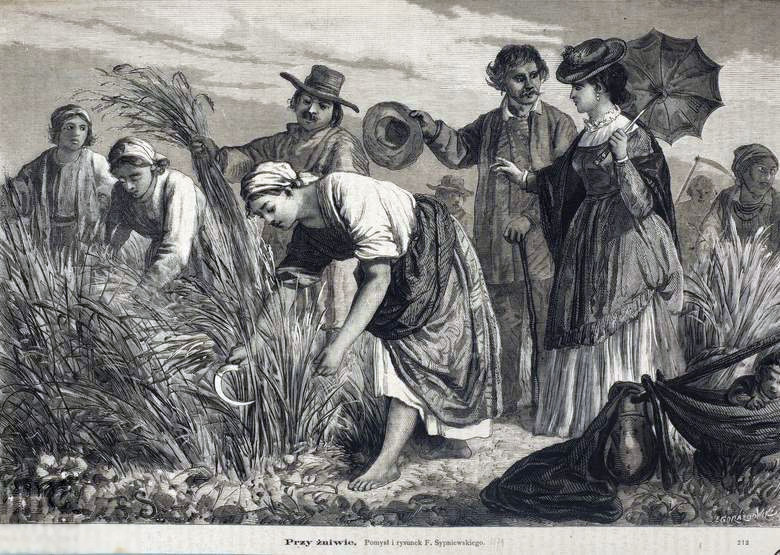
"While harvesting". Color ink turned into woodcut illustration, 1885.

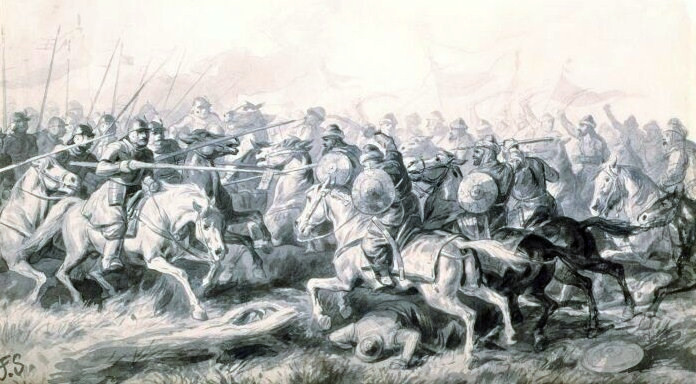
"Battle with Ottoman Turks" (Walka z Turczynem). Watercolor on paper, ca. 1850.

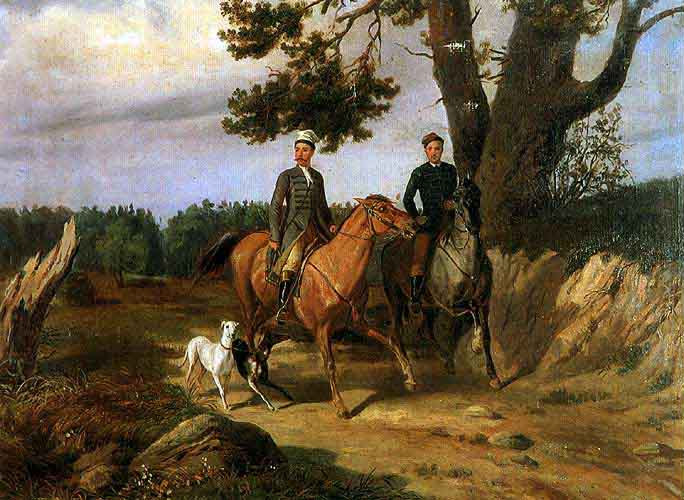
"The Hunt with Greyhounds". Oil on canvas, ca. 1870.

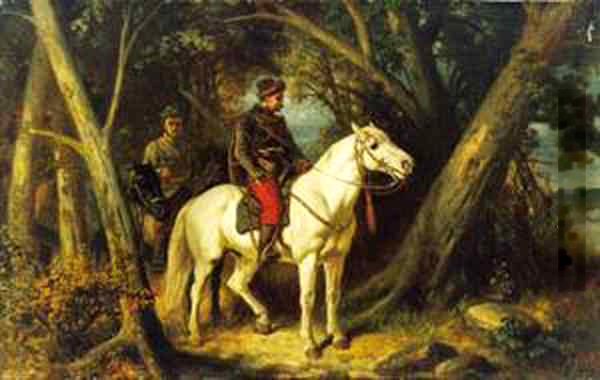
"The Scouts", a.k.a. "The Riders" (Zwiad / Jeźdżcy). Oil on canvas, ca. 1860

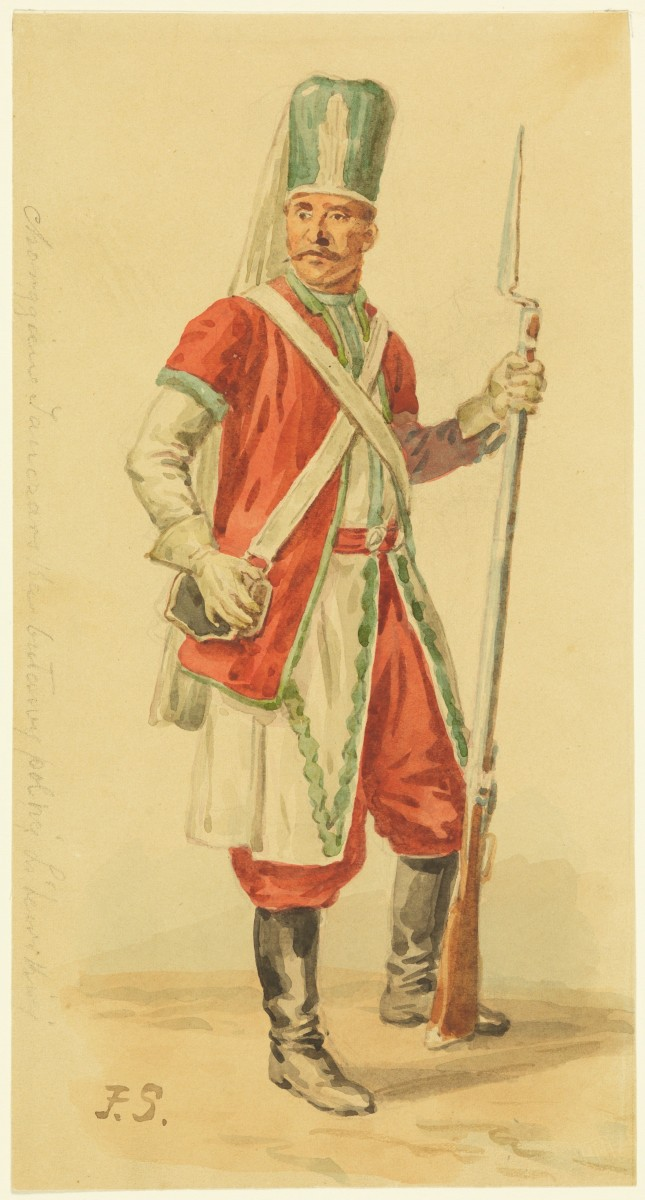
"Janissar of the Lithuanian Troopers Banner". Watercolor on paper, 1851

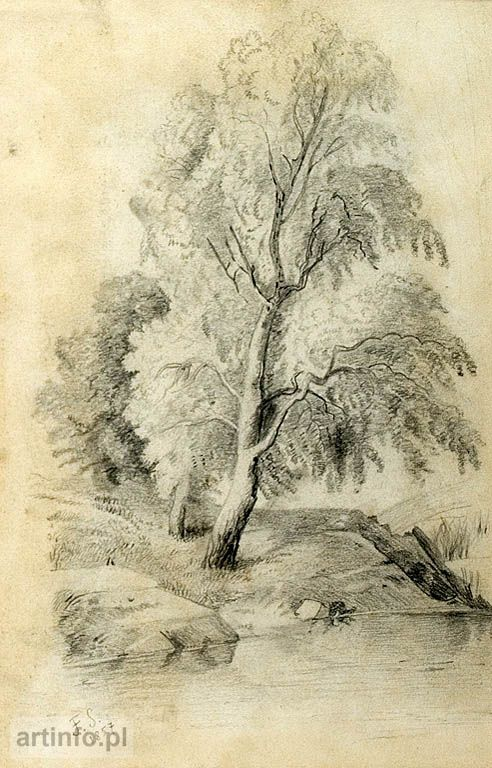
"The Tree". Pencil on paper. 1857

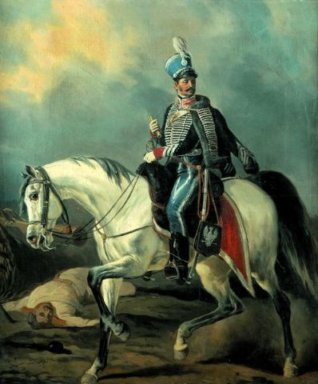
"Equestrian Portrait" a.k.a. "Hussar"

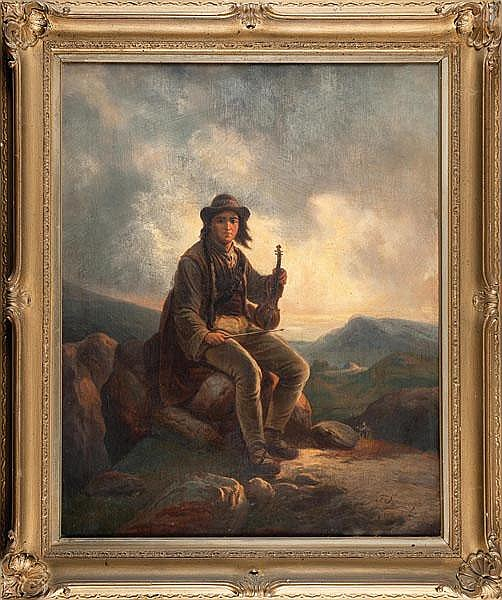
"Young Highlander". Oil on canvas, 1883.

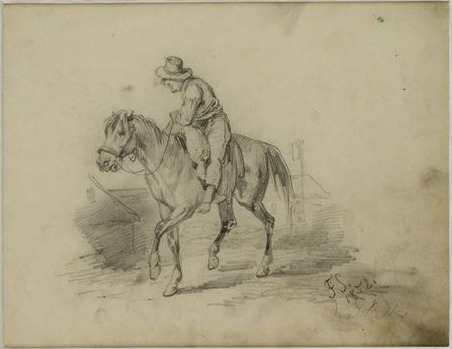
"A Farmhand on Horseback" (Parobek na koniu). Ink on paper, 1852

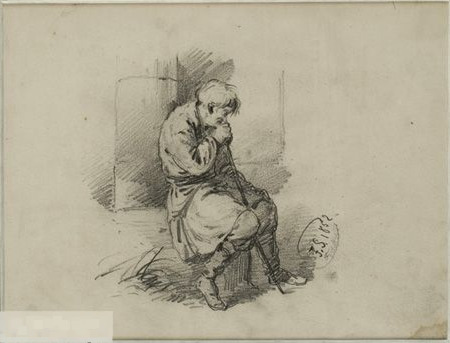
"Sitting Peasant" (Siedzący wieśniak). Ink on paper, 1852

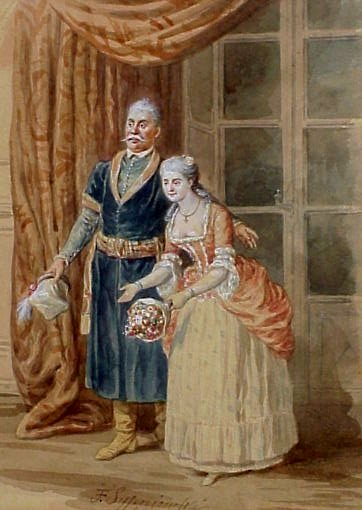
"The Ancestors", a.k.a. "Sypniewskis at Palace in Homel" (sometimes mistakenly titled "Nobleman and Wife" or "Nobleman and Daughter"). Watercolor on paper, ca. 1870

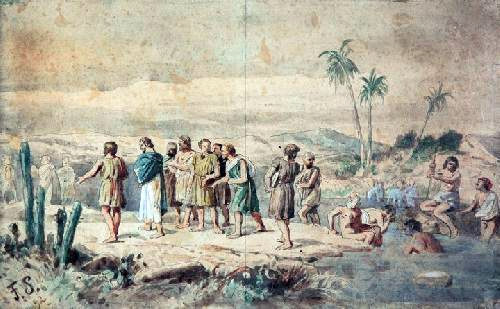
"On the Bank of River Jordan" (Nad Jordanem), 1848. Part of Biblical illustrations series. Color ink on paper.

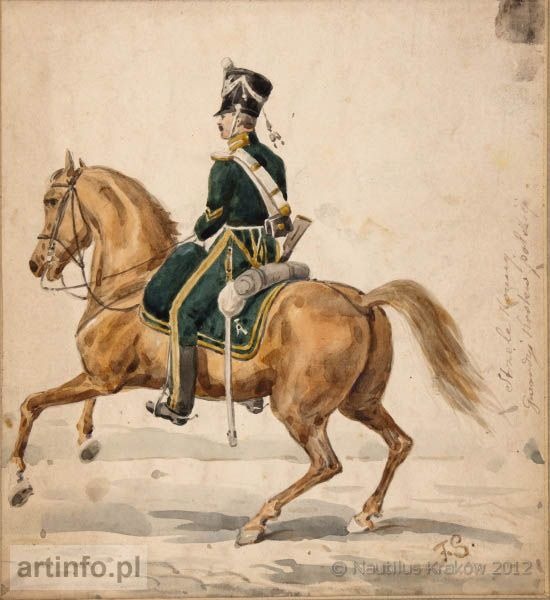
"Mounted Rifleman of Polish Royal Guards". Watercolor on paper.

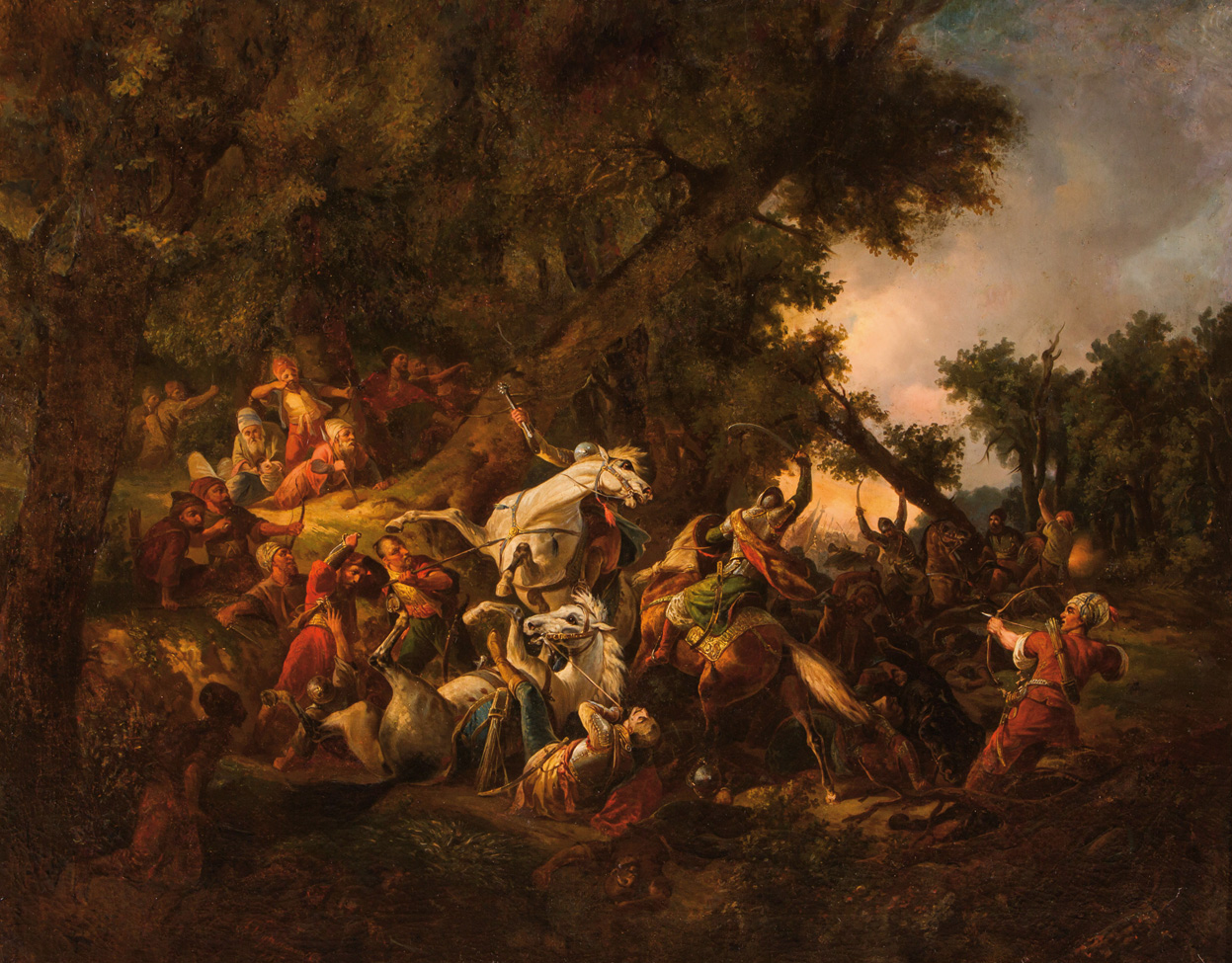
"An Ambush" (Zasadzka). Oil on canvass, 1856.

== See also ==
- Sypniewski

== Sources ==
- Tygodnik Ilustrowany (in Polish). 1859–1890.
- Swieykowski, Emmanuel (1905). Pamiętnik Towarzystwa Przyjaciół Sztuk Pięknych w Krakowie: 1854-1904; 50 lat działalności dla ojczystej sztuki (in Polish). Cracow: TPSP.
- Reszycki, Xawery (1910). Grunwald. Ku pamięci rocznicy z bogatemi ilustracyjami (in Polish).
- Trąmpczyński, Włodzimierz (1911). Wydawnictwo jubileuszowe: Grunwald 1410-1910 (in Polish). A. Zięckowski.
- Gomulicki, Wiktor Teofil (1958). "Pan Tadeusz" w ilustracjach (in Polish). Warsaw: Krajowa Agencja Wydawnicza.
- Karwowska-Bajdor, Alicja (1984). Warszawa wczorajsza (in Polish). Warsaw: Czytelnik.
- Kwiatkowski, Marek (1991). Polscy malarze koni (in Polish). Warsaw: Krajowa Agencja Wydawnicza.
- Felix Sypniewski - Polish Artist An article by Margaret Odrowaz-Sypniewski, B.F.A.(2000)
