= Sypniewski =

Polish surname

Sypniewski (feminine Sypniewska) is a Polish surname centered on the Oder region where families bearing this surname are still found today. Sypniewskis can also be found all over the world, particularly in the United States, Brazil, and Germany.

"Sypniewski" roughly translates as "one who originates from Sypniewo' – (that is from Sypien's settlement). There are several manorial estates which bear the name of Sypniewo or a similar spelling as in the German "Zippnow".

Sypniewski Prince Jozef

== Etymology ==
The etymology of 'Sypien' indicates the use of water in connection with the production or use of a clay vessel, or fish trap, in the breeding or catching of fish. The origins point to a clan that lived either in a place fortified with a wooden castle on or near water (rivers/lakes), and that kept game and fishing. Most of the old manors with the original name Sypien (see Sypniewo or Zippnow) are located near a lake or river.In German, the name is commonly translated as 'Seeort' (place on the lake) and in English it is similar to the name Timberlake.

== Nobility patent, manorial estates and origins ==
The Sypniewskis belong to Pomeranian nobility, Polish Szlachta (nobility), Prussian nobility, and later to German and Austrian nobilities (after partition of Poland), and, although mentioned already c. 1390 and earlier (as Siebnitz and/or Zipniv Pomeranian nobility), obtained a formal Polish nobility patent in writing from the king Casimir IV Jagiellon, who granted them the right to keep and use the Odrowąż coat of arms in 1480. Zlota Ksiega Szlachty Polskiej ("Golden Book of Polish Nobility") states that the Sypniewski – Odrowaz arms are said to have come from the Podgórze region, recorded around 1190 (there are still few Sypniewski families owning land and living in this area today). Their further nobility confirmations through Bonifacius Sypniewski is dated in 1483 and confirmed in German Nobility Book. A Jan Sypniewski resettled in the Brzesko-Litewskie province (presently part of Lithuania, back then center of Polish–Lithuanian Commonwealth), and branches are found in Poznań, Nowy Sącz, and Prussia. Around the 16th century, the Sypniewski family is found living in Greater Poland owning large manorial estates there, and later we find them in West Prussia on the estate of Zmijewie (Kojalowicz, Niesiecki, Goluchowski).

Various other documents found in Polish archives refer to the family and its holdings in and around, what was later to become, the Silesian and Prussian/German/Polish border. On the division of Poland in the 18th century, the Sypniewski family is then also mentioned as Prussian nobility, and is found in Siebmacher's Wappenbuch under the Odrowąż armories.

In the 14th century, a branch of the Prussian family von Runge (originating from an area around Wroclav/Breslau) adopted the surname Sypniewski.

At the turn of the 16th, and again at the 18th to 19th century, the family split into various and distinct branches, with some members moving to the Austrian province of Galicia (holding the Austrian title Ritter von Odrowaz or Ritter von Sypniewski granted by the Empress Maria Theresia), near Ukraine and Moldavia, then on to Hungary and the Balkans. This Austrian branch produced several k.u.k. officers from the famous Theresian Military Academy in Vienna.

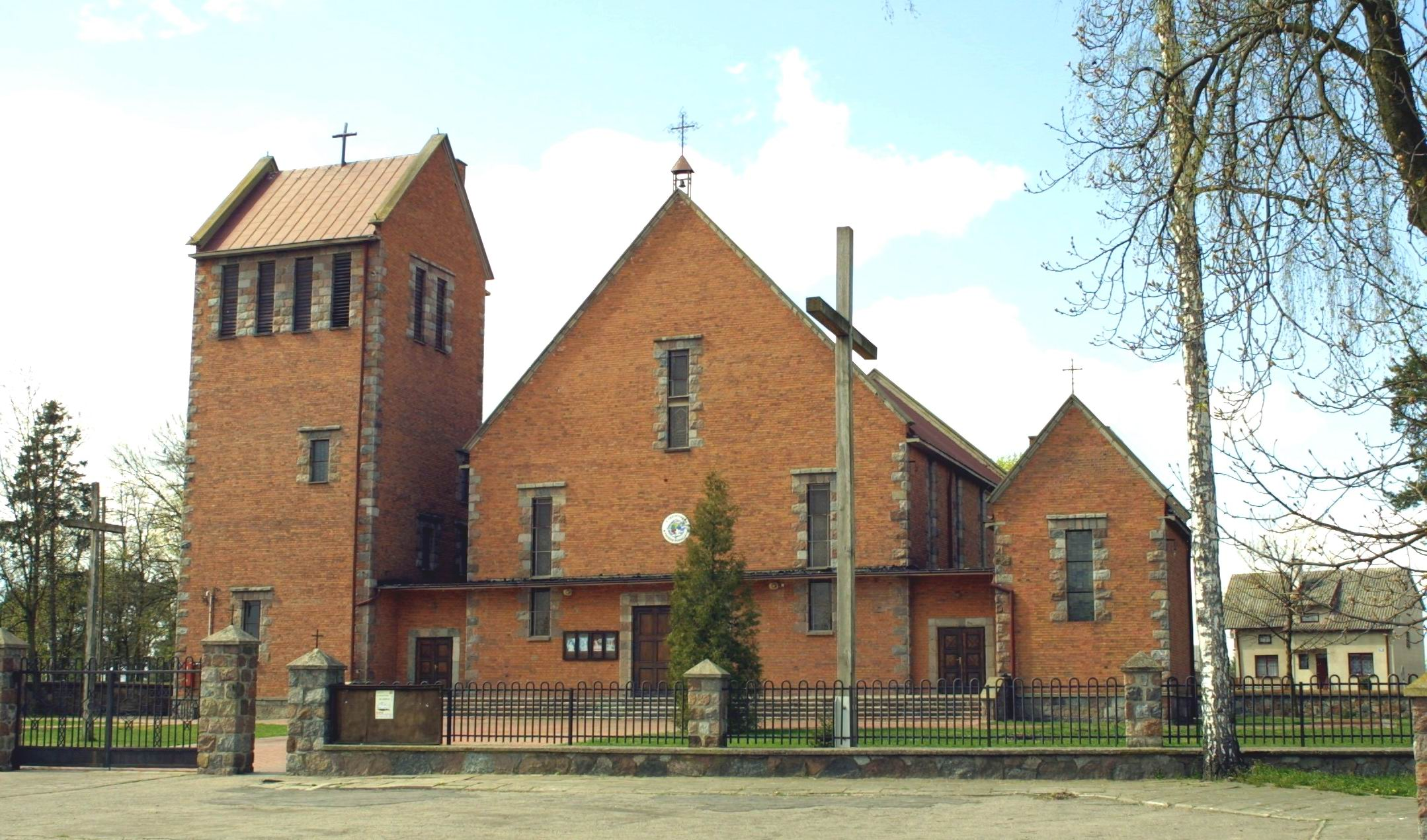
Sypniewski family church in Sypniewo

== Estates ==
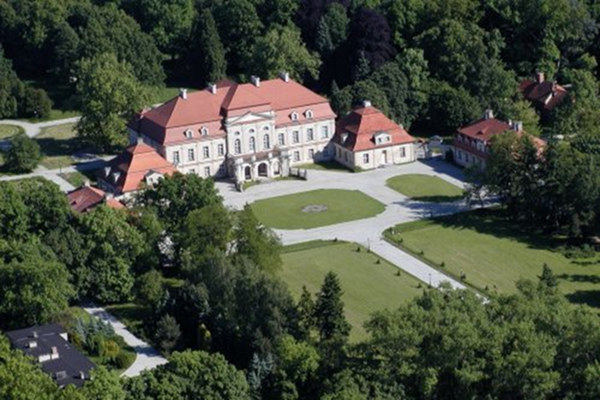
Sypniewski estate at Skoraszewice

One of the earliest recorded Sypniewski's estate transfers is from 1392, when Dobieslaw von Runge (Polish: Dobiesław Runge) married daughter of Janek from Sypniewo (Polish: Janek z Sypniewa / Janek Sypniewski, German: Johannes von Zippnow) and received Sypniewo (German: Zippnow) in dowry, as well as wedding promise of building first church there (it was completed and expanded in next decades). It is not known when exactly von Runge adopted his wife's family name, but most of their children were already known to use Sypniewski family name.
Several estates called Sypniewo (which means in Polish "the Sypniewski's Estate" or "Sypniewski's town") still exist today, such as estate south of Samotschin in the former Kreis Chodziesen/Kolmar in Posen, and larger holding called Sypniewo (Zippnow) located north of Samotschin, in Złotów county. One of their largest estates near Wyrzysk was sold to King Frederick the Great in 1774. Most of Sypniewski's estates were located in former West Prussia, now part of Wielkopolska and Pomorze, Poland. Wielkopolska, or Greater Poland, is referred to as crib, or home of the Polanie (a Slavic tribe that lived in the heart of Poland, from which name Polska – Poland – was later derived ); it also contains some of the oldest towns in today's Poland.

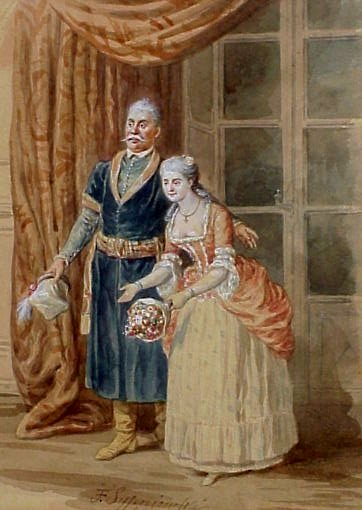
"Sypniewskis at Palace in Homel", oil on canvass painting, c. 1850

Sypniewskis also had estates in Polesie, formerly the largest province of Poland (currently part of Belarus and Ukraine), several near the city of Żytomierz (currently under Ukrainian jurisdiction since 1945) and large manorial estate crowned with beautiful palace until the end of the 18th century near the city of Gomel (currently under Belarusian jurisdiction since 1945); only portion of the cellars and some of the foundations in the ground is what remains today from this once wealthy estate, which used to provide living for about 500 peasant families.
Politician Jan Odrowaz-Sypniewski was born there around 1760. He was a legate of the Polish–Lithuanian Commonwealth's Great Parliament and one of the promoters of the first in Europe democratic Constitution of 3 May 1791 (and second in the world, after the United States Constitution). His grandson, Dyonizy Odrowaz-Sypniewski, an architect, exiled to United States and U.K., where he published – at his own expenses – many treatises and political books regarding Partitions of Poland and advocated for restitution of Poland in general. His avid anti-Russian, anti-Prussian and anti-Austrian activities didn't go well with U.K. government (all 3 countries being allies of British Empire at the time). Once he became persona non grata in Britain and was forced to leave the country, he settled in Brasil, where he built roads and bridges.
Polesie was inhabited by Ruthenians, called Polesians; of Ukrainian descent. During the 16th and 17th centuries, Sypniewski were found in Polesia as a notable family mentioned in the Listracje (inventories) similar to the registry of England's Domesday Book. The Partitions of Poland and turbulent times of 18th and 19th centuries have forced many Polish families to emigrate to other regions of Europe (particularly Prussia) and later to emigrate further across the Oceans. Among many others: Heinrich Sypniewski from Cologne had a Eucalyptus farm in Brazil; Maria Anna Sypniewski from Bydgodzcz settled in Australia in 1835; Thaddeus Sypniewski landed in Halifax, Nova Scotia, then moved to Pennsylvania in 1850; Heinrich Sypniewski, Colonel of Austrian Empire Army, have been exiled/imprisoned in Siberia after the end of 1863 Polish January Uprising and killed there in 1866 (presumably in Uprising of Polish political exiles in Siberia). Julian Sypniewski tried to establish large farm in United States in 1876 (see California links below).

Sypniewskis could also be found near Bydgoszcz (German: Bromberg) and Wrocław (German: Breslau) in the manor of Skoraszewice until World War II. Others were in Vienna, Passau, Nuremberg, Cologne, Sweden, Switzerland, and – to a lesser degree – in other European countries.

=== List of existing estates ===
- Sypniewski's estate, Sypniewo, Wiecbork County, Kuyavian-Pomeranian Voivodeship, Poland – A "Little Palace", 2010
- Sypniewski's estate; Sypniewo (now part of Poznan city), Greater Poland Voivodeship, Poznan, Poland – The "Manor under Plantan Tree", 2011
- Sypniewski's estate; Sypniewo, Jastrowie County, Greater Poland Voivodeship, Poland A "Wayside Chapel", 2011
- Sypniewski's estate; Sypniewo, Sypniewo County, Masovian Voivodeship, Poland – bird's eye view of estate, 2007
- Sypniewski's estate; Sypniewo, Margonin County, Greater Poland Voivodeship, Poland Margonin Lake and parts of estate, 2010
- Sypniewski's estate; Zhytomyr, Zhytomyr Oblast, Ukraine – Partially restored old manor, 2006
- Sypniewski's estate, Skoraszewice, Pepowo County, Greater Poland Voivodeship, Poland - almost fully restored palace, 2005

== Armorial records ==
The Sypniewski coat of arms Clan Odrowaz

The Sypniewskis use the Odrowąż clan arms.

NOTE: Polish coats of arms were never provided for individuals or for individual families, but for a much wider group of clans people (a bit like sharing a tartan colour). The Polish nobleman added the name of his clan to the family name. In addition to the adjectival surname ending "ski" or "cki" meaning 'from' or 'of'. The standard form, for example, was "Peter Sypniewski, herbu Odrowąż" or simply "Piotr Odrowąż Sypniewski". In this century the surname Sypniewski has been transmuted in Britain into Tymberlake (the old English pre-7th Century "timber" meaning wood or timber, plus "lacu", a lake or stream).

The book, Galician Nobility, (Galicia was SE Poland as part of the Austrian Empire) lists the arms for Sypniewski (table 449): a family of Polish gentry from the Polish Province (Wojewodztwo) of Prussia, where they are first recorded in 1490. Descendant Boniface Sypniewski is entered in the records of Galicia in 1783. The coat of arms is Odrowąż.

Siebmacher's Wappenbuch (Siebmacher's armorial reference book) under Preussischer Adel (Prussian Nobility), records Sypniewski (table 269), a Polish family, connected to the Odrowaz coat of arms, still 20 years ago (at the printing of the above stated book, c. 1840) in possession of a sizable piece of farmland. Coat of arms: Look under Gliscinski III (Odrowaz).

=== Odrowąż Coat of Arms ===
Description for the Sypniewski name .

Arms: Gules, an arrow argent point to chief, the base terminating as inverted horns.
(Red, a silver arrow, point upwards, the base terminating as inverted horns)
Crest: out of a crest coronet proper, a pananache of peacock plumes proper, charged with arms, fesseway (horizontally). Motto: No motto is recorded

Heraldic Colors: Argent: silver and is usually depicted in heraldic painting as white – or: gold and is usually depicted in heraldic painting as yellow. Gules: red in heraldic language. Red is a royal color. Red/argent stands for bold and resolutely honest with martial prowess, boldness, and valor

Heraldic Symbolism: Arrows: arrows usually are traced to achievements of the original bearer during the Crusades. Arrows are symbolic of one who is ready and fit for military encounter.

Peacock Feathers: the peacock represents personal pride. Feathers also symbolise conquests in Syria/Holy Land over the Saracens in the Crusades.

Ducal Coronet: The four leaves on the coronet surmounting the helmet were originally oak leaves, then changed to the Polish traditional strawberry leaves. Leaves symbolise victorious battle, and/or a title of nobility.

== Comments ==
The Odrowąż arms are also prominently shown in the film Knights of the Teutonic Order (Polish: Krzyżacy), one of the largest film productions ever in Poland, based on the 1900 novel of the same name by Nobel Prize laureate, Henryk Sienkiewicz. King Władysław Jagiełło – a historic person, king of Poland between 1381 and 1434 – was the first Polish king to recognize Sypniewski's Pomeranian nobility and to bestow them the Odrowąż coat of arms. It was very important event in Sypniewskis history and turning point in their genealogy, as from that moment on vast majority of Sypniewski's clan members were no longer identified as Pomeranian family, but chose to side with, and de facto became Poles. Sypniewski clan provided king Jagiełło (and later his son, king Casimir IV Jagiellon) with knights, arms, soldiers, supplies and money in their fight against Teutonic Order and they took active part in taking of Bydgoszcz, famous Battle of Grunwald, long Thirteen Years' War, and in every war fought by Poland since (i.e. Rotmistrz (Captain of Cavalry, equivalent of modern Colonel) Jan Stefan Sypniewski had briefly occupied Moscow in 1605 during Polish–Muscovite War)

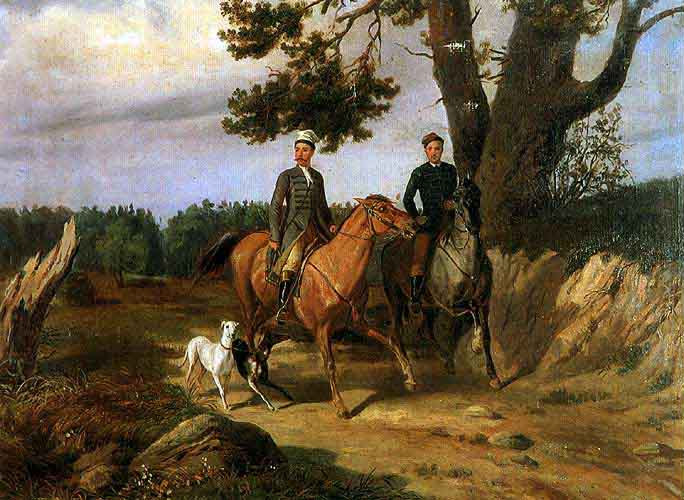
"Hunt with Greyhounds" by Feliks Sypniewski, 1870

Feliks Sypniewski was a famous Polish Painter who later emigrated to Paris and is buried at the Père Lachaise Cemetery.

Felicjan Sypniewski was a scientist whose ground-breaking studies and scientific publications influenced the next generations of Polish naturalists and have laid down foundations of malacology and algology.

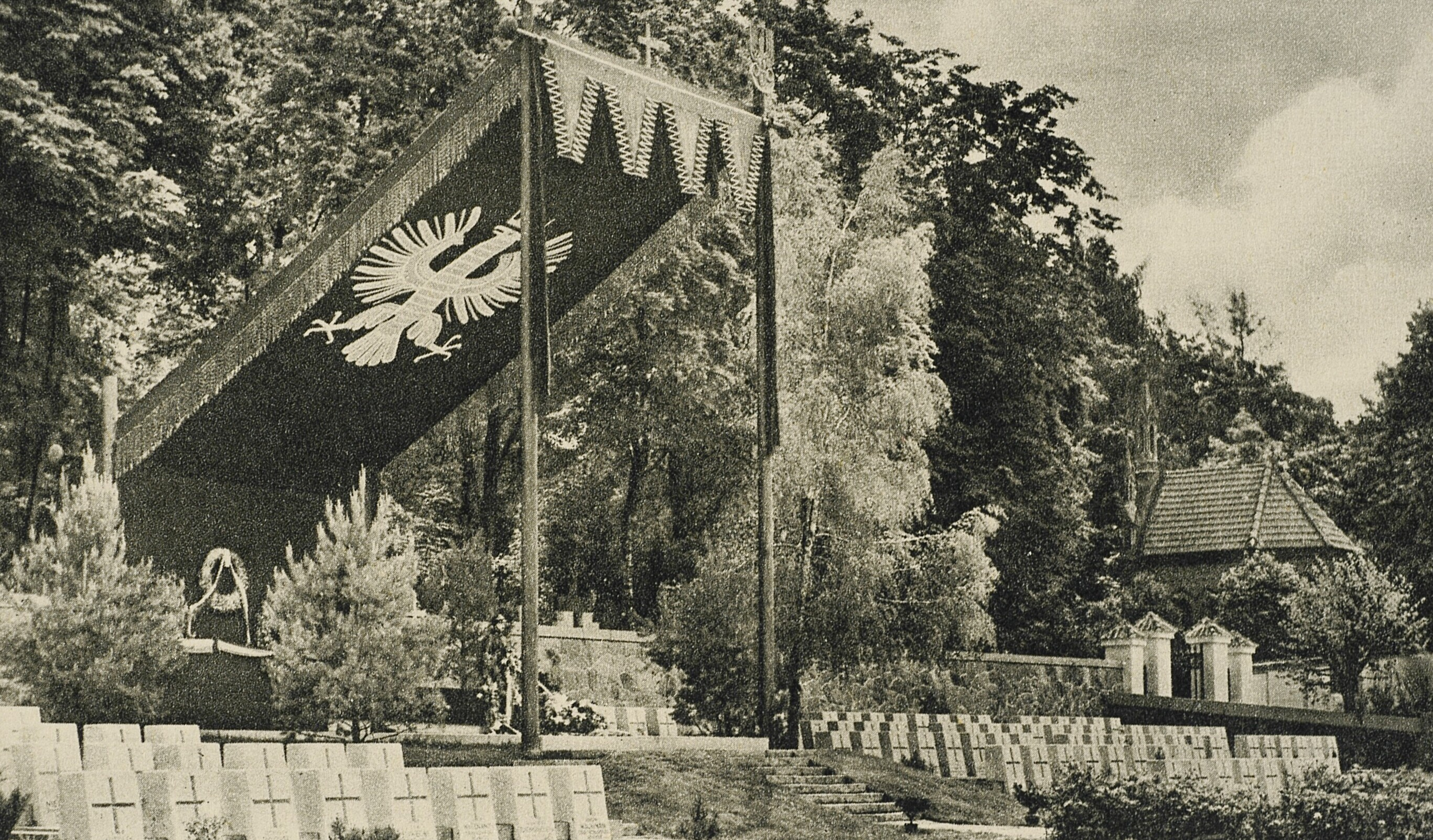
Józef Piłsudski mausoleum in Vilnius, work of sculptor Bolesław Sypniewski, 1937

Renowned sculptor Bolesław Sypniewski donated almost 2 years of his work for the mausoleum of the most famous leader of Second Polish Republic, Marshal Józef Piłsudski. His Matka i Serce Syna (Mother and Her Son's Heart) black granite tombstone is still laying there today in Vilnius's Rossa Cemetery in Lithuania (back then part of Poland), where – in accordance with his wishes – the heart of Marshal Piłsudski was buried in his mother's tomb.

Sypniewskis have, over the millennium, produced gallant knights, politicians, artists, authors, engineers, officers, musicians, medical doctors, teachers, government administrators, few explorers, and even sportsmen in recent times.

Members of the Sypniewski family have been actively involved in Polish politics for seven centuries and took part in all Polish wars and uprisings, including Polish Underground Resistance and French Resistance during World War II (i.e. Jan Sypniewski, later known as Jan Slave, journalist at the Neue Zürcher Zeitung).

Even though by today many of the families bearing the surname Sypniewski may no longer be classified as being truly 'related', often physical traits are still intact. On the male side they usually are tall, with a high forehead and 'Geheimratsecken' (naturally receded hairline above the temple) with an oval face. Also certain forenames were given within the families and only with the advent of the World Wars was this changed. For example: Jan, Stanislas and Adalbert (or Albert) were very common. It is worthwhile to note that the large parish church in Margonin (near Sypniewo/Chrustowo) is named after Saint Patron of Sypniewski family – St Adalbert, and it was erected by Sypniewskis at the end of 14th Century.

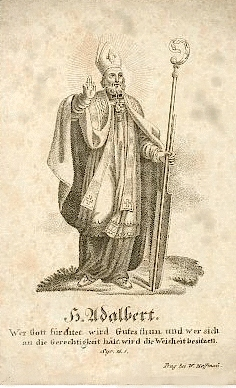
Patron Saint of Sypniewskis

== California links ==
As recounted in her memoirs, the actress Helena Modrzejewska (usually known as Helena Modjeska) emigrated to the United States in 1876. The group of emigrants who settled in Anaheim, California, also included Henryk Sienkiewicz and his good friend Julian Sypniewski, whose Sypniewski family stories and old tell-tales could have been – or most likely were – important inspirations for stories later written by Sienkiewicz in his novels. Julian's friend, Stanisław Witkiewicz (father of famous Polish poet, writer and painter, Stanisław Ignacy Witkiewicz) and Adam Chmielowski had planned to be part of this group, but they changed their minds at the last minute.

== Notable people ==
- Igor Sypniewski, Polish footballer
- Marian Sypniewski, Polish fencer, Olympic medalist
- Quinn Sypniewski, American football player
- Clarissa Sypniewski, German Actress
- David Sypniewski, USA - world renown snowboarder
- Witold Sypniewski, Polish anti-communist opposition, awarded with Cross of Freedom and Solidarity

== Sources ==
- Niesiecki, Kasper Herbarz Polski by Kasper Niesiecki, S. J., Leipzig edition, 1839–1846.
- Ritter von Sypniewski Odrowaz, Alfred; 50 Jahre Kaiser ("50 Years Emperor") Vienna, Austria, 1913
- F.W.F. von Schmitt; Der Kreis Flatow ("Złotów County"), Berlin, 1709
- Siebmacher's Wappenbuch ("Book of Nobility's Coat of Arms") München, Germany, 1605
- Złota Księga Szlachty Polskiej ("Golden Book of Polish Nobility")
- Sypniewski Family archives and official records
- Records of the Theresianum archives, Vienna, Austria
- Sypniewo County archives, Poland
- Roman Catholic Church records, Poland & Germany
- Evangelical Church records, Poland & Germany
- Deak, Istvan Beyond Nationalism – A social and political history of the Habsburg Officer Corps 1848–1918 see page 159
- https://naprzekordniom.wordpress.com/2022/09/10/skoraszewice/
- https://odznaczeni-kwis.ipn.gov.pl/persons/view/a67d4808-dd72-45c0-b7e2-d0e60ad67396
