= Piwarski =

Piwarski is a Polish surname. Notable people with the surname include:

- Adolf Piwarski (1817–1870), Polish painter
- Jan Feliks Piwarski (1794–1859), Polish painter and writer
- Kazimierz Piwarski (1903–1968), Polish historian
