= Wincenty Pol =

Polish poet and geographer

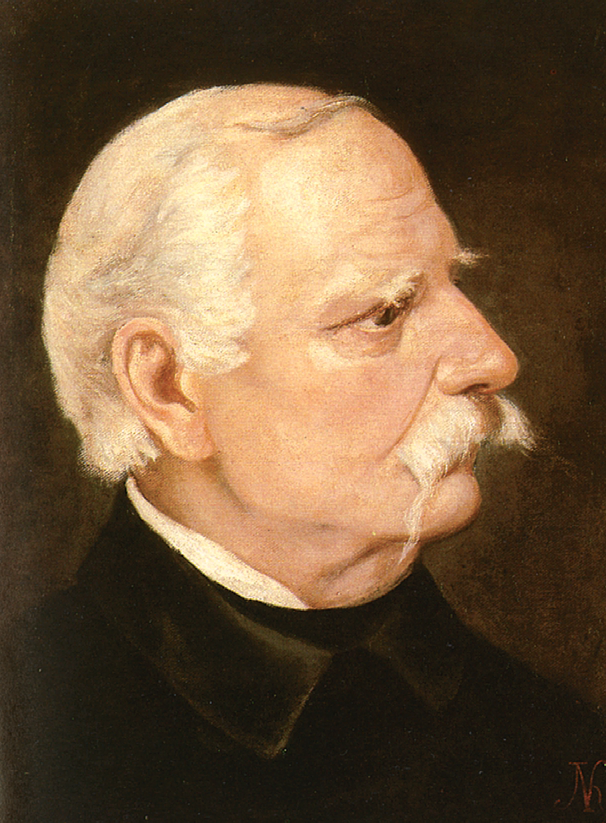
- Portrait of Wincenty Pol by Juliusz Kossak
- Born: 20 April 1807; Lublin, Kingdom of Galicia
- Died: 2 December 1872 (aged 65); Kraków
- Education: Lviv University
- Occupations: poet, geographer

Signature
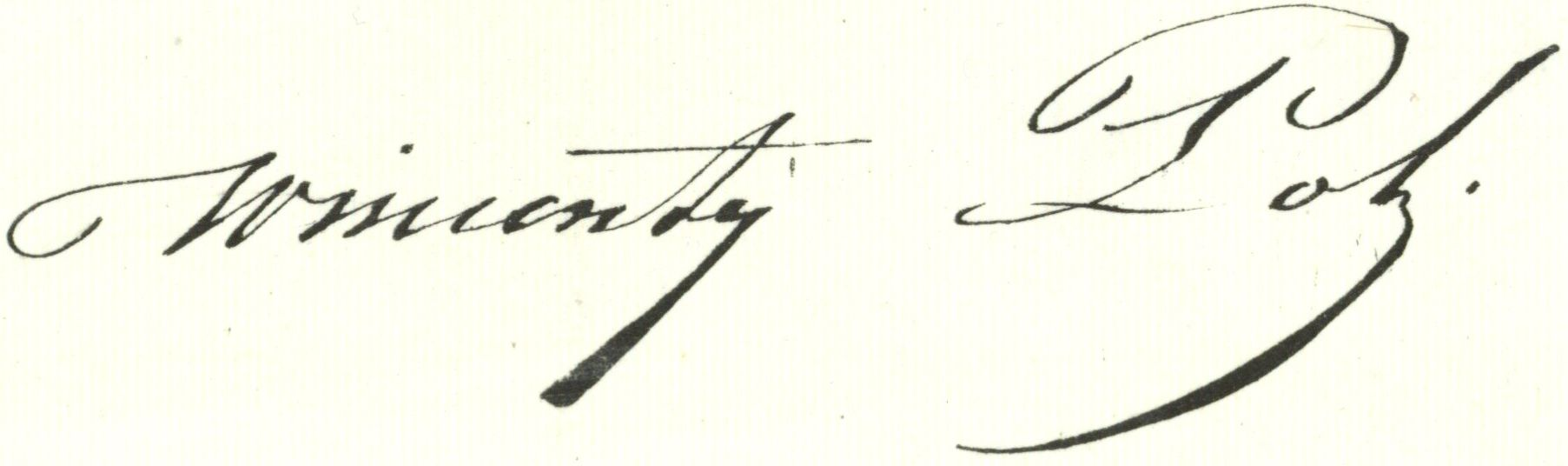

Wincenty Pol (German: Vinzenz Xaver Ferrarius Poll; 20 April 1807 – 2 December 1872) was a Polish poet and geographer.

== Life ==
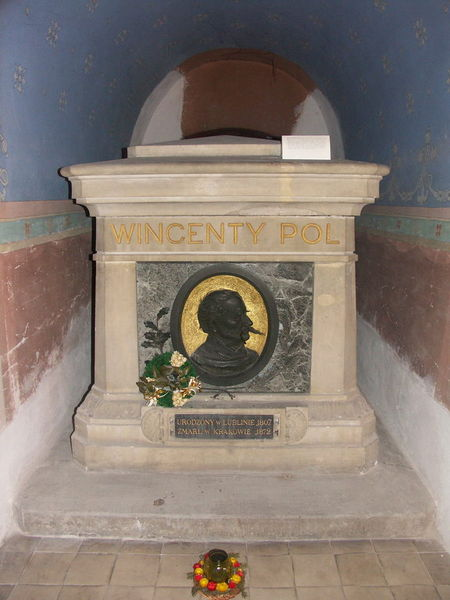
Pol's tomb, Skałka Church

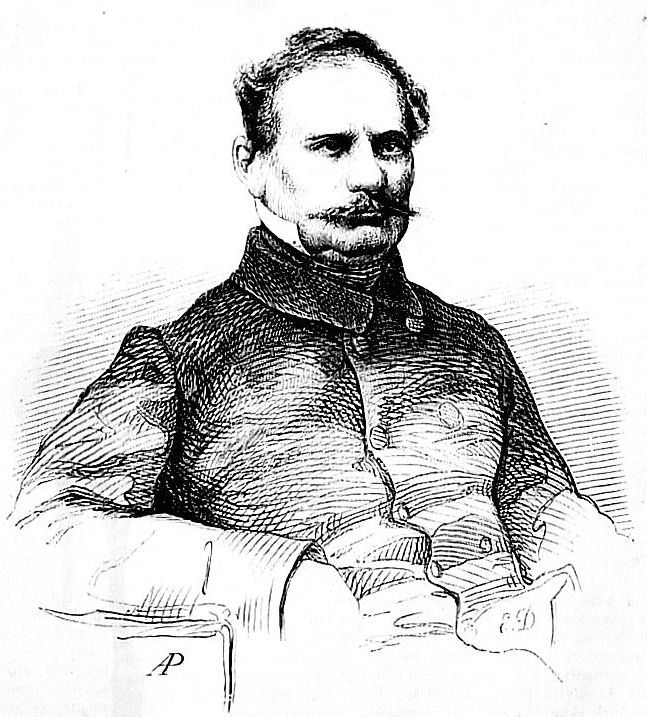
Etching from a photograph, by Adolf Piwarski (1862)

Pol was born in Lublin (then in Galicia), to Franz Pohl (or Poll), a German in the Austrian service, and his wife Eleonora Longchamps de Berier, from a French family living in Poland. Pol fought in the Polish army in the November 1830 Uprising and participated in the 1848 revolution. In spite of his mixed family background, he considered himself a Pole, so much so that he changed his surname to Pol.

He was interned in Königsberg after the fall of the November Uprising in Russian partition of Poland. He enrolled at the University but soon became embroiled in controversy, for his anti-Tsarist agitation. While Pol was defended by German speaking professors, Peter von Bohlen and Friedrich Wilhelm Schubert, he left Prussia and continued his exile in France. While in exile Pol worked on his first poems in tribute to the heroism of the insurgents, issued later in the set of "Songs of Janusz".

Although he had no formal education in geography, during his travels in Polish lands he wrote several books on this subject, and in 1849 was appointed professor at the Jagiellonian University in Kraków.

He wrote a fine descriptive work, Obrazy z życia i podróży (Pictures of Life and Travel), and also a poem Pieśń o ziemi naszej (Song of our Land). In 1855 he published Mohort, a poem relating to the times of Stanisław August Poniatowski. His earlier Songs of Janusz (1836) inspired Frédéric Chopin to write a number of Polish songs, but only one survives.

Pol was probably first to introduce into Polish literature the term "Kresy" to describe the territories lying near the eastern frontiers of the Polish–Lithuanian Commonwealth.

He died in Kraków. Pol was interred in Kraków's historic Skałka Church, a mini-pantheon of Polish scholars, writers and artists, especially from the Kraków area.
