= Kazimierz Wojniakowski =

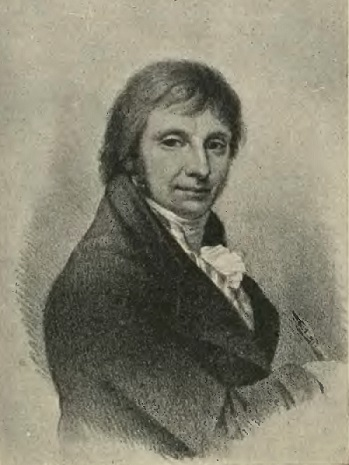
Kazimierz Wojniakowski, portrait by Jan Feliks Piwarski

Kazimierz Wojniakowski (1771/72 – 1812) was a Polish painter, illustrator, and Freemason, known primarily for his portraits in the sentimentalist style.

== Life and work ==
Wojniakowski was born in Kraków. He was a pupil of Marcello Bacciarelli.

His work as a portraitist was influenced by that of the Austrian painter Josef Grassi (who was living in Warsaw at that time), as exemplified in his 1796 Portrait of Izabela Czartoryska, née Fleming. He died in Warsaw.

Other noteworthy portraits by Wojniakowski include Tadeusz Kościuszko, Stanisław August Poniatowski, and Stanisław Sołtyk.

He also produced religious works and scenes of contemporary historic events (e.g., The Constitution of May 3, 1791, 1806).

Notable as well are his drawings from journeys, e.g. in Lublin Province.

== Selected works ==
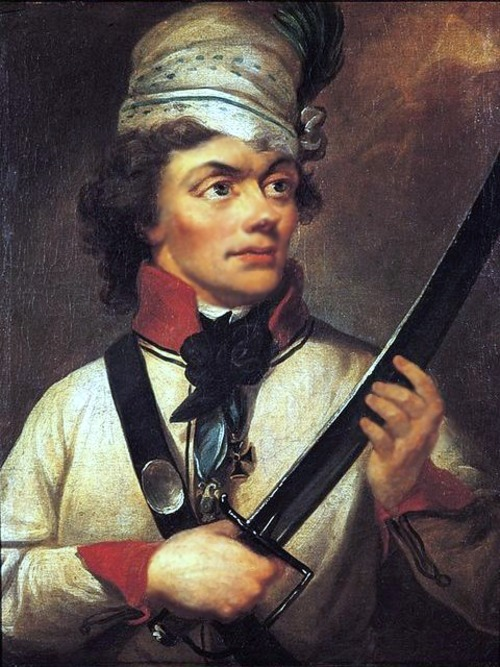
Tadeusz Kościuszko

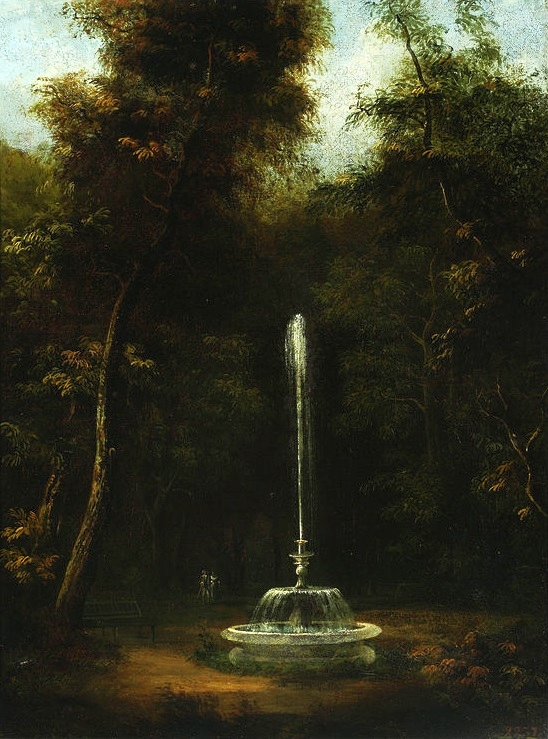
Royal Baths Park (fountain)

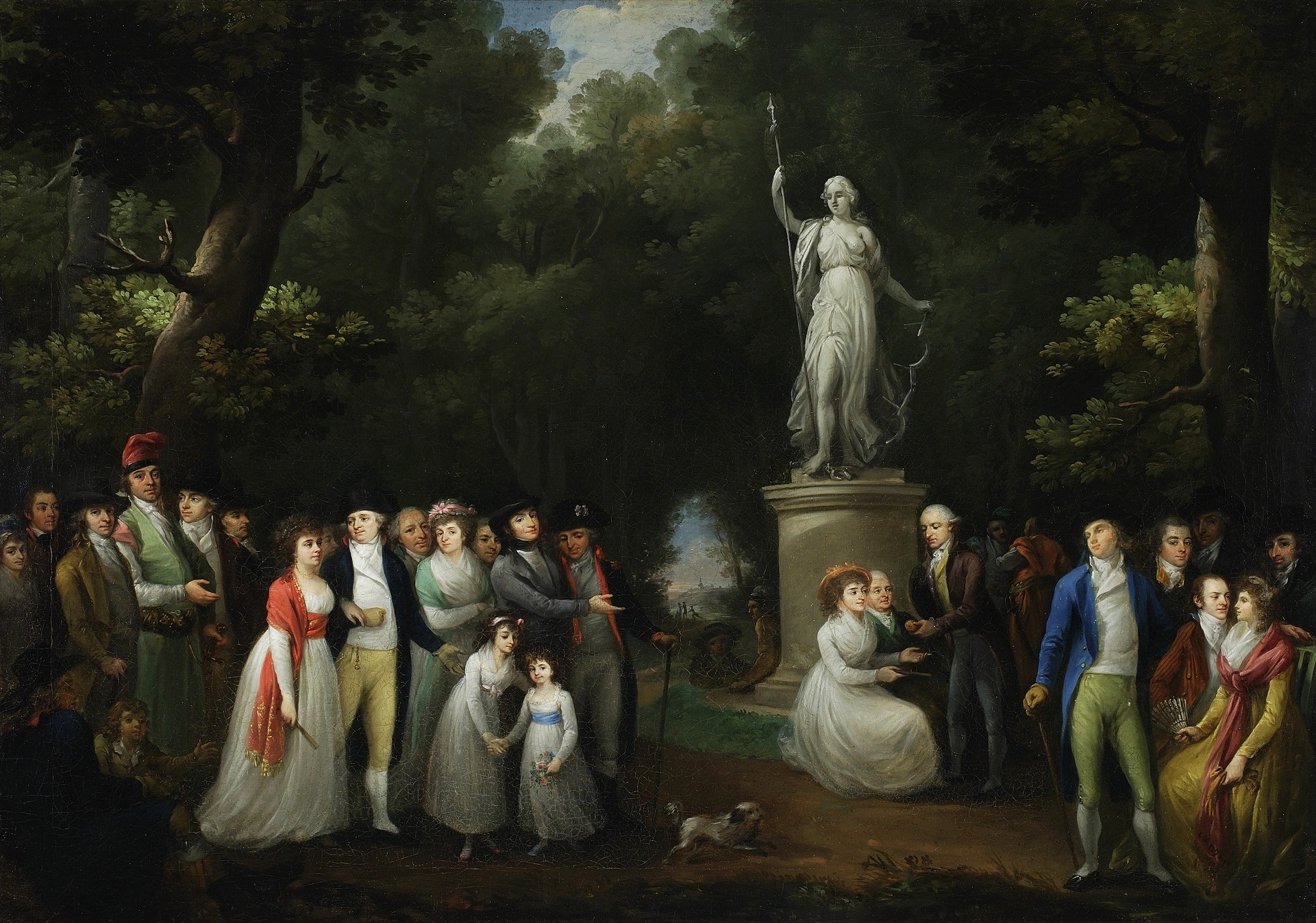
Social Gathering in Royal Baths (Łazienki) Park

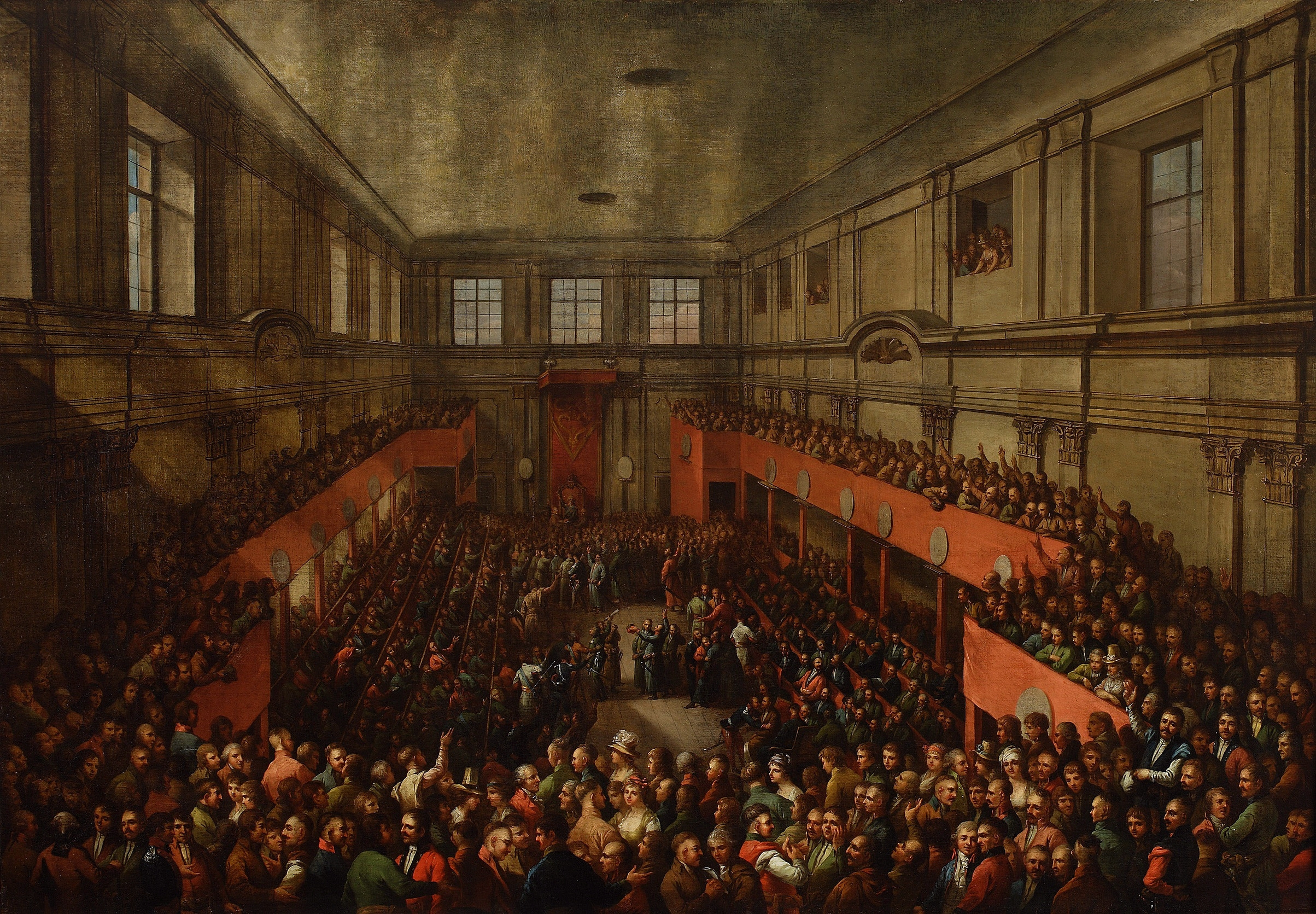
Adoption of the Constitution of May 3, 1791 (1806)

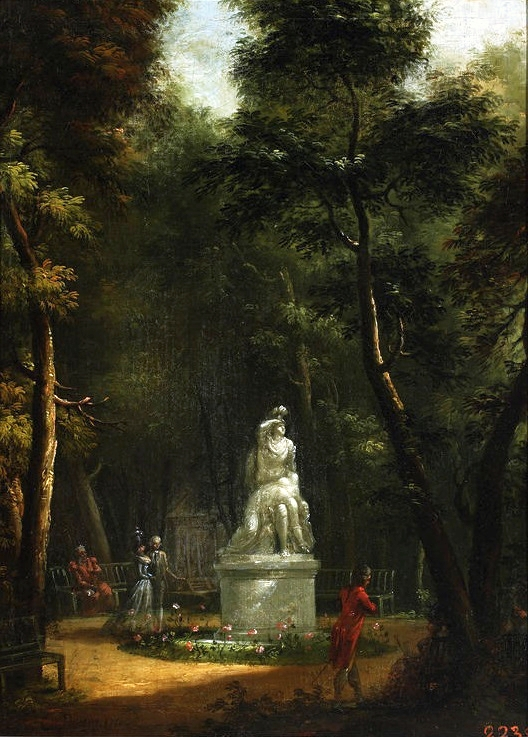
Royal Baths Park (statue)

== See also ==
- List of Polish artists
