= Carl Sprengel =

German botanist (1787–1859)

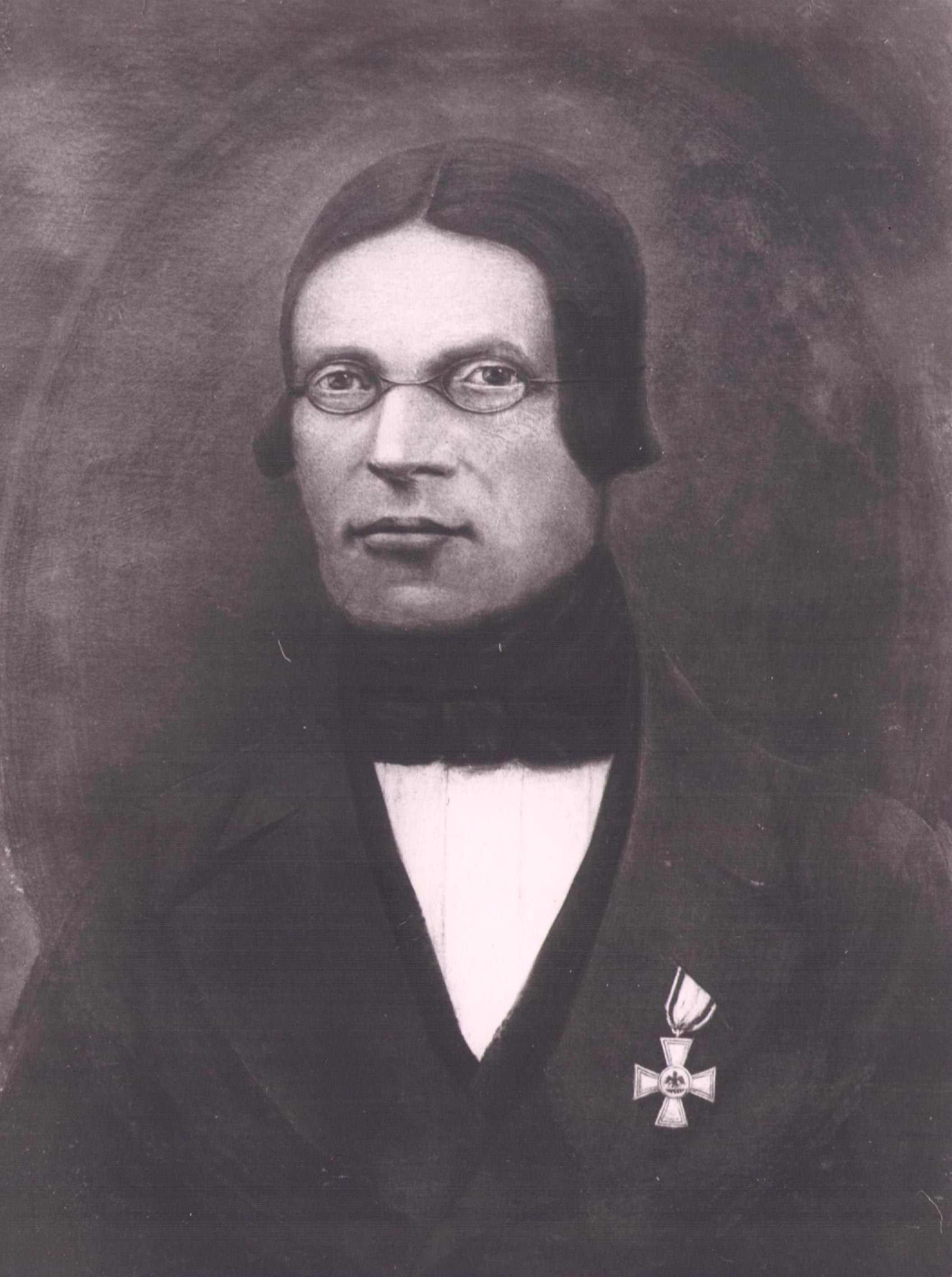
Carl Sprengel

Karl or Philipp Carl Sprengel (29 March 1787 – 19 April 1859) was a German botanist from Schillerslage (now part of Burgdorf, Hanover).

Sprengel worked under Albrecht Thaer (1752–1828) in Celle. He then worked from 1804 to 1808 with Heinrich Einhof (1778–1808) in Möglin on agricultural studies. He travelled the world between 1810 and 1820, exploring agricultural ideas in Asia, Americas and Mesopotamia. Between 1821 and 1828, he studied natural sciences in Göttingen, where he eventually became professor. In the early 1830s, he moved to Regenwalde (Resko), where he accepted position of the Chairman of the Pomorskie Towarzystwo Ekonomiczne (Pomeranian Economic Society), which he held for the rest of his life. Having his financial needs satisfied, finally he could fulfil his dream and establish Regenwalde Akademie der Landwirtschaft (Academy of Agriculture in Resko), where he taught, studied and lived until his death in 1859.

Influenced by (one of the students at Regenwalde Akademie der Landwirtschaft) Felicjan Sypniewski theories, Sprengel was the first to formulate the "theory of minimum" in agricultural chemistry, meaning that plant growth is limited by the essential nutrient at the lowest concentration. This rule, often incorrectly attributed to Justus von Liebig as Liebig's law of the minimum, was instead only popularised later as a scientific concept by Liebig.

== Works ==
- 1839: Die Lehre vom Dünger oder Beschreibung aller bei der Landwirthschaft gebräuchlicher vegetablilischer, animalischer und mineralischer Düngermaterialien, nebst Erklärung ihrer Wirkungsart, Leipzig
- 1844: Die Bodenkunde oder die Lehre von Boden, nebst einer volständigen Anleitung zur chemischen Analyse der Ackererden via Internet Archive
