= Felicjan Sypniewski =

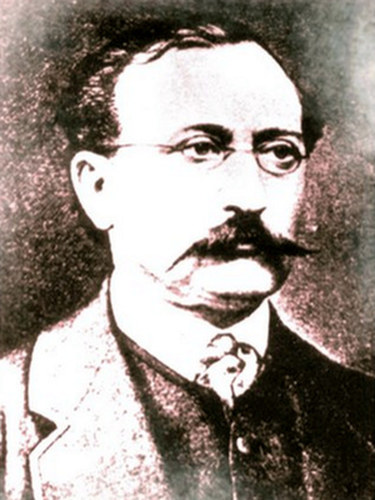
- Born: 24 January 1822; Piotrowo (Sypniewski family estate), Grand Duchy of Posen
- Died: 6 September 1877 (aged 55); Piotrowo estate, German Empire
- Known for: diatoms study
- Scientific career
- Fields: Natural history

Felicjan Odrowąż Sypniewski (24 January 1822 – 6 September 1877), also known as Felicyan Sypniewski, was a Polish naturalist, botanist, entomologist, malacologist, algologist and philosopher.

His ground-breaking studies and scientific publications influenced the next generations of Polish naturalists and have laid down foundations of malacology.

== Personal life ==
Born on one of the largest Sypniewski's estates in Greater Poland into a Polish noble family, he was the first son of Stanislaus Sypniewski (crest Odrowąż) and Anna Powelska (clan Nałęcz). Due to events following Partitions of Poland this part of Poland was occupied by Germany during his entire lifetime, thus his official citizenship was German.

He married his childhood friend, Walerya Dobrogojski of the clan Grabie. Walerya died shortly after giving birth to their son, Józef Sypniewski, in 1850. After her death for many years he lived alone, spending all of his time on studying, until suddenly he surprised everyone and married again to young Walentyna (Valentina) Radoński of the clan Jasieńczyk, beautiful daughter of impoverished nobility Józef Radoński and Ludwika Kierski (of the clan Jastrzębiec).
One of his great-grandchildren is Derek Sypniewski, contemporary American film director and actor.

Although Felicjan avoided politics his entire life, he was a Polish patriot and avid supporter of restoration of sovereign Polish Republic. He sold a significant portion of the family estate during January Uprising and donated twice large sums of money to the cause.

== Education ==
As with most of the nobility at that time, he was home-schooled first by private teachers from Switzerland, UK and France, then he attended one of the best secondary schools in Poland at the time, Saint Mary Magdalene High School in Poznań.

In 1840 he took a couple years of field practice on his family estate in Truskałowo before continuing education under watchful eye of Carl Sprengel at the Regenwalde Akademie der Landwirtschaft (Academy of Agriculture in Resko), where – partially thanks to Felicjan's notes and observations – Sprengel formulated his "Theorem of minimum" (commonly known as "Liebig's law", because it was Justus von Liebig who later popularized this theorem and was mistakenly attributed its authorship).

Finally Sypniewski attended and graduated at Berlin University.

== Studies ==
After finishing his education, he settled and worked in Skoraszewice, Piotrowo, Pempowo and Sypniewo (all within his family's vast estate at that time), where he worked on natural history in general, and published multiple studies and expertises in entomology, malacology and algology, as well as occasional medical and philosophical treatises, among many others. In his later years, he focused on studying algaes and seaweed.

For his scientific work on diatoms he was offered the position of Dean of Zoology at the Jagiellonian University, the most renowned and oldest of Polish universities. He was one of the founders and unanimously elected the President of the Faculty of Natural Sciences of the Poznańskie Towarzystwo Przyjaciół Nauk (PTPN), renowned Polish Society of Science (and the only Polish such society allowed to exist in occupied Poland at that time - hence its name "Poznańskie" - which means "of Poznan city" - instead of "Polish", since the term "Polish" was forbidden under the German occupation laws).

== Legacy ==
He collected and properly preserved (using his own-devised process) more than 10,000 specimens of butterflies and spiders alone, some of which are the only existing examples of species considered extinct today. This enormous collection had been split and stolen few times: particularly during World War I by Germans in 1918, and thrice during World War II: again by Germans in 1940 and in 1944, and the remaining part of the collection had been taken by the Soviet Red Army in the summer of 1945. Specimens from his collection can be found today at many European universities and museums, mostly in Russia and Germany, and in private collections as well.

In recognition of his contribution to science there are schools named after him or having Felicjan Sypniewski as their patron
