= Jan Feliks Piwarski =

Polish artist (1794–1859)

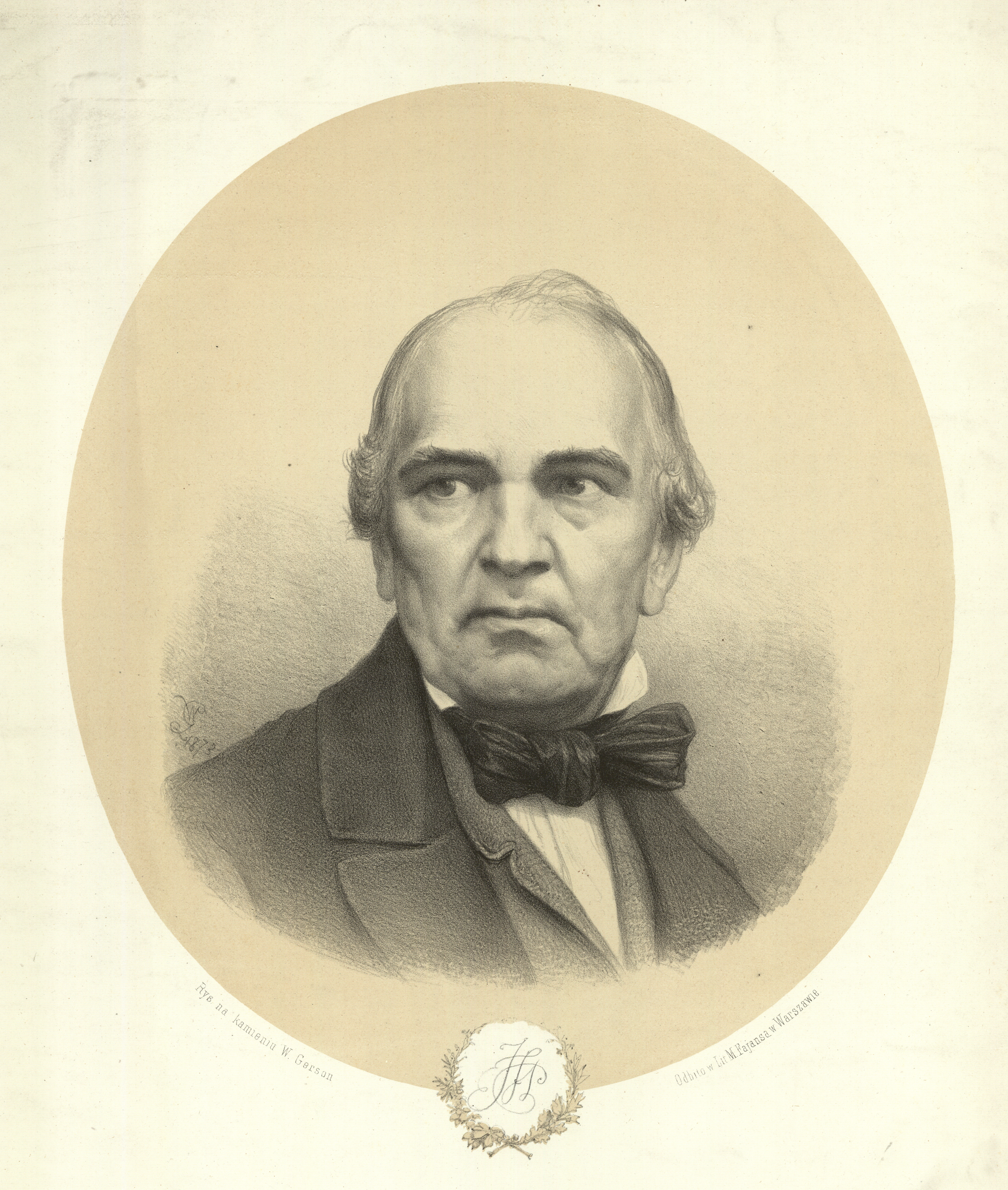
An image of Piwarski published in 1873

Jan Feliks Piwarski (Polish pronunciation: [jan fɛliks pʲivarskʲi]; 20 November 1794 – 17 December 1859) was a Polish painter, curator, writer and graphic artist; one of the earliest lithographers in Poland.

== Biography ==
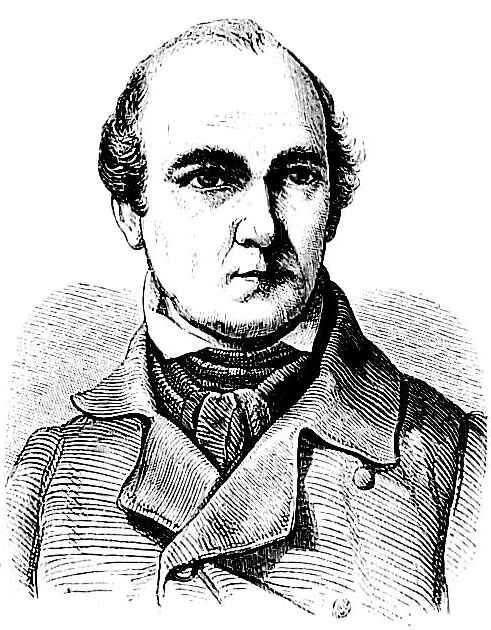
Jan Feliks Piwarski, from Tygodnik Illustrowany (1859, artist uncredited, possibly his son, Adolf)

He was born in Puławy. He came from a family of craftsmen and studied painting with Józef Richter (1780–1837). In 1816, he moved to Warsaw, where he took employment as a clerk for the Komisji Sprawiedliwości ('Justice Committee'). Two years later, he was appointed as curator of the print collection at the University of Warsaw and, shortly thereafter, became Secretary of the University Library. He would hold both of these positions until the University was closed by the Russian authorities in 1832.

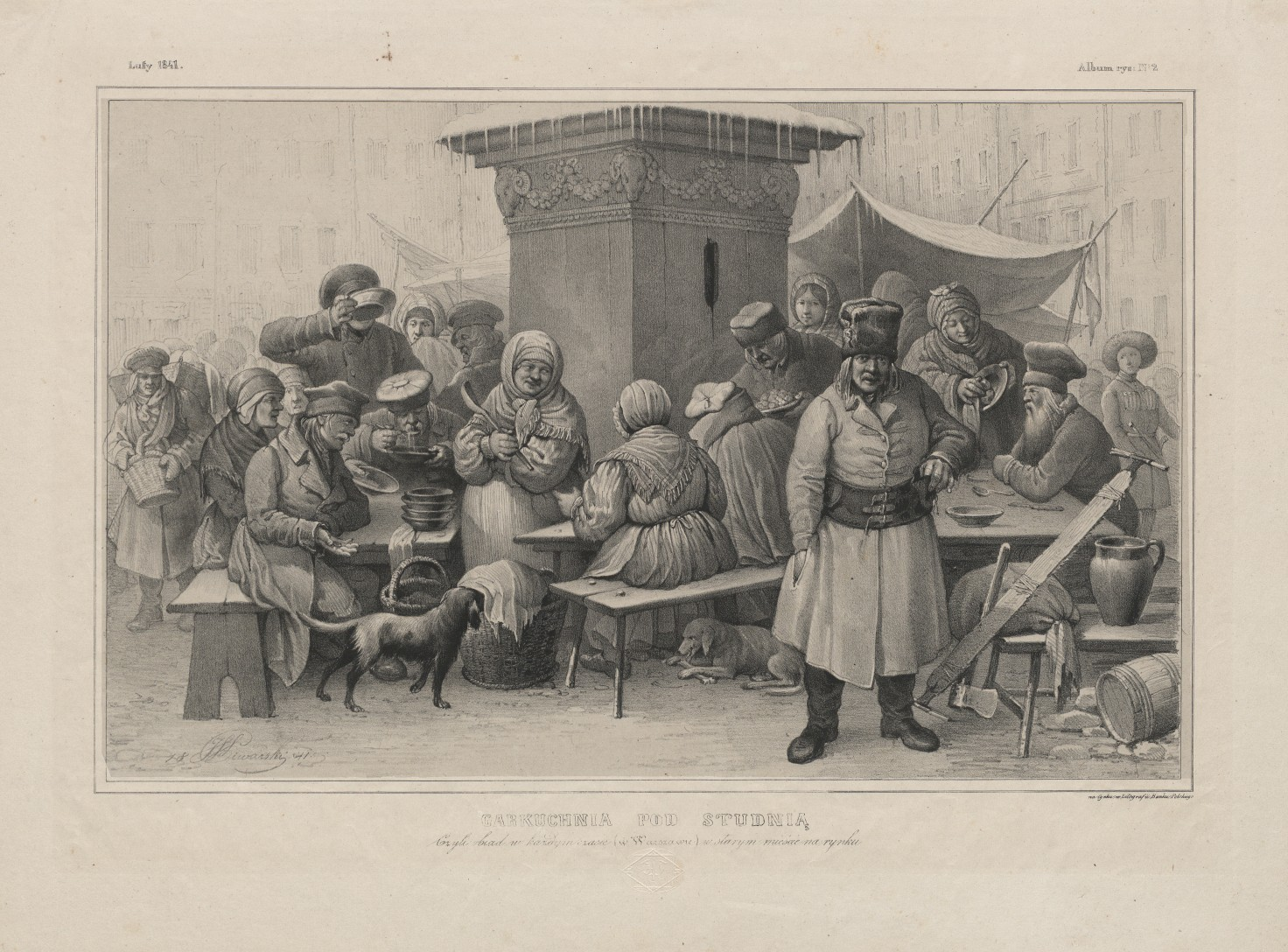
Soup-Kitchen Near the Well, from the Album cynkograficzno-rysunkowe warszawskie

In 1819, he travelled to Vienna as an advisor for the Komisji Wyznań Religijnych i Oświecenia Publicznego ('Committee of Religious Affairs and Public Enlightenment'). While there, he studied graphic techniques at the Imperial print collection with Adam von Bartsch. After returning, he worked to enlarge and organize the University's collection and wrote several articles on art and history for the Gazetą Literacką. From 1820 to 1830, he worked with the Towarzystwa Przyjaciół Nauk ('Society of the Friends of Science') as artistic director for their Monumenta Regnum Poloniae Cracoviensis ('Tombs of the Kingdom of Poland in Kraków').

Together with Seweryn Oleszczyński, he worked to promote a new lithographic technology; the zincograph. In 1825, he took a trip to Berlin and Dresden to study new methods of museum curating. Following the failure of the November Uprising and the closing of the University, he oversaw the liquidation of the University's art and book collections; organizing the materials and preparing them for shipment to Saint Petersburg.

During the next decade, he wrote several works on art and art education, including Wzory i nauka rysunków ('Models and Scientific Drawing'), published in 1840 and reprinted several times. He also taught at an academy for young ladies and a private art school operated by Aleksander Kokular.

Later, he took an active role in helping to establish the Szkoła Sztuk Pięknych ('School of Fine Arts in Warsaw'). When it opened in 1844, he was given the chair of drawing and landscape painting, which he held until his retirement in 1848. He is credited with introducing the practice of painting en plein air.

His oil paintings were largely composed of landscapes and genre scenes, with a few works depicting events of the November Uprising. Among his best-known students were Wojciech Gerson, Franciszek Kostrzewski, Henryk Pillati, Józef Simmler and Józef Szermentowski. His son, Adolf, was a well-known miniaturist.

Piwarski died in 1859, in Warsaw.

== Selected works ==
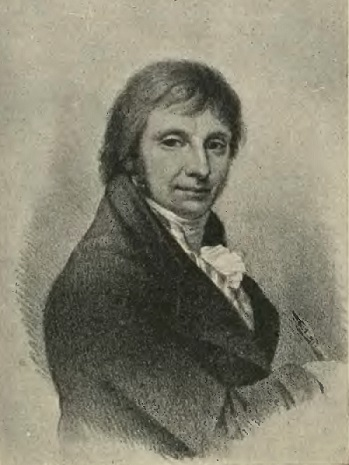
Kazimierz Wojniakowski

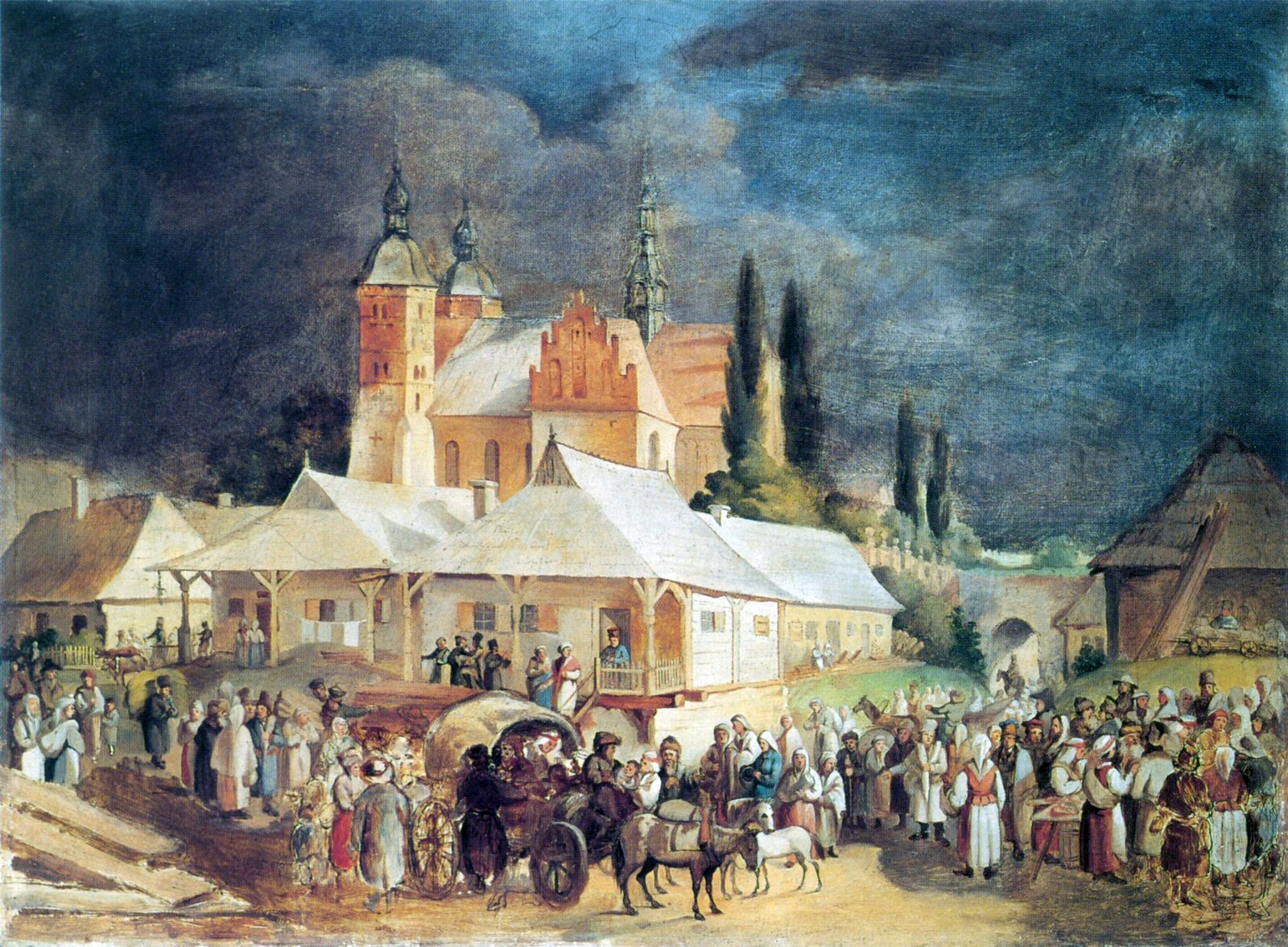
Market in Opatów

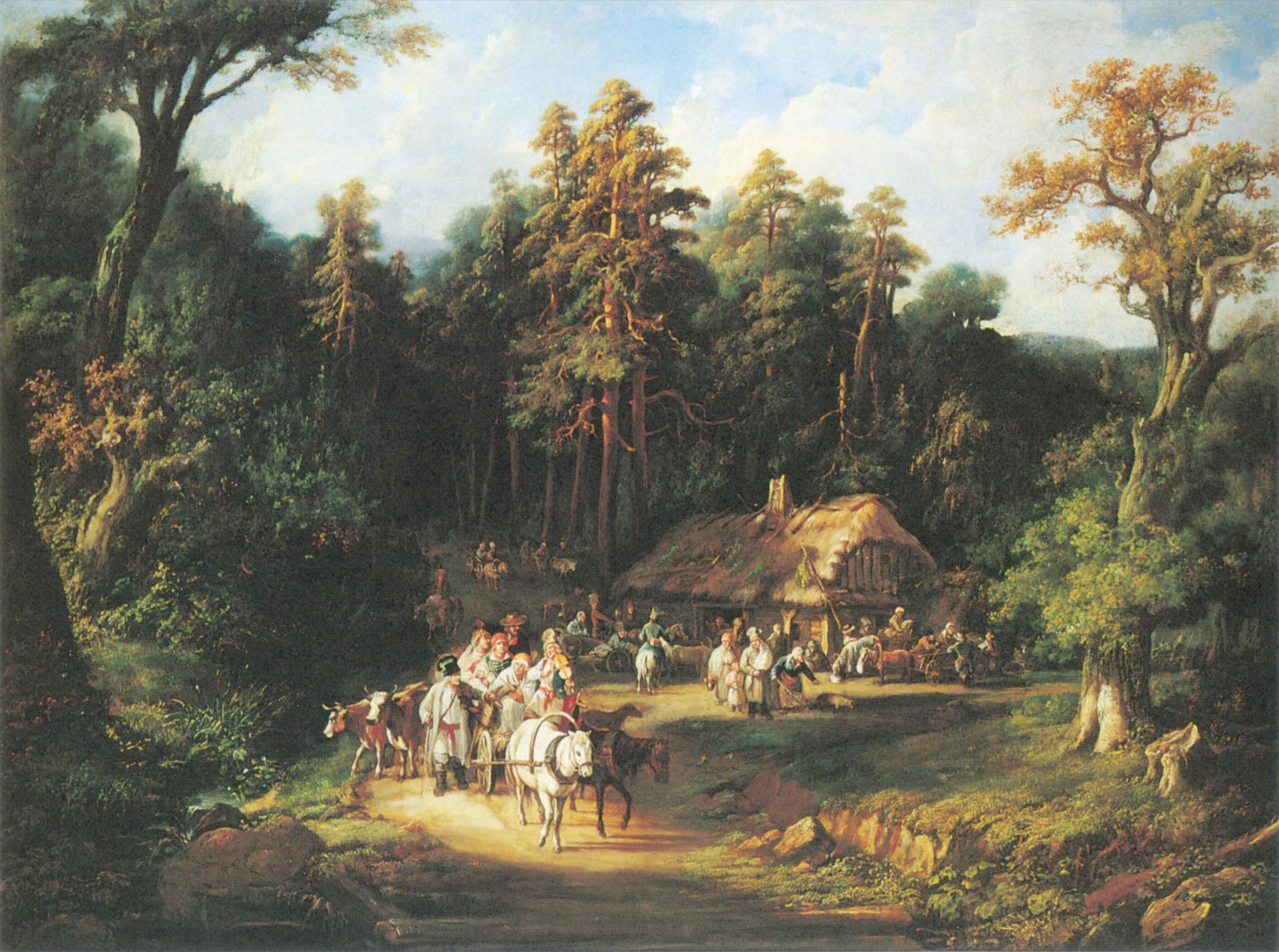
The "Last Penny" Inn

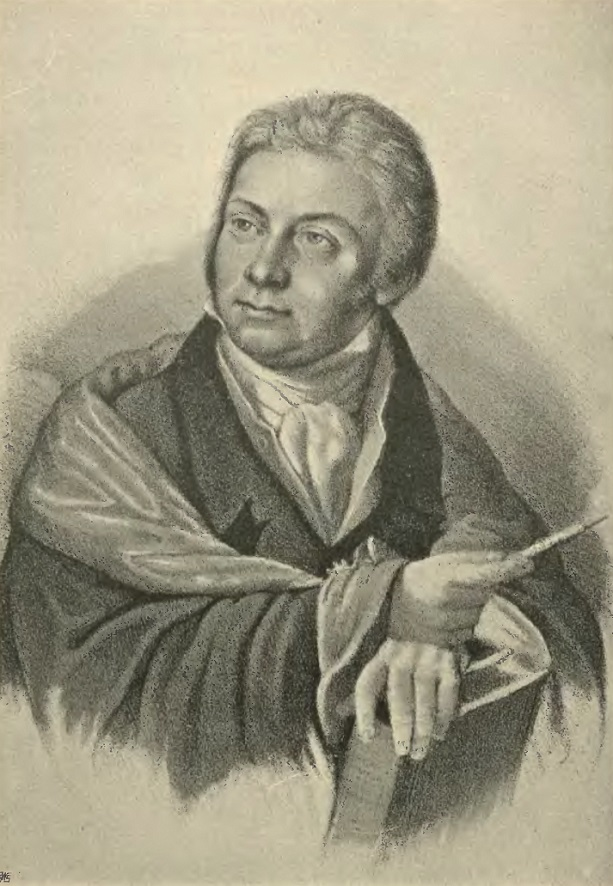
Zygmunt Vogel
