= Józef Szermentowski =

Polish landscape painter

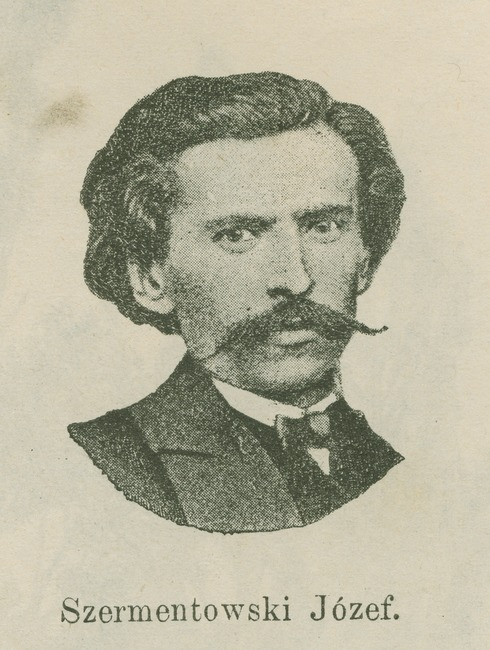
- Portrait by an unknown artist
- Born: 16 February 1833; Bodzentyn
- Died: 6 September 1876 (aged 43); Paris

Józef Szermentowski, or Szermętowski (16 February 1833 – 6 September 1876), was a Polish landscape painter, influenced by the Barbizon School.

== Biography ==
At first, for reasons that are unclear, he lived with his aunt, the abbess of the local monastery. It was there he first displayed a talent for drawing. Later, he was noticed by the art collector, Tomasz Zieliński and went to live with him in Kielce. It was there he met Franciszek Kostrzewski, who gave him his first drawing lessons and helped convince his father to let him pursue a career in art. With some assistance from Zieliński, he enrolled at the School of Fine Arts in Warsaw, which he attended from 1853 to 1857, studying with Chrystian Breslauer and Juliusz Kossak. He also took private lessons with Wojciech Gerson.

After 1856, he lived in Volyn, where he painted en plein aire. He also worked for a steamship company, providing decorations for their passenger ships and participated in the first National Exhibition of Fine Arts, in Warsaw.

In 1860, he received a scholarship to study in Paris. Shortly after arriving, he became a friend of Cyprian Kamil Norwid, who helped him get commissions. Two years later, his health began to decline but, having become financially successful he was able to travel to Switzerland for rest and recreation. In 1868, he returned to Poland, where he set up a studio in the Tatras. After failing to obtain a professorship at the Academy of Fine Arts in Krakow, he decided to go back to Paris.

He was soon married and had a son, but fell into a depression when the child died. They remained in Paris during the Franco-Prussian War and the Commune but, without any patrons, he soon began to suffer financially and his health worsened due to hunger and various other hardships. Although he had another son and won a medal at an exhibition in London, he never recovered, physically or financially, which led to his premature death, at the age of forty-three.

== Selected paintings ==
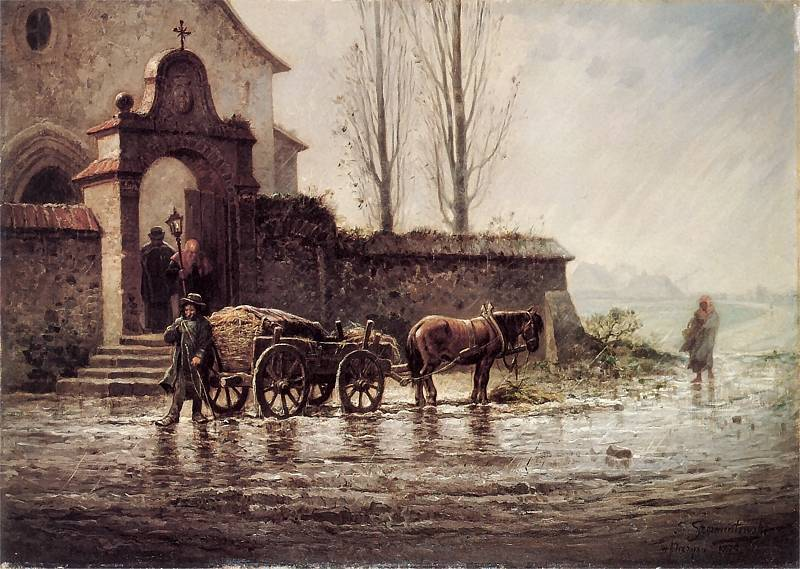
The Wind in Your Eyes

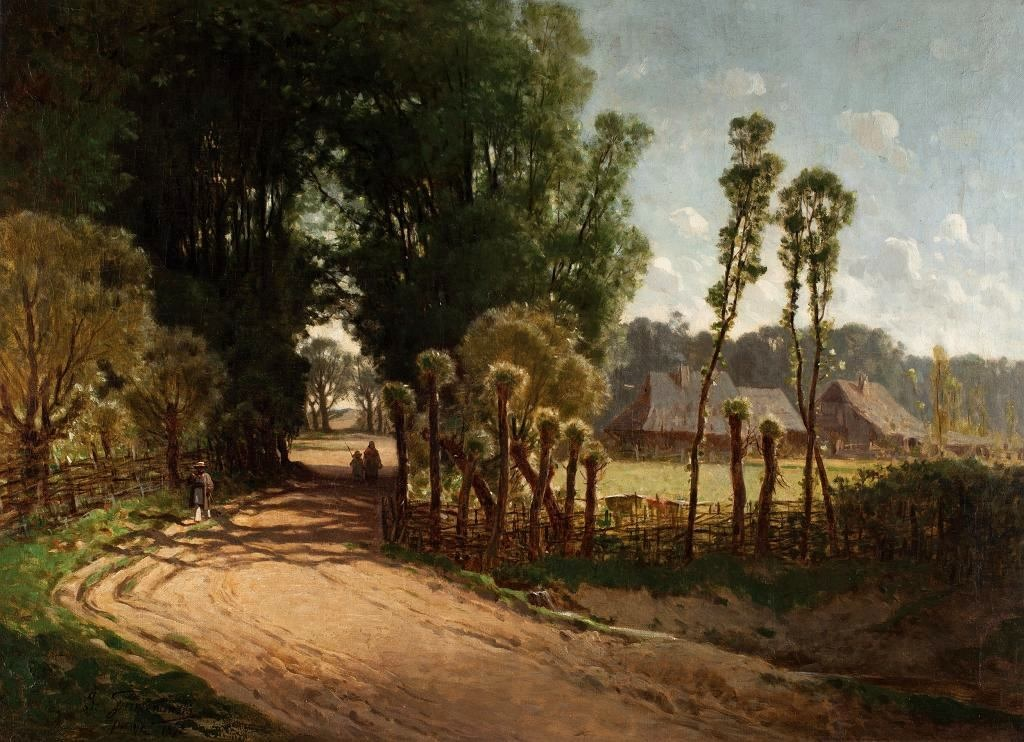
Road to the Village

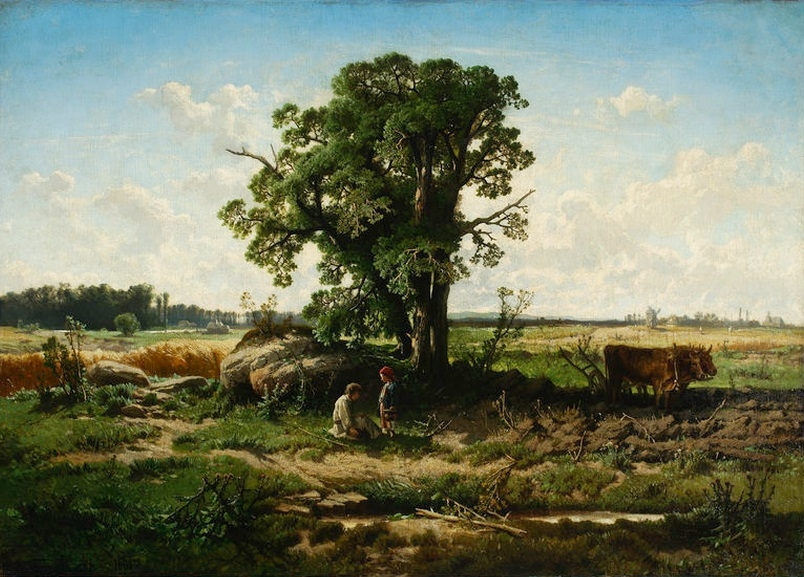
The Ploughman's Rest

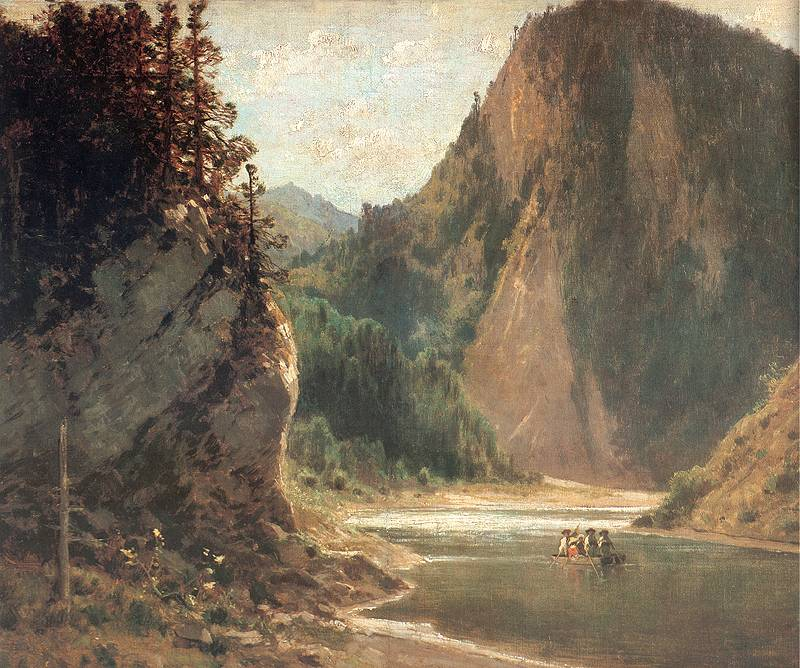
The Pieniny Mountains

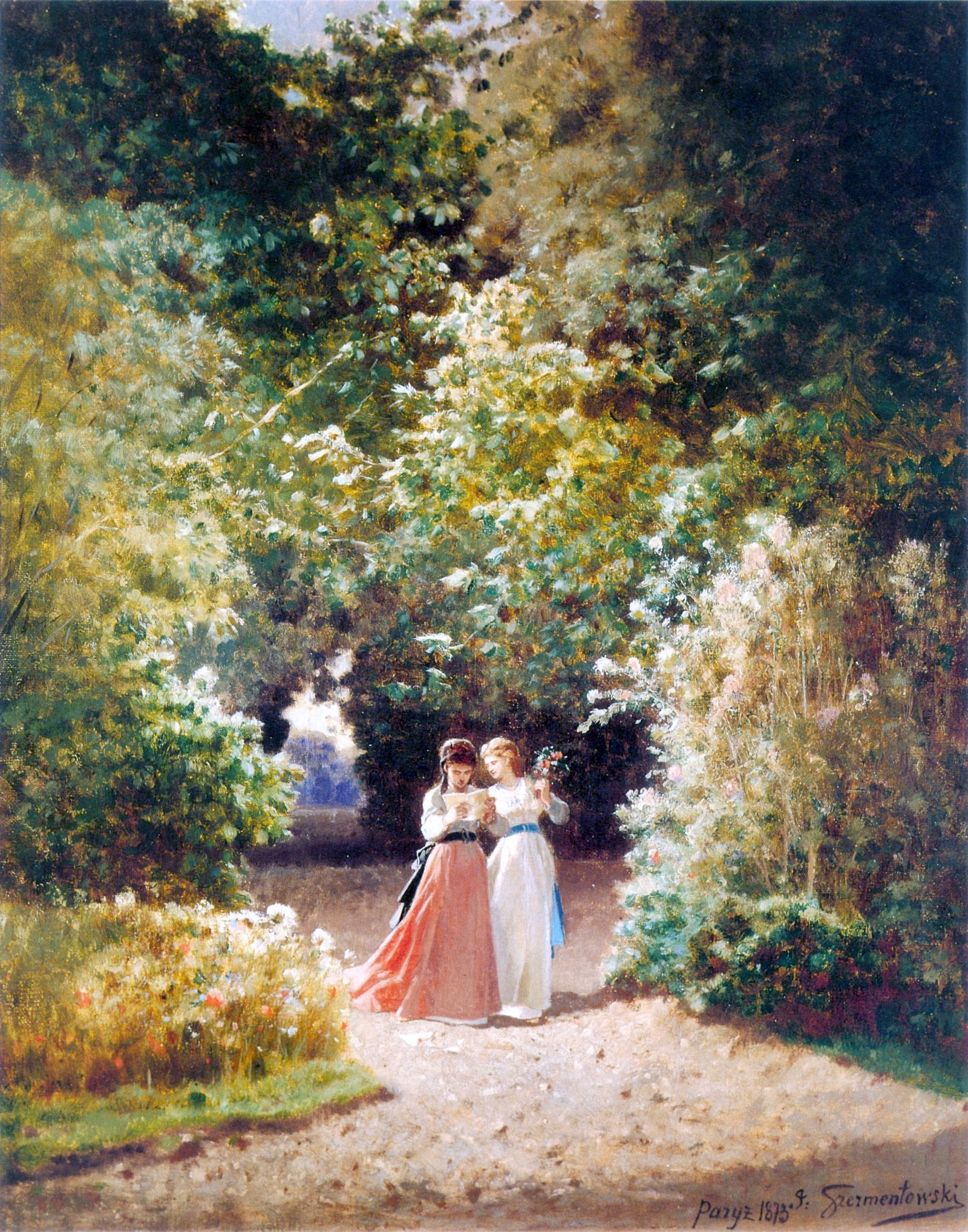
In the Park
