= Sypniewo =

Sypniewo may refer to:

- Sypniewo, part of the Nowe Miasto district of Poznań
- Sypniewo, Chodzież County in Greater Poland Voivodeship (west-central Poland)
- Sypniewo, Złotów County in Greater Poland Voivodeship (west-central Poland)
- Sypniewo, Kuyavian-Pomeranian Voivodeship (north-central Poland)
- Sypniewo, Masovian Voivodeship (east-central Poland)
