= Skoraszewice =

- Village
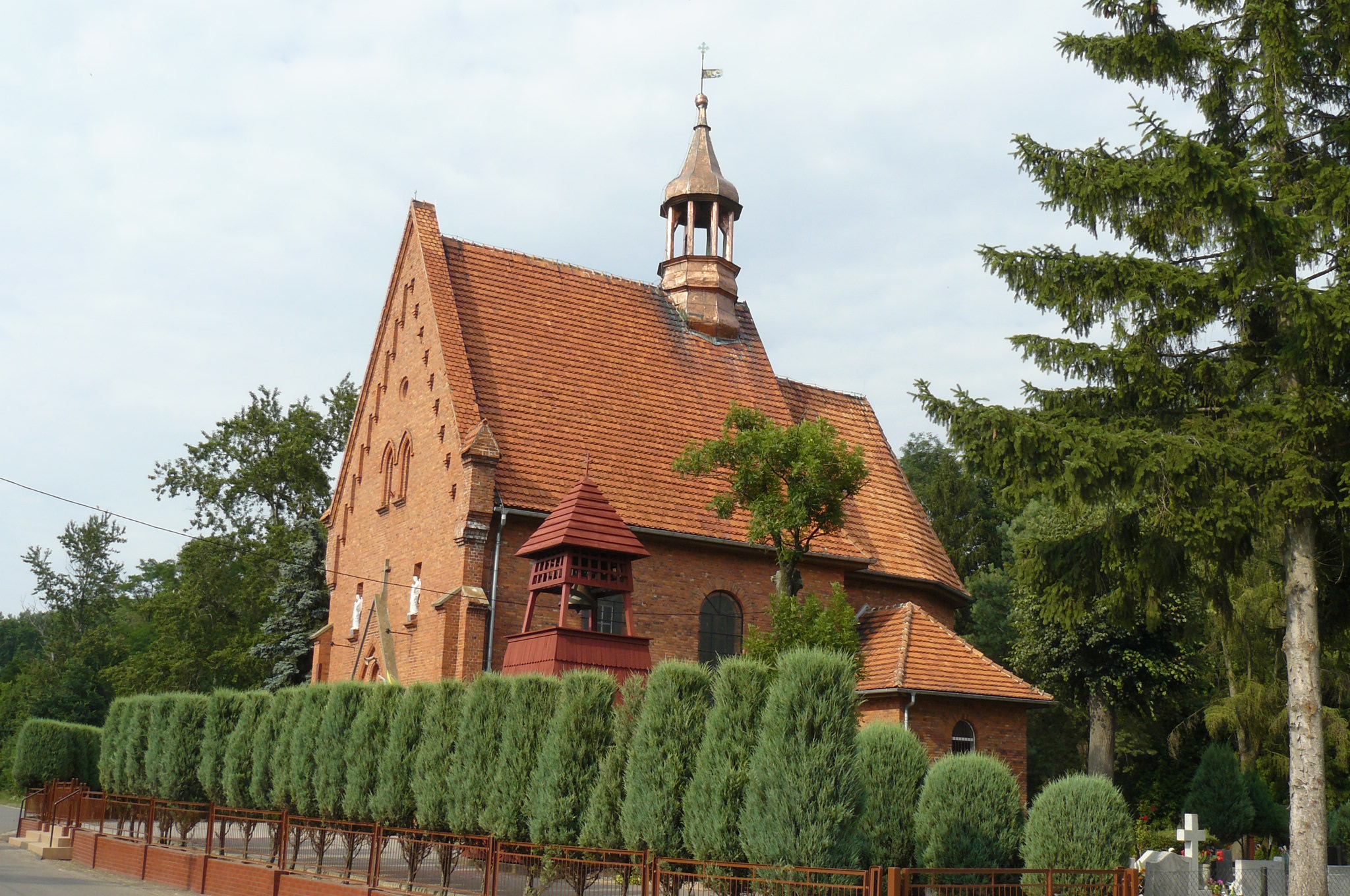
- Church of Saint Catherine of Alexandria

- Location within Poland
- Coordinates: 51°43′N 17°4′E
- Country: Poland
- Voivodeship: Greater Poland
- County: Gostyń
- Gmina: Pępowo

Skoraszewice [skɔraʂɛˈvit͡sɛ] is a village in the administrative district of Gmina Pępowo, within Gostyń County, Greater Poland Voivodeship, in west-central Poland.
