= Adolf Piwarski =

Polish miniaturist painter and graphic artist

Adolf Piwarski (1817–1870) was a Polish miniaturist painter and graphic artist. His father, Jan Feliks Piwarski (1794–1859), was also a famous Polish painter and graphic designer, founder of the print room at Warsaw University.
