= Kreis Filehne =

District of Prussia

Coordinates: 52°53′32″N 16°10′25″E

Location of Kreis Filehne

Kreis Filehne was a district in Regierungsbezirk Bromberg, in the Prussian Province of Posen from 1887 to 1920.

== History ==
On 1 October 1887 the new Filehne district was formed from the western part of the Czarnikau district as part of a major district reform in the province of Posen. The capital of the new district was Filehne.

Division of the district in 1920

As a result of the Treaty of Versailles, the district was dissolved and divided on 10 January 1920. The area south of the Netze river became part of Poland. The area north of the river remained in Germany and became part of the Netzekreis in the province of Posen-West Prussia.

== Demographics ==
According to the Prussian census of 1905, the district had a population of 32,669, of which 72% were Germans and 28% were Poles.

== Table of Standesämter ==
"Standesamt" is the German name of the local civil registration offices which were established in October 1874 soon after the German Empire was formed. Births, marriages and deaths were recorded. Previously, only the church records were used for Christians.

| Standesamt | Polish name |
| Altsorge | Kwiejce Stare |
| Eichberg | Dębogóra |
| Filehne | Wieleń |
| Glashütte | Huta Szklana |
| Groß Drensen | Dzierżążno Wielkie |
| Grünfier | Zielonowo |
| Kreuz | Krzyż |
| Nothwendig | Potrzebowice |
| Prossekel | Przesieki |
| Rosko | Rosko |
| Schneidemühlchen | Piłka |
| Waldmühle | Borzysko |
