= Biała =

Biała (the feminine form of Polish biały 'white') may refer to:

== Cities and towns in Poland ==
=== Greater Poland Voivodeship (west-central Poland) ===
- Biała, Gmina Trzcianka
- Biała, Gmina Wieleń
- Biała, Kalisz County
- Biała, Konin County

=== Łódź Voivodeship (central Poland) ===
- Biała, Kutno County
- Biała, Pajęczno County
- Biała, Piotrków County
- Biała, Zgierz County
- Biała, Wieluń County
- Biała Góra, Łęczyca County
- Biała Góra, Poddębice County
- Biała Rawska

=== Lower Silesian Voivodeship (south-west Poland) ===
- Biała, Legnica County
- Biała, Świdnica County
- Biała, former name of the town of Bielawa

=== Lublin Voivodeship (east Poland) ===
- Biała, Lublin Voivodeship
- Biała Podlaska
- Biała, former name of the town of Janów Lubelski

=== Masovian Voivodeship (east-central Poland) ===
- Biała, Masovian Voivodeship
- Biała Góra, Masovian Voivodeship

=== Pomeranian Voivodeship (north Poland) ===
- Biała, Bytów County
- Biała, Wejherowo County
- Biała Góra, Pomeranian Voivodeship

=== Silesian Voivodeship (south Poland) ===
- Bielsko-Biała, formed in 1951 by the merger of the towns of Bielsko and Biała

=== Warmian-Masurian Voivodeship (north Poland) ===
- Biała Góra, Warmian-Masurian Voivodeship
- Biała Piska

=== West Pomeranian Voivodeship (north-west Poland) ===
- Biała, Stargard County
- Biała, Szczecinek County
- Biała Góra, West Pomeranian Voivodeship

=== Other voivodeships ===
- Biała, in Opole Voivodeship (south Poland)
- Biała Krakowska, since 1950 part of Bielsko-Biała, in Silesian Voivodeship (south Poland)
- Biała, Rzeszów, since 2009 part of Rzeszów, in Subcarpathian Voivodeship (south-east Poland)
- Biała, Kuyavian-Pomeranian Voivodeship (north-central Poland)
- Biała, Podlaskie Voivodeship (north-east Poland)

== Rivers ==
- Biała (Dunajec), tributary of the Dunajec
- Biała (Supraśl), tributary of the Supraśl
- Biała (Vistula), tributary of the Vistula
- Bělá (Eastern Neisse), called Biała Głuchołaska in Polish, tributary of the Eastern Neisse
- Biała Lądecka, tributary of the Eastern Neisse

== Other uses ==
- Biala, New South Wales, a hamlet in Australia
  - Parish of Biala
- Biala (Hasidic dynasty), a Hasidic dynasty from Biała Podlaska
- Feminine form of the surname Biały
- ZSU-23-4MP Biała, Polish self-propelled anti-aircraft gun

== See also ==
- Byala (disambiguation)
- Biela (disambiguation)
