= Sierakówko, Greater Poland Voivodeship =

Sierakówko
- Village
- Location within Poland
- Coordinates: 52°47′N 16°47′E
- Country: Poland
- Voivodeship: Greater Poland
- County: Czarnków-Trzcianka
- Gmina: Połajewo

Sierakówko [ɕɛraˈkufkɔ] (German: Zirkowko) is a village in the administrative district of Gmina Połajewo, within Czarnków-Trzcianka County, Greater Poland Voivodeship, in west-central Poland.
