= Łomnica-Folwark =

- Settlement
- Location within Poland
- Coordinates: 53°6′30″N 16°29′55″E
- Country: Poland
- Voivodeship: Greater Poland
- County: Czarnków-Trzcianka
- Gmina: Trzcianka

Łomnica-Folwark ([wɔmˈnit͡sa ˈfɔlvark]; German: Vorwerk Lemnitz) is a settlement in the administrative district of Gmina Trzcianka, within Czarnków-Trzcianka County, Greater Poland Voivodeship, in west-central Poland.
