= Pokrzywno =

Pokrzywno may refer to the following places in Poland:

- Pokrzywno, part of the Nowe Miasto district of Poznań
- Pokrzywno, Greater Poland Voivodeship (west-central Poland)
- Pokrzywno, Grudziądz County in Kuyavian-Pomeranian Voivodeship (north-central Poland)
- Pokrzywno, Toruń County in Kuyavian-Pomeranian Voivodeship (north-central Poland)
- Pokrzywno, Lower Silesian Voivodeship (south-west Poland)
- Pokrzywno, Pomeranian Voivodeship (north Poland)
- Pokrzywno, West Pomeranian Voivodeship (north-west Poland)
