= Łomnica, Czarnków-Trzcianka County =

Łomnica
- Village
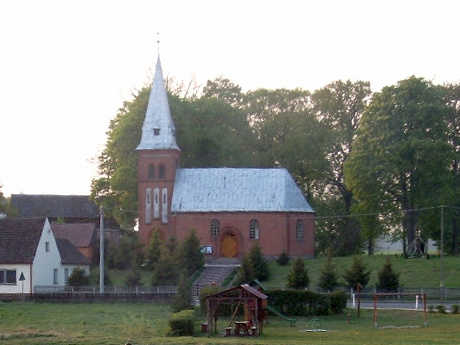
- Church of Virgin Mary, Queen of Poland

- Location within Poland
- Coordinates: 53°5′57″N 16°32′6″E
- Country: Poland
- Voivodeship: Greater Poland
- County: Czarnków-Trzcianka
- Gmina: Trzcianka

Population
  - Total: 300

Łomnica ([wɔmˈnit͡sa]; German: Lemnitz) is a village in the administrative district of Gmina Trzcianka, within Czarnków-Trzcianka County, Greater Poland Voivodeship, in west-central Poland.
