= Rzeczyn, Greater Poland Voivodeship =

Rzeczyn
- Village
- Location within Poland
- Coordinates: 52°54′31″N 16°00′59″E
- Country: Poland
- Voivodeship: Greater Poland
- County: Czarnków-Trzcianka
- Gmina: Krzyż Wielkopolski

Rzeczyn [ˈʐɛt͡ʂɨn] is a village in the administrative district of Gmina Krzyż Wielkopolski, within Czarnków-Trzcianka County, Greater Poland Voivodeship, in west-central Poland.
