= Goraj, Greater Poland Voivodeship =

Goraj
- Village
- Location within Poland
- Coordinates: 52°52′N 16°30′E
- Country: Poland
- Voivodeship: Greater Poland
- County: Czarnków-Trzcianka
- Gmina: Lubasz

Goraj [ˈɡɔrai̯] is a village in the administrative district of Gmina Lubasz, within Czarnków-Trzcianka County, Greater Poland Voivodeship, in west-central Poland.
