= Dębe, Czarnków-Trzcianka County =

Dębe
- Village
- Location within Poland
- Coordinates: 52°52′36″N 16°32′34″E
- Country: Poland
- Voivodeship: Greater Poland
- County: Czarnków-Trzcianka
- Gmina: Lubasz

Dębe [ˈdɛmbɛ] is a village in the administrative district of Gmina Lubasz, within Czarnków-Trzcianka County, Greater Poland Voivodeship, in west-central Poland.
