= Prusinowo =

Prusinowo may refer to the following places:

- Prusinowo, Czarnków-Trzcianka County in Greater Poland Voivodeship (west-central Poland)
- Prusinowo, Poznań County in Greater Poland Voivodeship (west-central Poland)
- Prusinowo, Pomeranian Voivodeship (north Poland)
- Prusinowo, Działdowo County in Warmian-Masurian Voivodeship (north Poland)
- Prusinowo, Mrągowo County in Warmian-Masurian Voivodeship (north Poland)
- Prusinowo, Gryfice County in West Pomeranian Voivodeship (north-west Poland)
- Prusinowo, Łobez County in West Pomeranian Voivodeship (north-west Poland)
