= Stajkowo, Greater Poland Voivodeship =

Stajkowao
- Village
- Location within Poland
- Coordinates: 52°50′N 16°30′E
- Country: Poland
- Voivodeship: Greater Poland
- County: Czarnków-Trzcianka
- Gmina: Lubasz
- Population (approx.): 1,390

Stajkowo [stai̯ˈkɔvɔ] (German: Bismarckshöhe) is a village in the administrative district of Gmina Lubasz, within Czarnków-Trzcianka County, Greater Poland Voivodeship, in west-central Poland.

The village has an approximate population of 1,390.
