= Pańska Łaska =

- Village
- Location within Poland
- Coordinates: 53°3′55″N 16°25′29″E
- Country: Poland
- Voivodeship: Greater Poland
- County: Czarnków-Trzcianka
- Gmina: Trzcianka

Pańska Łaska (Polish pronunciation: [ˈpaj̃ska ˈwaska]) is a village in the administrative district of Gmina Trzcianka, within Czarnków-Trzcianka County, Greater Poland Voivodeship, in west-central Poland.
