= Smolarnia =

Smolarnia may refer to the following places:

- Smolarnia, Czarnków-Trzcianka County in Greater Poland Voivodeship (west-central Poland)
- Smolarnia, Konin County in Greater Poland Voivodeship (west-central Poland)
- Smolarnia, Masovian Voivodeship (east-central Poland)
- Smolarnia, Opole Voivodeship (south-west Poland)
