= Krosin =

- Village
- Location within Poland
- Coordinates: 52°48′N 16°40′E
- Country: Poland
- Voivodeship: Greater Poland
- County: Czarnków-Trzcianka
- Gmina: Połajewo

Krosin [ˈkrɔɕin] is a village in the administrative district of Gmina Połajewo, within Czarnków-Trzcianka County, Greater Poland Voivodeship, in west-central Poland.
