= Marylin, Greater Poland Voivodeship =

Marylin
- Village
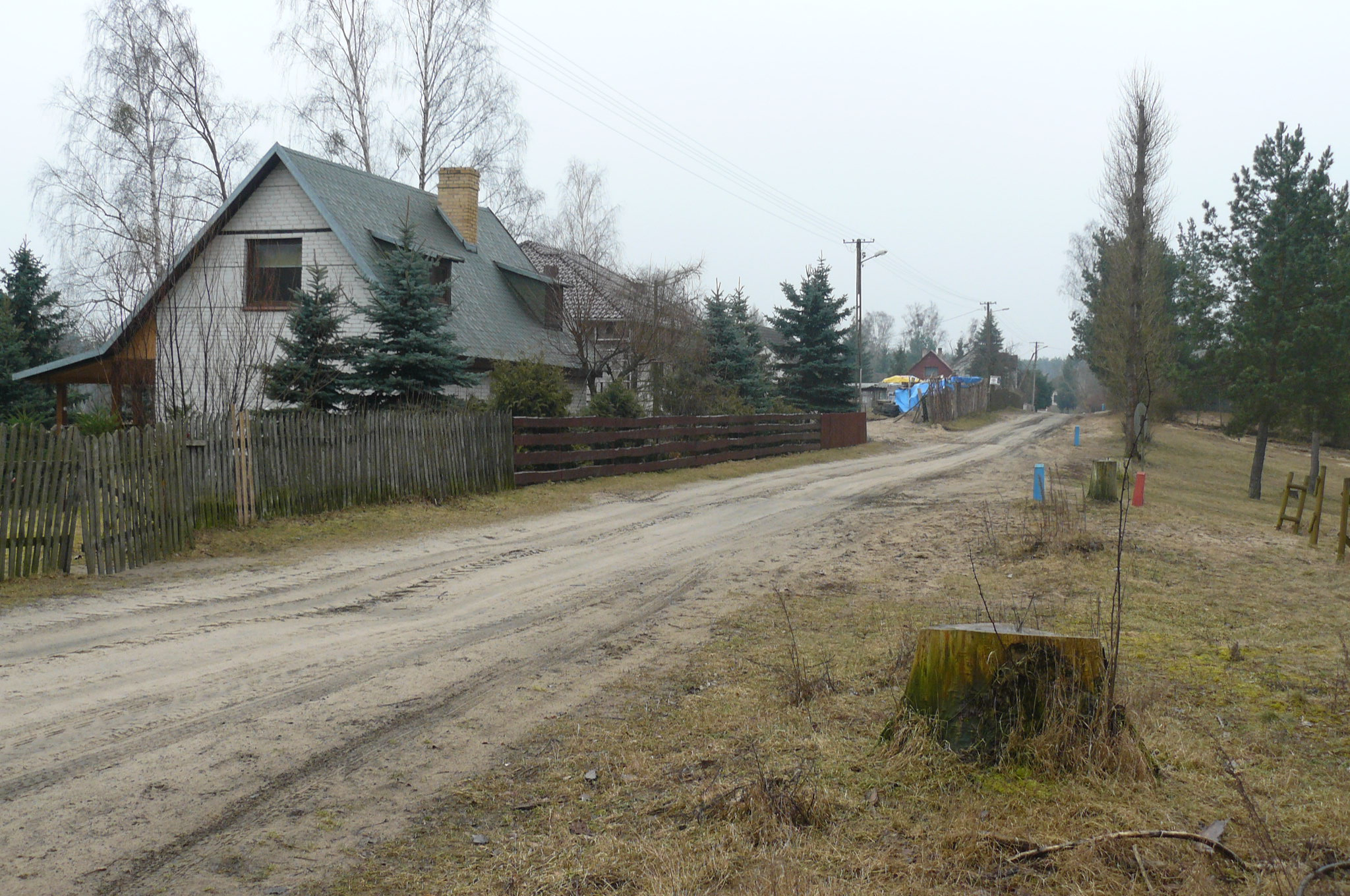
- Street of Marylin, Greater Poland Voivodeship

- Location within Poland
- Coordinates: 52°47′30″N 16°06′30″E
- Country: Poland
- Voivodeship: Greater Poland
- County: Czarnków-Trzcianka
- Gmina: Drawsko

Marylin [maˈrɨlin] (German: Marianowo) is a village in the administrative district of Gmina Drawsko, within Czarnków-Trzcianka County, Greater Poland Voivodeship, in west-central Poland.
