= Kuźniczka =

Kuźniczka may refer to the following places:

- Kuźniczka, Greater Poland Voivodeship (west-central Poland)
- Kuźniczka, Opole Voivodeship (south-west Poland)
- Kuźniczka, Silesian Voivodeship (south Poland)
