= Lubcz Wielki =

- Village
- Location within Poland
- Coordinates: 52°53′N 16°3′E
- Country: Poland
- Voivodeship: Greater Poland
- County: Czarnków-Trzcianka
- Gmina: Krzyż Wielkopolski

Lubcz Wielki (Polish pronunciation: [luptʂ ˈfjɛlkʲi]; German: Groß Lubs) is a village in the administrative district of Gmina Krzyż Wielkopolski, within Czarnków-Trzcianka County, Greater Poland Voivodeship, in west-central Poland.
