= Dłużewo =

- Village
- Location within Poland
- Coordinates: 53°5′10″N 16°29′1″E
- Country: Poland
- Voivodeship: Greater Poland
- County: Czarnków-Trzcianka
- Gmina: Trzcianka

Dłużewo ([dwuˈʐɛvɔ]; German: Karlshorst) is a village in the administrative district of Gmina Trzcianka, within Czarnków-Trzcianka County, Greater Poland Voivodeship, in west-central Poland.
