= Zacisze, Czarnków-Trzcianka County =

Zacisze
- Village
- Location within Poland
- Coordinates: 52°59′15″N 15°59′13″E
- Country: Poland
- Voivodeship: Greater Poland
- County: Czarnków-Trzcianka
- Gmina: Krzyż Wielkopolski

Zacisze [zaˈt͡ɕiʂɛ] is a village in the administrative district of Gmina Krzyż Wielkopolski, within Czarnków-Trzcianka County, Greater Poland Voivodeship, in west-central Poland.
