= Osiniec, Czarnków-Trzcianka County =

Osiniec
- Village
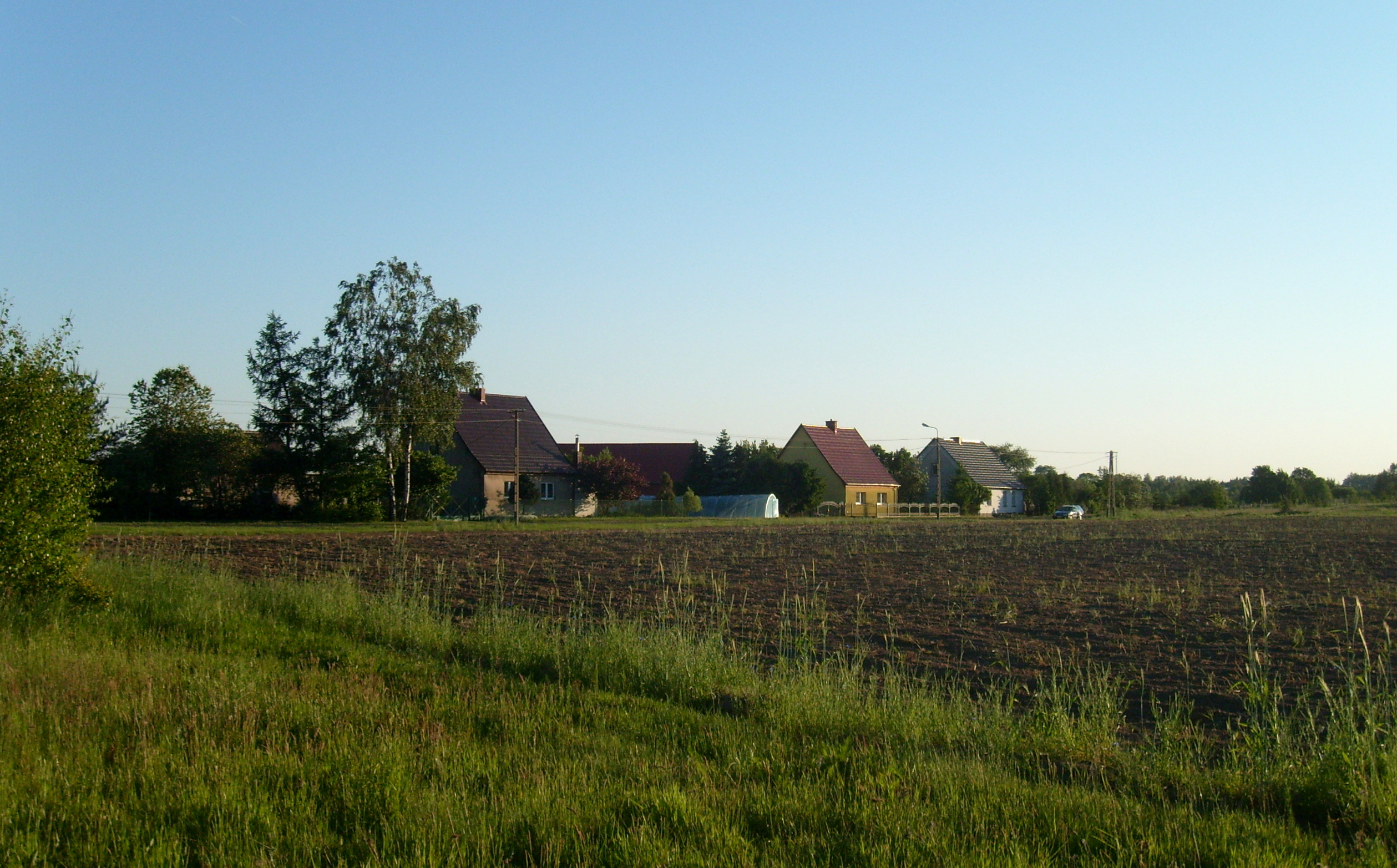
- Fields in Osienic

- Location within Poland
- Coordinates: 53°02′03″N 16°29′55″E
- Country: Poland
- Voivodeship: Greater Poland
- County: Czarnków-Trzcianka
- Gmina: Trzcianka

Osiniec [ɔˈɕiɲɛt͡s] is a village in the administrative district of Gmina Trzcianka, within Czarnków-Trzcianka County, Greater Poland Voivodeship, in west-central Poland. Until the late 1980s, there was a small grass airport near the village, where agricultural planes, including An-2s, were stationed.
