= Kocień Wielki =

- Village
- Location within Poland
- Coordinates: 52°58′N 16°15′E
- Country: Poland
- Voivodeship: Greater Poland
- County: Czarnków-Trzcianka
- Gmina: Wieleń

Kocień Wielki (Polish pronunciation: [ˈkɔtɕɛj̃ ˈvjɛlkʲi]) is a village in the administrative district of Gmina Wieleń, within Czarnków-Trzcianka County, Greater Poland Voivodeship, in west-central Poland.
