= Kochanówka =

Kochanówka may refer to the following places:

- Kochanówka, Greater Poland Voivodeship (west-central Poland)
- Kochanówka, Masovian Voivodeship (east-central Poland)
- Kochanówka, Subcarpathian Voivodeship (south-east Poland)
- Kochanówka, Warmian-Masurian Voivodeship (north Poland)
