= Nowina =

Nowina may refer to:

- the Nowina coat of arms
- Nowina, Lower Silesian Voivodeship (south-west Poland)
- Nowina, Czarnków-Trzcianka County in Greater Poland Voivodeship (west-central Poland)
- Nowina, Piła County in Greater Poland Voivodeship (west-central Poland)
- Nowina, Szamotuły County in Greater Poland Voivodeship (west-central Poland)
- Nowina, Pomeranian Voivodeship (north Poland)
- Nowina, Warmian-Masurian Voivodeship (north Poland)
- Juliusz Nowina-Sokolnicki (1925–2009), Polish politician
- Piotr Nowina-Konopka (1949–2025), Polish academic, politician and diplomat
