= Moczydła =

Moczydła may refer to the following places:

- Moczydła, Pajęczno County in Łódź Voivodeship (south-central Poland)
- Moczydła, Radomsko County in Łódź Voivodeship (south-central Poland)
- Moczydła, Masovian Voivodeship (east-central Poland)
- Moczydła, Czarnków-Trzcianka County in Greater Poland Voivodeship (west-central Poland)
- Moczydła, Koło County in Greater Poland Voivodeship (central Poland)
- Moczydła, Turek County in Greater Poland Voivodeship (central Poland)
- Moczydła, Pomeranian Voivodeship (north Poland)
