= Teresin-Karczma =

- Settlement
- Location within Poland
- Coordinates: 53°0′41″N 16°30′0″E
- Country: Poland
- Voivodeship: Greater Poland
- County: Czarnków-Trzcianka
- Gmina: Trzcianka

Teresin-Karczma (Polish pronunciation: [tɛˈrɛɕiŋ ˈkartʂma]) is a settlement in the administrative district of Gmina Trzcianka, within Czarnków-Trzcianka County, Greater Poland Voivodeship, in west-central Poland.
