= Karcze =

Karcze may refer to the following places:

- Karcze, Greater Poland Voivodeship (west-central Poland)
- Karcze, Masovian Voivodeship (east-central Poland)
- Karcze, Podlaskie Voivodeship (north-east Poland)
