= Smolary =

Smolary may refer to the following places:

- Smolary, Czarnków-Trzcianka County in Greater Poland Voivodeship (west-central Poland)
- Smolary, Gniezno County in Greater Poland Voivodeship (west-central Poland)
- Smolary, Kuyavian-Pomeranian Voivodeship (north-central Poland)
- Smolary, West Pomeranian Voivodeship (north-west Poland)
