= Teresin, Greater Poland Voivodeship =

Teresin
- Village
- Location within Poland
- Coordinates: 53°1′N 16°30′E
- Country: Poland
- Voivodeship: Greater Poland
- County: Czarnków-Trzcianka
- Gmina: Trzcianka

Teresin ([tɛˈrɛɕin]; German: Theresia) is a village in the administrative district of Gmina Trzcianka, within Czarnków-Trzcianka County, Greater Poland Voivodeship, in west-central Poland.
