= Neuteich =

Neuteich may refer to:

- Nowy Staw (German: Neuteich), Poland
- Raczki, West Pomeranian Voivodeship (German: Neuteich), Poland
- Chełst, Greater Poland Voivodeship (German: Neuteich), Poland
- Marian Neuteich
