= Wrzeszczyna =

- Village
- Location within Poland
- Coordinates: 52°52′N 16°14′E
- Country: Poland
- Voivodeship: Greater Poland
- County: Czarnków-Trzcianka
- Gmina: Wieleń
- Population: 530

Wrzeszczyna [vʐɛʂˈt͡ʂɨna] is a village in the administrative district of Gmina Wieleń, within Czarnków-Trzcianka County, Greater Poland Voivodeship, in west-central Poland.
