= Wapniarnia Trzecia =

- Village
- Location within Poland
- Coordinates: 53°03′57″N 16°30′07″E
- Country: Poland
- Voivodeship: Greater Poland
- County: Czarnków-Trzcianka
- Gmina: Trzcianka

Wapniarnia Trzecia [vapˈɲarɲa ˈtʂɛt͡ɕa] is a village in the administrative district of Gmina Trzcianka, within Czarnków-Trzcianka County, Greater Poland Voivodeship, in west-central Poland.
