= Wrząca =

Wrząca may refer to the following places:

- Wrząca, Pabianice County in Łódź Voivodeship (central Poland)
- Wrząca, Sieradz County in Łódź Voivodeship (central Poland)
- Wrząca, Masovian Voivodeship (central Poland)
- Wrząca, Czarnków-Trzcianka County in Greater Poland Voivodeship (west-central Poland)
- Wrząca, Kalisz County in Greater Poland Voivodeship (central Poland)
- Wrząca, Turek County in Greater Poland Voivodeship (central Poland)
- Wrząca, Pomeranian Voivodeship (north Poland)
