= Klempicz =

- Village
- Location within Poland
- Coordinates: 52°46′01″N 16°29′34″E
- Country: Poland
- Voivodeship: Greater Poland
- County: Czarnków-Trzcianka
- Gmina: Lubasz

Klempicz [ˈklɛmpit͡ʂ] is a village in the administrative district of Gmina Lubasz, within Czarnków-Trzcianka County, Greater Poland Voivodeship, in west-central Poland. It is a possible location for a planned second Polish nuclear power plant (NPP "Warta-Klempicz").
