= Jędrzejewo =

Jędrzejewo may refer to the following places:

- Jędrzejewo, Gmina Czarnków in Greater Poland Voivodeship (west-central Poland)
- Jędrzejewo, Kuyavian-Pomeranian Voivodeship (north-central Poland)
- Jędrzejewo, Masovian Voivodeship (east-central Poland)
- Jędrzejewo, Gmina Lubasz in Greater Poland Voivodeship (west-central Poland)
