= Bończa =

Bończa may refer to the following places:

- Bończa, Greater Poland Voivodeship (west-central Poland)
- Bończa, Lublin Voivodeship (east Poland)
- Bończa, Masovian Voivodeship (east-central Poland)
