= Runowo, Czarnków-Trzcianka County =

Runowo
- Village
- Location within Poland
- Coordinates: 52°58′N 16°26′E
- Country: Poland
- Voivodeship: Greater Poland
- County: Czarnków-Trzcianka
- Gmina: Trzcianka
- Population: 375

Runowo ([ruˈnɔvɔ]; German: Runau) is a village in the administrative district of Gmina Trzcianka, within Czarnków-Trzcianka County, Greater Poland Voivodeship, in west-central Poland.
