= Krosinek =

- Village
- Location within Poland
- Coordinates: 52°49′N 16°41′E
- Country: Poland
- Voivodeship: Greater Poland
- County: Czarnków-Trzcianka
- Gmina: Połajewo

Krosinek [krɔˈɕinɛk] is a village in the administrative district of Gmina Połajewo, within Czarnków-Trzcianka County, Greater Poland Voivodeship, in west-central Poland.
