= Nowe Kwiejce =

- Village
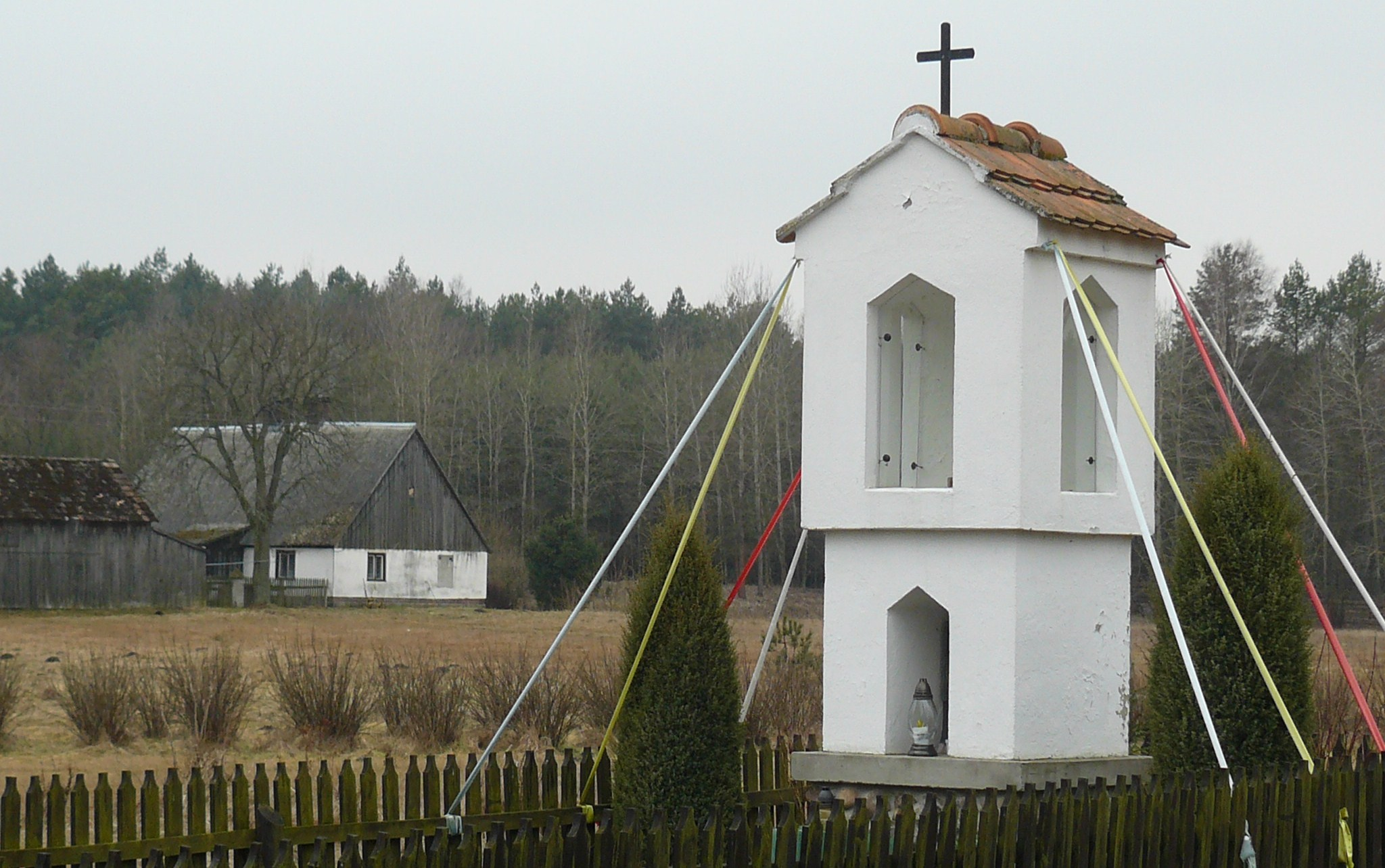
- Wayside shrine in Nowe Kwiejce

- Location within Poland
- Coordinates: 52°44′59″N 16°00′00″E
- Country: Poland
- Voivodeship: Greater Poland
- County: Czarnków-Trzcianka
- Gmina: Drawsko

Nowe Kwiejce [ˈnɔvɛ ˈkfjɛi̯t͡sɛ] (German: Neusorge) is a village in the administrative district of Gmina Drawsko, within Czarnków-Trzcianka County, Greater Poland Voivodeship, in west-central Poland.
