= Sarcz =

- Village
- Location within Poland
- Coordinates: 53°04′15″N 16°26′53″E
- Country: Poland
- Voivodeship: Greater Poland
- County: Czarnków-Trzcianka
- Gmina: Trzcianka

Sarcz ([sart͡ʂ]; German: Zaskerhütte) is a village in the administrative district of Gmina Trzcianka, within Czarnków-Trzcianka County, Greater Poland Voivodeship, in west-central Poland.

As of 2011, the village had 190 inhabitants.
