= Elżbiecin, Greater Poland Voivodeship =

Elżbiecin
- Village
- Location within Poland
- Coordinates: 52°47′38″N 16°30′44″E
- Country: Poland
- Voivodeship: Greater Poland
- County: Czarnków-Trzcianka
- Gmina: Lubasz

Elżbiecin [ɛlʐˈbjɛt͡ɕin] is a village in the administrative district of Gmina Lubasz, within Czarnków-Trzcianka County, Greater Poland Voivodeship, in west-central Poland.
