= Kałądek =

- Village
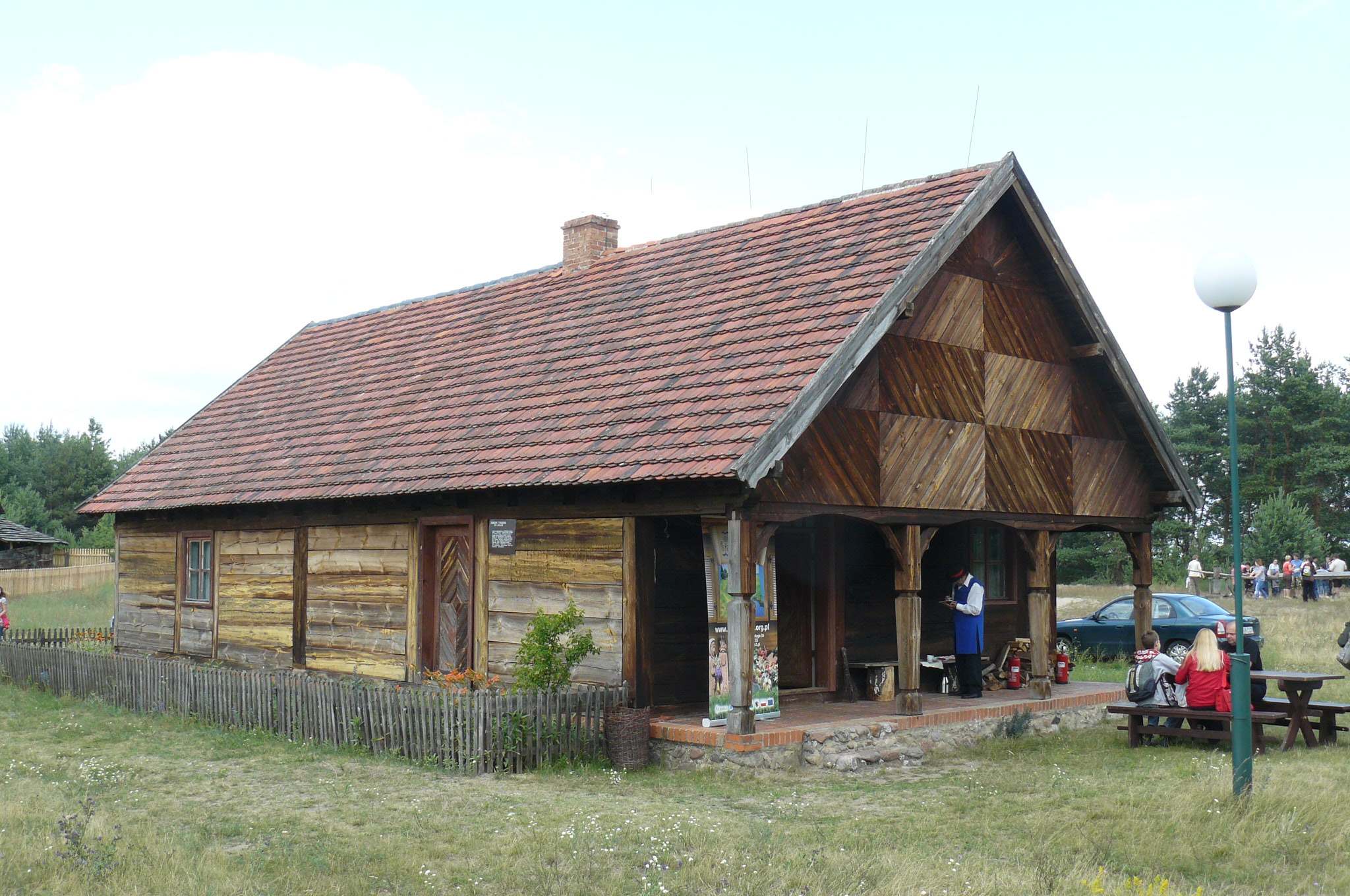

- Location within Poland
- Coordinates: 52°54′25″N 16°12′11″E
- Country: Poland
- Voivodeship: Greater Poland
- County: Czarnków-Trzcianka
- Gmina: Wieleń
- Population: 96

Kałądek [kaˈwɔndɛk] is a village in the administrative district of Gmina Wieleń, within Czarnków-Trzcianka County, Greater Poland Voivodeship, in west-central Poland.
