= Łomnica-Młyn =

- Settlement
- Location within Poland
- Coordinates: 53°6′11″N 16°34′14″E
- Country: Poland
- Voivodeship: Greater Poland
- County: Czarnków-Trzcianka
- Gmina: Trzcianka

Łomnica-Młyn ([wɔmˈnit͡sa ˈmwɨn]; German: Lemnitz Mühle) is a settlement in the administrative district of Gmina Trzcianka, within Czarnków-Trzcianka County, Greater Poland Voivodeship, in west-central Poland.
