= Kadłubek, Greater Poland Voivodeship =

Kadłubek
- Village
- Location within Poland
- Coordinates: 53°2′20″N 16°29′54″E
- Country: Poland
- Voivodeship: Greater Poland
- County: Czarnków-Trzcianka
- Gmina: Trzcianka
- Population: 20

Kadłubek [kaˈdwubɛk] is a village in the administrative district of Gmina Trzcianka, within Czarnków-Trzcianka County, Greater Poland Voivodeship, in west-central Poland.
