= Nowa Wieś, Czarnków-Trzcianka County =

Nowa Wieś
- Village
- Location within Poland
- Coordinates: 53°0′3″N 16°27′20″E
- Country: Poland
- Voivodeship: Greater Poland
- County: Czarnków-Trzcianka
- Gmina: Trzcianka
- Population: 370

Nowa Wieś ([ˈnɔva ˈvjɛɕ]; German: Neudorf) is a village in the administrative district of Gmina Trzcianka, within Czarnków-Trzcianka County, Greater Poland Voivodeship, in west-central Poland.
