= Rudka, Czarnków-Trzcianka County =

Rudka
- Village
- Location within Poland
- Coordinates: 52°59′N 16°27′E
- Country: Poland
- Voivodeship: Greater Poland
- County: Czarnków-Trzcianka
- Gmina: Trzcianka

Rudka ([ˈrutka]; German: Hütte) is a village in the administrative district of Gmina Trzcianka, within Czarnków-Trzcianka County, Greater Poland Voivodeship, in west-central Poland.
