= Pełcza =

- Village
- Location within Poland
- Coordinates: 52°49′42″N 15°54′45″E
- Country: Poland
- Voivodeship: Greater Poland
- County: Czarnków-Trzcianka
- Gmina: Drawsko

Pełcza [ˈpɛu̯t͡ʂa] (German: Friedrichslust) is a village in the administrative district of Gmina Drawsko, within Czarnków-Trzcianka County, Greater Poland Voivodeship, in west-central Poland.
