= Pestkownica =

Village in Greater Poland Voivodeship, Poland

- Village in the middle of forest - Puszcza Drawska
- Location within Poland
- Coordinates: 53°01′02″N 16°02′19″E
- Country: Poland
- Voivodeship: Greater Poland
- County: Czarnków-Trzcianka
- Gmina: Krzyż Wielkopolski
- Elevation: 60 m (200 ft)
- Population: 6

Pestkownica [pɛstkɔvˈnit͡sa] is a village in the administrative district of Gmina Krzyż Wielkopolski, within Czarnków-Trzcianka County, Greater Poland Voivodeship, in west-central Poland.
