= Krucz =

- Village
- Location within Poland
- Coordinates: 52°50′45″N 16°24′48″E
- Country: Poland
- Voivodeship: Greater Poland
- County: Czarnków-Trzcianka
- Gmina: Lubasz
- Population (approx.): 500

Krucz [krut͡ʂ] is a village in the administrative district of Gmina Lubasz, within Czarnków-Trzcianka County, Greater Poland Voivodeship, in west-central Poland.

The village has an approximate population of 500.
