= Żelichowo, Greater Poland Voivodeship =

Żelichowo
- Village
- Location within Poland
- Coordinates: 52°59′58″N 16°05′09″E
- Country: Poland
- Voivodeship: Greater Poland
- County: Czarnków-Trzcianka
- Gmina: Krzyż Wielkopolski

Żelichowo ([ʐɛliˈxɔvɔ]; German: Selchow) is a village in the administrative district of Gmina Krzyż Wielkopolski, within Czarnków-Trzcianka County, Greater Poland Voivodeship, in west-central Poland.
