= Stobno, Czarnków-Trzcianka County =

Stobno
- Village
- Location within Poland
- Coordinates: 53°5′23″N 16°37′46″E
- Country: Poland
- Voivodeship: Greater Poland
- County: Czarnków-Trzcianka
- Gmina: Trzcianka
- Population: 540

Stobno ([ˈstɔbnɔ]; German: Stöwen) is a village in the administrative district of Gmina Trzcianka, within Czarnków-Trzcianka County, Greater Poland Voivodeship, in northwestern Poland.
