= Marianowo, Czarnków-Trzcianka County =

Marianowo
- Village
- Location within Poland
- Coordinates: 52°54′00″N 16°08′11″E
- Country: Poland
- Voivodeship: Greater Poland
- County: Czarnków-Trzcianka
- Gmina: Wieleń

Marianowo [marjaˈnɔvɔ]) is a village in the administrative district of Gmina Wieleń, within Czarnków-Trzcianka County, Greater Poland Voivodeship, in west-central Poland.
