= Wizany =

- Village
- Location within Poland
- Coordinates: 52°56′N 16°6′E
- Country: Poland
- Voivodeship: Greater Poland
- County: Czarnków-Trzcianka
- Gmina: Krzyż Wielkopolski

Wizany ([viˈzanɨ]; German: Fissahn) is a village in the administrative district of Gmina Krzyż Wielkopolski, within Czarnków-Trzcianka County, Greater Poland Voivodeship, in west-central Poland.
