= Bzowo =

Bzowo may refer to the following places:

- Bzowo, Greater Poland Voivodeship (west-central Poland)
- Bzowo, Kuyavian-Pomeranian Voivodeship (north-central Poland)
- Bzowo, Pomeranian Voivodeship (north Poland)
