= Folsztyn =

- Village
- Location within Poland
- Coordinates: 52°54′N 16°16′E
- Country: Poland
- Voivodeship: Greater Poland
- County: Czarnków-Trzcianka
- Gmina: Wieleń

Folsztyn [ˈfɔlʂtɨn] is a village in the administrative district of Gmina Wieleń, within Czarnków-Trzcianka County, Greater Poland Voivodeship, in west-central Poland.
