= Dzierżążno Małe =

- Village
- Location within Poland
- Coordinates: 53°01′32″N 16°13′56″E
- Country: Poland
- Voivodeship: Greater Poland
- County: Czarnków-Trzcianka
- Gmina: Wieleń
- Population: 160

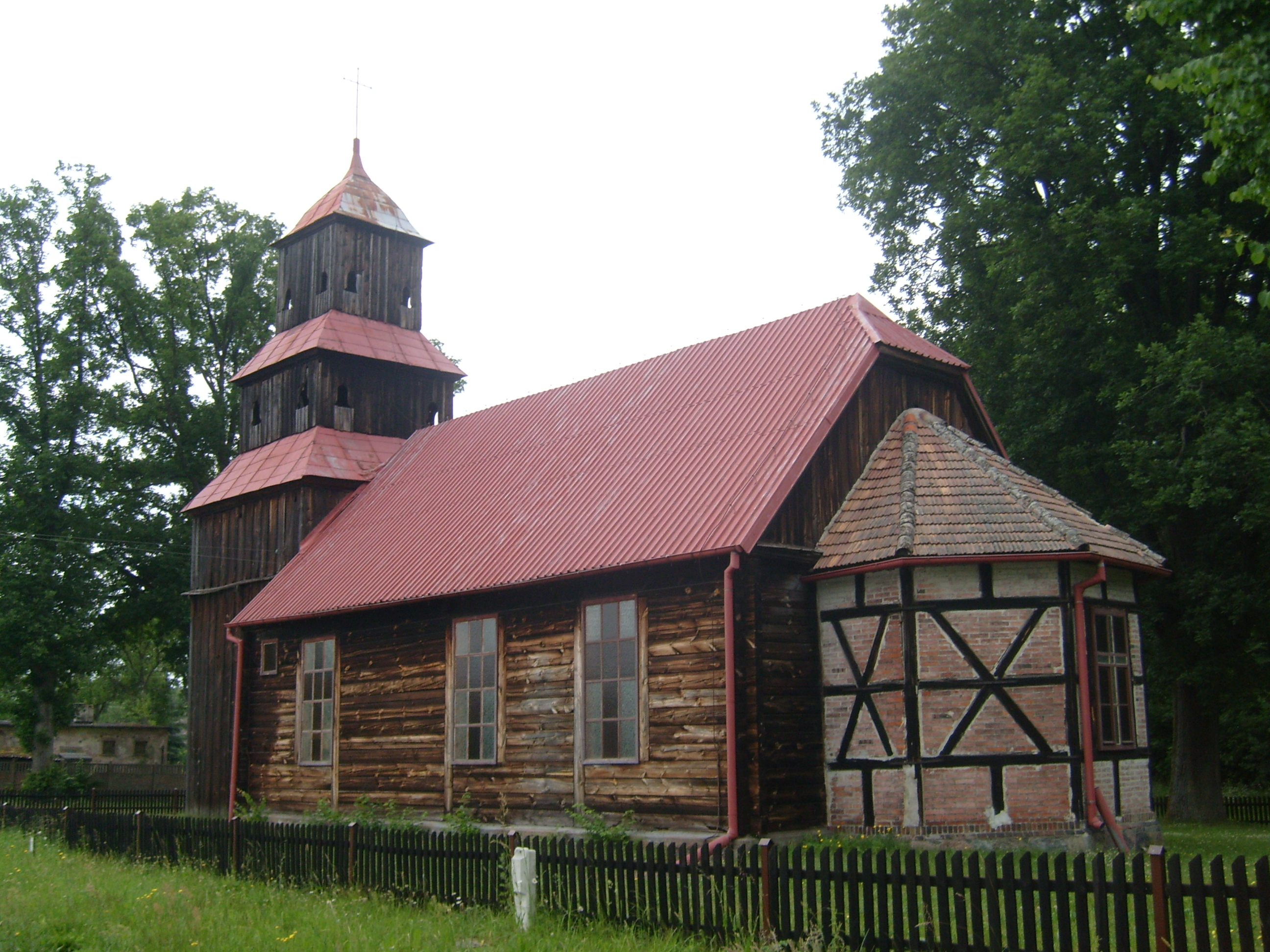
Most Sacred Heart of Jesus, a church in the village

Dzierżążno Małe [d͡ʑɛrˈʐɔ̃ʐnɔ ˈmawɛ] is a village in the administrative district of Gmina Wieleń, within Czarnków-Trzcianka County, Greater Poland Voivodeship, in west-central Poland.
