= Biernatowo =

- Village
- Location within Poland
- Coordinates: 52°57′20″N 16°17′48″E
- Country: Poland
- Voivodeship: Greater Poland
- County: Czarnków-Trzcianka
- Gmina: Trzcianka

Biernatowo ([bjɛrnaˈtɔvɔ]; German: Ascherbude) is a village in the administrative district of Gmina Trzcianka, within Czarnków-Trzcianka County, Greater Poland Voivodeship, in west-central Poland.
