= Górnica, Greater Poland Voivodeship =

Górnica
- Village
- Location within Poland
- Coordinates: 52°59′N 16°19′E
- Country: Poland
- Voivodeship: Greater Poland
- County: Czarnków-Trzcianka
- Gmina: Trzcianka

Górnica ([ɡurˈnit͡sa]; German: Gornitz) is a village in the administrative district of Gmina Trzcianka, in Czarnków-Trzcianka County, Greater Poland Voivodeship, in west-central Poland.
