= Stradun =

Stradun may refer to:

- Stradun (street), the main street in Dubrovnik, Croatia
- Straduń, a village in Poland
