= Sławno (disambiguation) =

Sławno is a town in West Pomeranian Voivodeship (north-west Poland).

Sławno may also refer to:

- Sławno, Kuyavian-Pomeranian Voivodeship (north-central Poland)
- Sławno, Podlaskie Voivodeship (north-east Poland)
- Sławno, Łódź Voivodeship (central Poland)
- Sławno, Masovian Voivodeship (east-central Poland)
- Sławno, Czarnków-Trzcianka County in Greater Poland Voivodeship (west-central Poland)
- Sławno, Gniezno County in Greater Poland Voivodeship (west-central Poland)
- Sławno, Lubusz Voivodeship (west Poland)
- Sławno, Szczecinek County in West Pomeranian Voivodeship (north-west Poland)
