= Niekursko =

- Village
- Location within Poland
- Coordinates: 53°06′46″N 16°23′45″E
- Country: Poland
- Voivodeship: Greater Poland
- County: Czarnków-Trzcianka
- Gmina: Trzcianka
- Population: 387

Niekursko ([ɲɛˈkurskɔ]; German: Niekosken) is a village in the administrative district of Gmina Trzcianka, within Czarnków-Trzcianka County, Greater Poland Voivodeship, in west-central Poland.
