= Przyłęki =

Przyłęki may refer to the following places:

- Przyłęki, Greater Poland Voivodeship (west-central Poland)
- Przyłęki, Kuyavian-Pomeranian Voivodeship (north-central Poland)
- Przyłęki, West Pomeranian Voivodeship (north-west Poland)
