= Rychlik, Greater Poland Voivodeship =

Rychlik
- Village
- Location within Poland
- Coordinates: 53°00′08″N 16°20′18″E
- Country: Poland
- Voivodeship: Greater Poland
- County: Czarnków-Trzcianka
- Gmina: Trzcianka

Rychlik [ˈrɨxlik] (German: Karolina) is a village in the administrative district of Gmina Trzcianka, within Czarnków-Trzcianka County, Greater Poland Voivodeship, in west-central Poland.
