= Młynkowo =

Młynkowo may refer to the following places:

- Młynkowo, Czarnków-Trzcianka County in Greater Poland Voivodeship (west-central Poland)
- Młynkowo, Szamotuły County in Greater Poland Voivodeship (west-central Poland)
- Młynkowo, Lubusz Voivodeship (west Poland)
