= Lubcz Mały =

- Village
- Location within Poland
- Coordinates: 52°54′N 16°4′E
- Country: Poland
- Voivodeship: Greater Poland
- County: Czarnków-Trzcianka
- Gmina: Krzyż Wielkopolski

Lubcz Mały ([ˈlupt͡ʂ ˈmawɨ]; German: Klein Lubs) is a village in the administrative district of Gmina Krzyż Wielkopolski, within Czarnków-Trzcianka County, Greater Poland Voivodeship, in west-central Poland.
