= Ginterowo =

- Settlement
- Location within Poland
- Coordinates: 53°1′37″N 16°23′15″E
- Country: Poland
- Voivodeship: Greater Poland
- County: Czarnków-Trzcianka
- Gmina: Trzcianka

Ginterowo ([ɡintɛˈrɔvɔ]; German: Günterhof) is a settlement in the administrative district of Gmina Trzcianka, within Czarnków-Trzcianka County, Greater Poland Voivodeship, in west-central Poland.
