= Kamiennik, Greater Poland Voivodeship =

Kamiennik
- Village
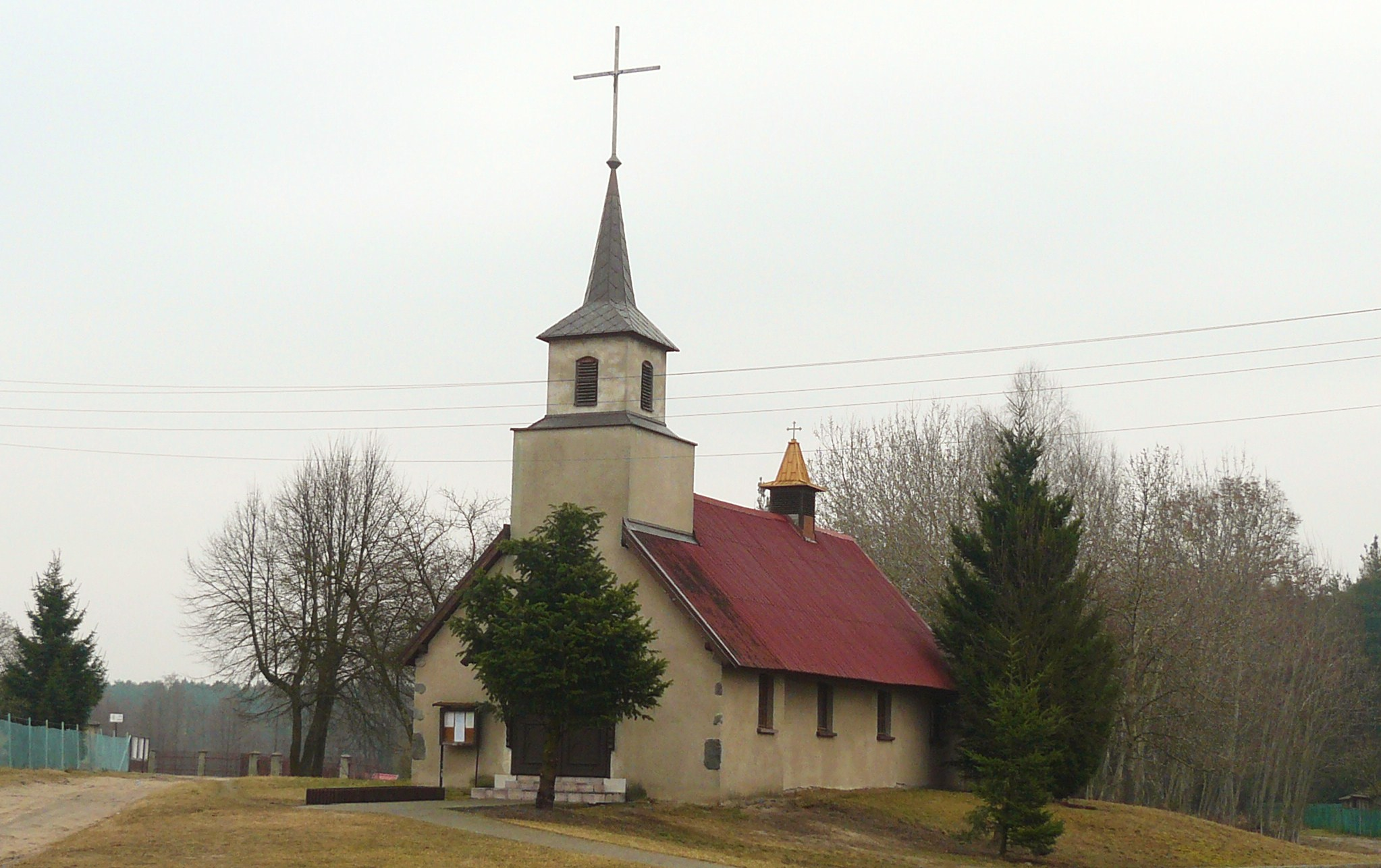
- Church in Kamiennik

- Location within Poland
- Coordinates: 52°48′32″N 15°58′23″E
- Country: Poland
- Voivodeship: Greater Poland
- County: Czarnków-Trzcianka
- Gmina: Drawsko

Kamiennik (Polish pronunciation: [kaˈmjɛɲːik]; German: Kaminchen) is a village in the administrative district of Gmina Drawsko, within Czarnków-Trzcianka County, Greater Poland Voivodeship, in west-central Poland.
