= Radolin, Greater Poland Voivodeship =

Radolin
- Village
- Location within Poland
- Coordinates: 53°0′N 16°32′E
- Country: Poland
- Voivodeship: Greater Poland
- County: Czarnków-Trzcianka
- Gmina: Trzcianka

Radolin [raˈdɔlin] is a village in the administrative district of Gmina Trzcianka, within Czarnków-Trzcianka County, Greater Poland Voivodeship, in west-central Poland.
