= Kępa, Czarnków-Trzcianka County =

Kępa
- Village
- Location within Poland
- Coordinates: 53°7′N 16°32′E
- Country: Poland
- Voivodeship: Greater Poland
- County: Czarnków-Trzcianka
- Gmina: Trzcianka

Kępa [ˈkɛmpa] (German: Kappe) is a village in the administrative district of Gmina Trzcianka, in Czarnków-Trzcianka County, Greater Poland Voivodeship, in west-central Poland.
