= Boruszyn =

Boruszyn refers to the following places in Poland:

- Boruszyn, Greater Poland Voivodeship
- Boruszyn, Lubusz Voivodeship
