= Kawczyn, Czarnków-Trzcianka County =

Kawczyn
- Village
- Location within Poland
- Coordinates: 52°48′32″N 15°58′23″E
- Country: Poland
- Voivodeship: Greater Poland
- County: Czarnków-Trzcianka
- Gmina: Drawsko

Kawczyn [ˈkaft͡ʂɨn] (German: Neu Erbach) is a village in the administrative district of Gmina Drawsko, within Czarnków-Trzcianka County, Greater Poland Voivodeship, in west-central Poland.
