= Herburtowo =

- Village
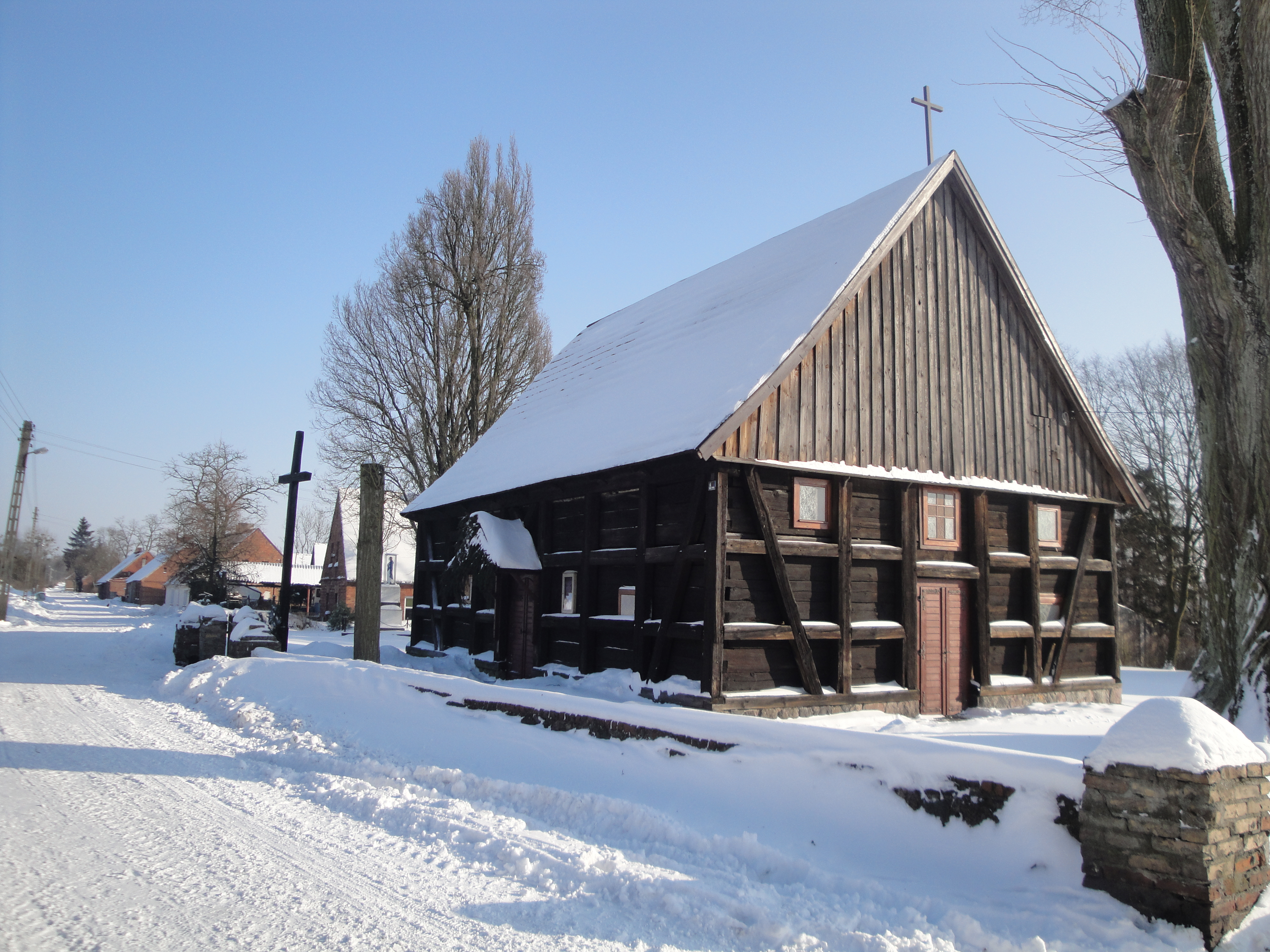

- Location within Poland
- Coordinates: 52°53′55″N 16°06′40″E
- Country: Poland
- Voivodeship: Greater Poland
- County: Czarnków-Trzcianka
- Gmina: Wieleń

Herburtowo [xɛrburˈtɔvɔ] is a village in the administrative district of Gmina Wieleń, within Czarnków-Trzcianka County, Greater Poland Voivodeship, in west-central Poland.
