= Brzegi, Greater Poland Voivodeship =

Brzegi
- Village
- Location within Poland
- Coordinates: 52°54′11″N 16°1′52″E
- Country: Poland
- Voivodeship: Greater Poland
- County: Czarnków-Trzcianka
- Gmina: Krzyż Wielkopolski
- Population: 170

Brzegi ([ˈbʐɛɡi]; German: Kienwerder) is a village in the administrative district of Gmina Krzyż Wielkopolski, within Czarnków-Trzcianka County, Greater Poland Voivodeship, in west-central Poland.
