= Tarnówko =

Tarnówko may refer to the following places:

- Tarnówko, Greater Poland Voivodeship (west-central Poland)
- Tarnówko, Kuyavian-Pomeranian Voivodeship (north-central Poland)
- Tarnówko, West Pomeranian Voivodeship (north-west Poland)
