= Łomnica Pierwsza =

- Settlement
- Location within Poland
- Coordinates: 53°04′40″N 16°32′47″E
- Country: Poland
- Voivodeship: Greater Poland
- County: Czarnków-Trzcianka
- Gmina: Trzcianka

Łomnica Pierwsza [wɔmˈnit͡sa ˈpjɛrfʂa] is a settlement in the administrative district of Gmina Trzcianka, within Czarnków-Trzcianka County, Greater Poland Voivodeship, in west-central Poland.
