= Kwiejce =

- Village
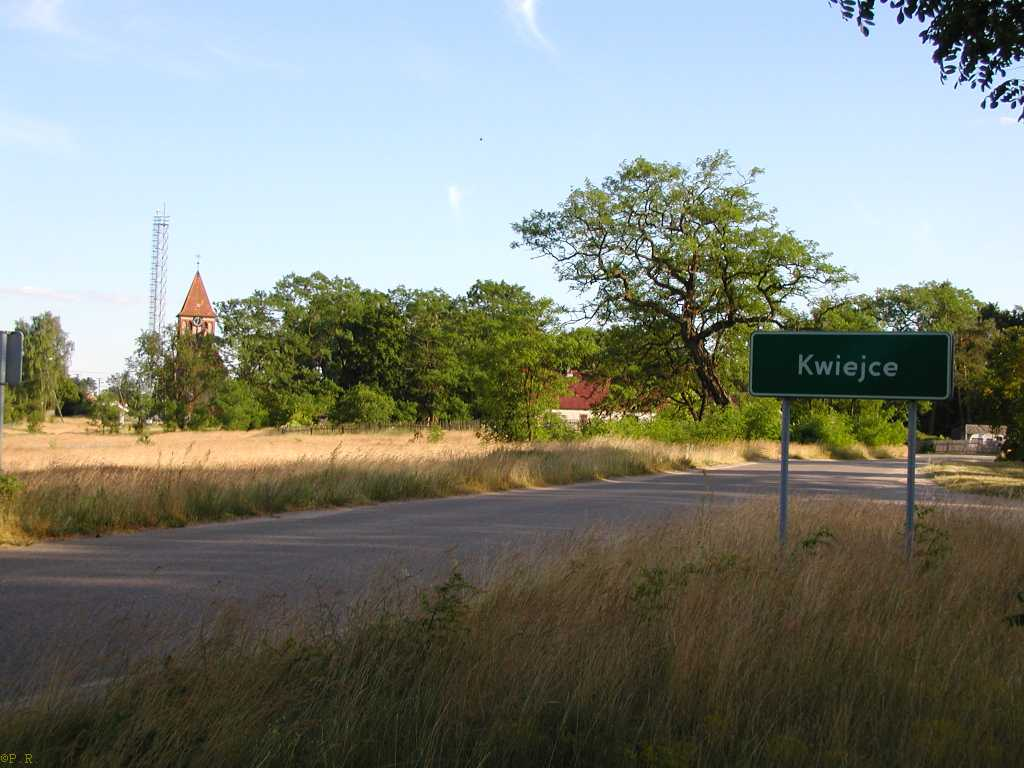
- Road sign in Kwiejce

- Location within Poland
- Coordinates: 52°46′N 15°57′E
- Country: Poland
- Voivodeship: Greater Poland
- County: Czarnków-Trzcianka
- Gmina: Drawsko
- Website: http://www.kwiejce.com

Kwiejce [ˈkfjɛi̯t͡sɛ] (German: Altsorge) is a village in the administrative district of Gmina Drawsko, within Czarnków-Trzcianka County, Greater Poland Voivodeship, in west-central Poland.
