= Vampire burial =

Burial actions to prevent vampires from rising

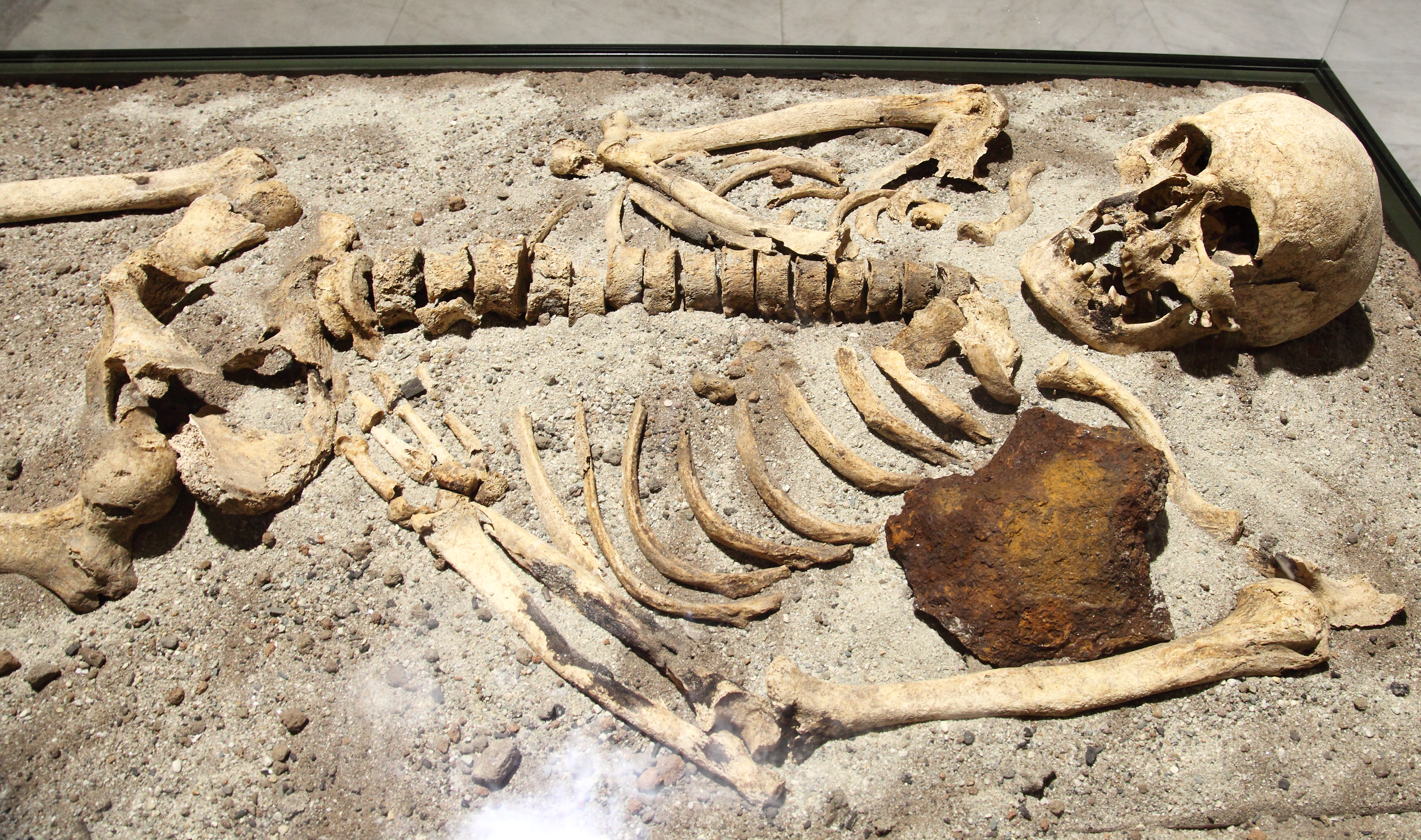
A 14th century vampire burial in Sozopol, Bulgaria, preserved in the country's National Museum of Natural History. The deceased had been buried with a ploughshare driven through his chest.

A vampire burial or anti-vampire burial is a burial performed in a way which was believed to prevent the deceased from reviving in the form of a vampire, or to prevent a killed vampire from returning to life. Methods of anti-vampiric burials varied greatly, but often involved dismembering the body in some way or placing rocks over it.

Belief in vampires (upiórs) was common in Slavic countries, and many such burials have been found in Poland.

== Traditions and rituals ==
Traditions, known from the medieval times, varied greatly. According to folklore beliefs, vampires were obsessed with counting, so one method of dealing with them was to place a poppy in the vampire's grave, meaning that they would not be able to leave before counting the seeds. Another approach was to place iron objects or coins into the mouth of the deceased.

A common method of burial for a person suspected of being a vampire was to cut off their head and place it out of their reach - most frequently between the legs. Sometimes the head would be placed above the corpse or under its armpit. Some believed that if a vampire was unable to find their detached head they would be harmless.

Another burial method involved piercing the body of the deceased with a rod or other sharp implement. Other burial strategies involved covering the body with rocks to prevent the deceased from leaving their grave, placing sickles across the neck so that if the body rose as a vampire its head would be cut off, covering the lower half of the body with a sticky gypsum-like substance, cutting tendons to impede the vampire's movement should it awake, or burying the body face down so that it would dig down, rather than up, when awaking from the dead.

Some burials involved piercing the heart of the corpse with an aspen stake. How widespread this method was is uncertain, because wood decays, but one such burial has been found in Poland.

== Examples ==
Archeologists have uncovered a number of burials believed to be of this type:

- A mid-16th century burial of a woman on the island of Lazzaretto Nuovo in the Venice lagoon, Italy
- Some interments in a cemetery in Greater Poland, dated 1675–1880.
- Burials in Drawsko cemetery, Poland, dated to the 17th-18th centuries However the theory about "vampire burials" there has been contested later.
- Gliwice, Poland, undated
- Medieval cemetery site in Kałdus, Poland
- A 17th-century burial of a woman in a graveyard in Pień, Poland. The corpse had a padlock around the toe and a scythe positioned in such a way that if the corpse had risen from the grave, the scythe would have severed its throat.
- Anti-vampire burial from Sanok

The term "vampire burial" has also been applied to burials associated with other beliefs about the dead returning, or spirits rising from graves. The 5th century "Children's Necropolis" in Lugnano in Teverina, Italy, has examples of such burials, including one child interred with a rock placed in their mouth after death, and another with stones weighing down her hands and feet.

== See also ==
- Maschalismos
