= Gmina Lubasz =

Gmina Lubasz Lubasz Commune
- Gmina
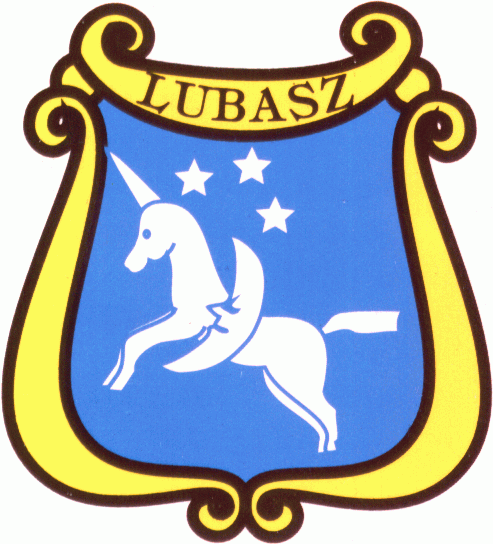
- Coat of arms
- Interactive map of Gmina Lubasz
- Coordinates (Lubasz): 52°51′N 16°31′E
- Country: Poland
- Voivodeship: Greater Poland
- County: Czarnków-Trzcianka
- Seat: Lubasz

Area
  - Total: 167.58 km^{2} (64.70 sq mi)

Population (2006)
  - Total: 6,992
  - Density: 41.72/km^{2} (108.1/sq mi)

Gmina Lubasz is a rural gmina (administrative district) in Czarnków-Trzcianka County, Greater Poland Voivodeship, in west-central Poland. Its seat is the village of Lubasz, which lies approximately 7 kilometres (4 mi) south-west of Czarnków and 57 km (35 mi) north-west of the regional capital Poznań.

The gmina covers an area of 167.58 square kilometres (64.7 sq mi), and as of 2006 its total population is 6,992.

== Villages ==
Gmina Lubasz contains the villages and settlements of Antoniewo, Bończa, Bzowo, Dębe, Elżbiecin, Goraj, Jędrzejewo, Kamionka, Klempicz, Krucz, Kruteczek, Lubasz, Miłkówko, Miłkowo, Nowina, Prusinowo, Sławno, Sokołowo and Stajkowo.

== Neighbouring gminas ==
Gmina Lubasz is bordered by the town of Czarnków and by the gminas of Czarnków, Obrzycko, Połajewo, Wieleń and Wronki.
