= Zielonowo, Greater Poland Voivodeship =

Zielonowo
- Village
- Location within Poland
- Coordinates: 52°55′N 16°19′E
- Country: Poland
- Voivodeship: Greater Poland
- County: Czarnków-Trzcianka
- Gmina: Wieleń
- Population: 231

Zielonowo [ʑɛlɔˈnɔvɔ] is a village in the administrative district of Gmina Wieleń, within Czarnków-Trzcianka County, Greater Poland Voivodeship, in west-central Poland.

== Notable residents ==
- Friedrich Wilhelm Kritzinger (1890 - 1947), civil servant, participant of the Wannsee Conference
