= Smolary, Czarnków-Trzcianka County =

Smolary
- Village
- Location within Poland
- Coordinates: 53°2′34″N 16°21′37″E
- Country: Poland
- Voivodeship: Greater Poland
- County: Czarnków-Trzcianka
- Gmina: Trzcianka

Smolary [smɔˈlarɨ] is a village in the administrative district of Gmina Trzcianka, within Czarnków-Trzcianka County, Greater Poland Voivodeship, in west-central Poland.
