= Gmina Połajewo =

Gmina Połajewo Połajewo Commune
- Gmina
- Flag Coat of arms
- Interactive map of Gmina Połajewo
- Coordinates (Połajewo): 52°47′48″N 16°44′21″E
- Country: Poland
- Voivodeship: Greater Poland
- County: Czarnków-Trzcianka
- Seat: Połajewo

Area
  - Total: 141.97 km^{2} (54.81 sq mi)

Population (2006)
  - Total: 6,140
  - Density: 43.2/km^{2} (112/sq mi)
- Website: http://www.polajewo.bazagmin.pl/

Gmina Połajewo is a rural gmina (administrative district) in Czarnków-Trzcianka County, Greater Poland Voivodeship, in west-central Poland. Its seat is the village of Połajewo, which lies approximately 17 kilometres (11 mi) south-east of Czarnków and 46 km (29 mi) north of the regional capital Poznań.

The gmina covers an area of 141.97 square kilometres (54.8 sq mi), and as of 2006 its total population is 6,140.

== Villages ==
Gmina Połajewo contains the villages and settlements of Boruszyn, Krosin, Krosinek, Młynkowo, Połajewo, Przybychowo, Sierakówko and Tarnówko.

== Neighbouring gminas ==
Gmina Połajewo is bordered by the gminas of Czarnków, Lubasz, Oborniki, Obrzycko and Ryczywół.

== Bibliography ==
- Polish official population figures 2006
