= Pokrzywno, Greater Poland Voivodeship =

Pokrzywno
- Village
- Location within Poland
- Coordinates: 53°6′57″N 16°32′20″E
- Country: Poland
- Voivodeship: Greater Poland
- County: Czarnków-Trzcianka
- Gmina: Trzcianka
- Population: 220

Pokrzywno ([pɔˈkʂɨvnɔ]; German: Krumfließerhütte) is a village in the administrative district of Gmina Trzcianka, within Czarnków-Trzcianka County, Greater Poland Voivodeship, in west-central Poland.
