= Moczydła, Czarnków-Trzcianka County =

Moczydła
- Village
- Location within Poland
- Coordinates: 52°50′09″N 15°57′44″E
- Country: Poland
- Voivodeship: Greater Poland
- County: Czarnków-Trzcianka
- Gmina: Drawsko

Moczydła [mɔˈt͡ʂɨdwa] (German: Erbenswunsch) is a village in the administrative district of Gmina Drawsko, within Czarnków-Trzcianka County, Greater Poland Voivodeship, in west-central Poland.
