= Biała, Gmina Trzcianka =

Biała
- Village
- Location within Poland
- Coordinates: 53°2′44″N 16°32′23″E
- Country: Poland
- Voivodeship: Greater Poland
- County: Czarnków-Trzcianka
- Gmina: Trzcianka
- Population: 1,000
- Website: http://www.biala_trzcianka.republika.pl/

Biała ([ˈbjawa]; German: Behle) is a village in the administrative district of Gmina Trzcianka, within Czarnków-Trzcianka County, Greater Poland Voivodeship, in west-central Poland.
