= Bzowo, Greater Poland Voivodeship =

Bzowo
- Village
- Location within Poland
- Coordinates: 52°51′15″N 16°28′36″E
- Country: Poland
- Voivodeship: Greater Poland
- County: Czarnków-Trzcianka
- Gmina: Lubasz
- Population: 120

Bzowo [ˈbzɔvɔ] is a village in the administrative district of Gmina Lubasz, within Czarnków-Trzcianka County, Greater Poland Voivodeship, in west-central Poland.
