= Bończa, Greater Poland Voivodeship =

Bończa
- Village
- Location within Poland
- Coordinates: 52°49′47″N 16°31′46″E
- Country: Poland
- Voivodeship: Greater Poland
- County: Czarnków-Trzcianka
- Gmina: Lubasz
- Population: 70

Bończa [ˈbɔɲt͡ʂa] is a village in the administrative district of Gmina Lubasz, within Czarnków-Trzcianka County, Greater Poland Voivodeship, in west-central Poland.
