= Prusinowo, Czarnków-Trzcianka County =

Prusinowo
- Village
- Location within Poland
- Coordinates: 52°51′N 16°35′E
- Country: Poland
- Voivodeship: Greater Poland
- County: Czarnków-Trzcianka
- Gmina: Lubasz

Prusinowo [pruɕiˈnɔvɔ] is a village in the administrative district of Gmina Lubasz, within Czarnków-Trzcianka County, Greater Poland Voivodeship, in west-central Poland.
