= Karcze, Greater Poland Voivodeship =

Karcze
- Village
- Location within Poland
- Coordinates: 52°58′26″N 16°15′46″E
- Country: Poland
- Voivodeship: Greater Poland
- County: Czarnków-Trzcianka
- Gmina: Trzcianka

Karcze [ˈkart͡ʂɛ] is a village in the administrative district of Gmina Trzcianka, within Czarnków-Trzcianka County, Greater Poland Voivodeship, in west-central Poland.
