= Gmina Drawsko =

Gmina Drawsko Drawsko Commune
- Gmina
- Coat of arms
- Interactive map of Gmina Drawsko
- Coordinates (Drawsko): 52°51′N 16°2′E
- Country: Poland
- Voivodeship: Greater Poland
- County: Czarnków-Trzcianka
- Seat: Drawsko

Area
  - Total: 162.95 km^{2} (62.92 sq mi)

Population (2024)
  - Total: 5,510
  - Density: 33.8/km^{2} (87.6/sq mi)
- Website: www.gminadrawsko.pl

Gmina Drawsko is a rural gmina (administrative district) in Czarnków-Trzcianka County, Greater Poland Voivodeship, in west-central Poland. Its seat is the village of Drawsko, which lies approximately 37 kilometres (23 mi) west of Czarnków and 78 km (48 mi) north-west of the regional capital Poznań.

The gmina covers an area of 162.95 square kilometres (62.9 sq mi), and as of 2006 its total population is 5,914.

== Villages ==
Gmina Drawsko contains the villages and settlements of Chełst, Drawski Młyn, Drawsko, Kamiennik, Kawczyn, Kwiejce, Marylin, Moczydła, Nowe Kwiejce, Pęckowo, Pełcza and Piłka.

== Neighbouring gminas ==
Gmina Drawsko is bordered by the gminas of Drezdenko, Krzyż Wielkopolski, Sieraków, Wieleń and Wronki.
