= Kochanówka, Greater Poland Voivodeship =

Kochanówka
- Settlement
- Location within Poland
- Coordinates: 53°3′58″N 16°28′53″E
- Country: Poland
- Voivodeship: Greater Poland
- County: Czarnków-Trzcianka
- Gmina: Trzcianka

Kochanówka [kɔxaˈnufka] is a settlement in the administrative district of Gmina Trzcianka, within Czarnków-Trzcianka County, Greater Poland Voivodeship, in west-central Poland.
