= Boruszyn, Greater Poland Voivodeship =

Boruszyn
- Village
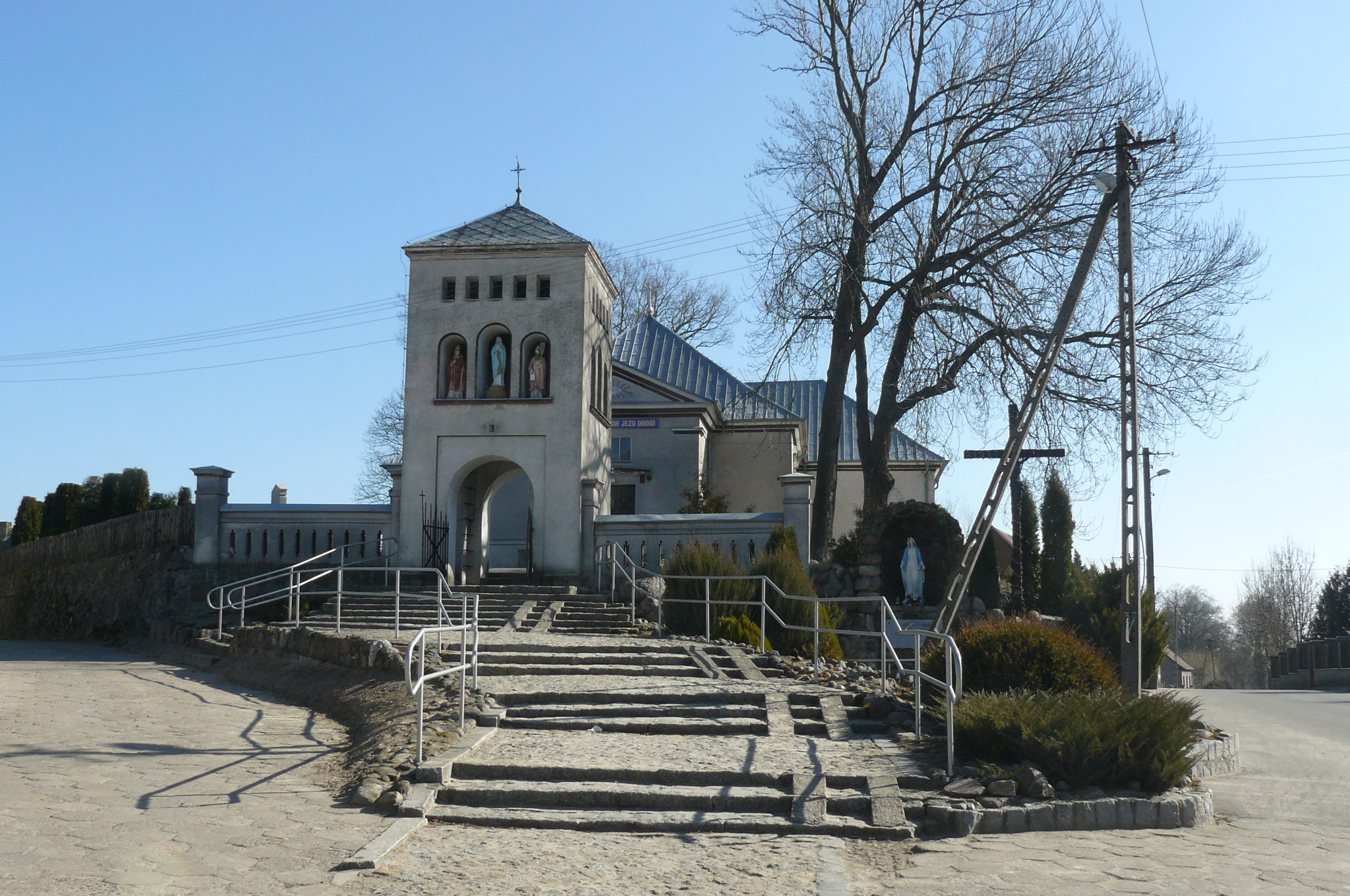
- Church of Saint Andrew

- Location within Poland
- Coordinates: 52°47′N 16°38′E
- Country: Poland
- Voivodeship: Greater Poland
- County: Czarnków-Trzcianka
- Gmina: Połajewo

Boruszyn [bɔˈruʂɨn] (German: Boruschin) is a village in the administrative district of Gmina Połajewo, within Czarnków-Trzcianka County, Greater Poland Voivodeship, in west-central Poland.
