= Anti-vampire burial in Sanok =

Burial site in Poland

An apparent anti-vampire burial was discovered in Sanok, a city in southern Poland, in 1986. After two years of excavation, the remains of forty men were discovered, most of them partially destroyed.

== History ==
This burial was discovered in 1986 during a house demolition in Sanok. It was one of forty burials discovered at this archaeological site. The excavations began in 1987 and ended in 1988.

A partially-destroyed grave (later numbered burial number 3a) was found in 1987. It contained the remains of a person who had died before reaching 25 years old. No burial goods or wooden structures were found. The skeleton was incomplete, missing some leg bones and right hand bones. The skull was found between the femurs. The sex could not be determined, because the skeleton had female as well as male sexual characteristics. The burial was dated based on another part of the site from where some medieval pottery and modern coins had been found. The original hypothesis that the remains were an executioner from Sanok was not supported by the relatively modest size of the skeleton.

== Anti-vampire burials ==
Anti-vampire burials are characterized by incomplete skeletons, lack of goods and skull missing or located between legs. This type of burial was given people who did not belong to the society. Anti-vampire practices aimed to protect the living from a dangerous dead person.

== Sources ==
- Kotowicz, P. (2011). "Wampir". Rocznik Sanocki. X: 33–65.
- Matczak, Magdalena (2014). "Tak zwane pochówki antywampiryczne a zagadnienie zmian patologicznych. Próba reinterpretacji". In Dzieduszycki Wojciech; Wrzesiński Jacek (eds.). Funeralia Lednickie spotkanie 16. Królowie i biskupi, rycerze i chłopi – identyfikacja zmarłych. Poznań: Stowarzyszenie Naukowe Archeologów Polskich. pp. 437–457.
- Matczak, Magdalena; Kozłowski, Tomasz; Chudziak, Wojciech (2021). "A multidisciplinary study of anti-vampire burials from early medieval Culmen, Poland: were the diseased and disabled regarded as vampires?". Archaeologia Historica Polona. 29: 219–252. doi:10.12775/AHP.2021.012. ISSN 1425-3534.
- Żydok, Przemysław (2004), "Wczesnośredniowieczne pochówki antywampiryczne", Hereditatem cognoscere. Studia i szkice dedykowane Profesor Marii Miśkiewicz, Warszawa: Letter Quality, pp. 38–66
