= Byala =

Byala may refer to:

- Byala, Varna Province, a town in Varna Province in northeastern Bulgaria
- Byala, Ruse Province, a town in Ruse Province in northern Bulgaria
- Byala, Sliven Province, a village in Sliven Municipality in southeastern Bulgaria
- Nawarupa - a mythical creature in Burmese and Arakanese mythology

== See also ==
- Biala (disambiguation)
