= Biała, Gmina Wieleń =

Biała
- Village
- Location within Poland
- Coordinates: 52°49′45″N 16°18′35″E
- Country: Poland
- Voivodeship: Greater Poland
- County: Czarnków-Trzcianka
- Gmina: Wieleń
- Population: 210

Biała [ˈbjawa] is a village in the administrative district of Gmina Wieleń, within Czarnków-Trzcianka County, Greater Poland Voivodeship, in west-central Poland.
