= Gmina Trzcianka =

Gmina Trzcianka Trzcianka Commune
- Gmina
- Flag Coat of arms
- Interactive map of Gmina Trzcianka
- Coordinates (Trzcianka): 53°3′N 16°28′E
- Country: Poland
- Voivodeship: Greater Poland
- County: Czarnków-Trzcianka
- Seat: Trzcianka

Area
  - Total: 375.33 km^{2} (144.92 sq mi)

Population (2006)
  - Total: 23,482
  - Density: 62.564/km^{2} (162.04/sq mi)
  - Urban: 16,756
  - Rural: 6,726
- Website: http://www.trzcianka.pl

Gmina Trzcianka is an urban-rural gmina (administrative district) in Czarnków-Trzcianka County, Greater Poland Voivodeship, in west-central Poland. Its seat is the town of Trzcianka, which lies approximately 18 kilometres (11 mi) north of Czarnków and 79 km (49 mi) north-west of the regional capital Poznań.

The gmina covers an area of 375.33 square kilometres (144.9 sq mi), and as of 2006 its total population is 23,482 (out of which the population of Trzcianka amounts to 16,756, and the population of the rural part of the gmina is 6,726).

== Villages ==
Apart from the town of Trzcianka, Gmina Trzcianka contains the villages and settlements of Biała, Biernatowo, Dłużewo, Ginterowo, Górnica, Kadłubek, Karcze, Kępa, Kochanówka, Łomnica, Łomnica Druga, Łomnica Pierwsza, Łomnica-Folwark, Łomnica-Młyn, Niekursko, Nowa Wieś, Ogorzałe, Osiniec, Pańska Łaska, Pokrzywno, Przyłęki, Radolin, Rudka, Runowo, Rychlik, Sarcz, Siedlisko, Smolarnia, Smolary, Stobno, Straduń, Teresin, Teresin-Karczma, Wapniarnia Pierwsza, Wapniarnia Trzecia and Wrząca.

== Neighbouring gminas ==
Gmina Trzcianka is bordered by the gminas of Czarnków, Człopa, Szydłowo, Ujście, Wałcz and Wieleń.
