= Huta Szklana, Greater Poland Voivodeship =

Huta Szklana
- Village
- Location within Poland
- Coordinates: 52°55′N 16°3′E
- Country: Poland
- Voivodeship: Greater Poland
- County: Czarnków-Trzcianka
- Gmina: Krzyż Wielkopolski

Huta Szklana ([ˈxuta ˈʂklana]; German: Glashütte) is a village in the administrative district of Gmina Krzyż Wielkopolski, within Czarnków-Trzcianka County, Greater Poland Voivodeship, in west-central Poland.
