= Maschalismos =

Preventing the undead from rising

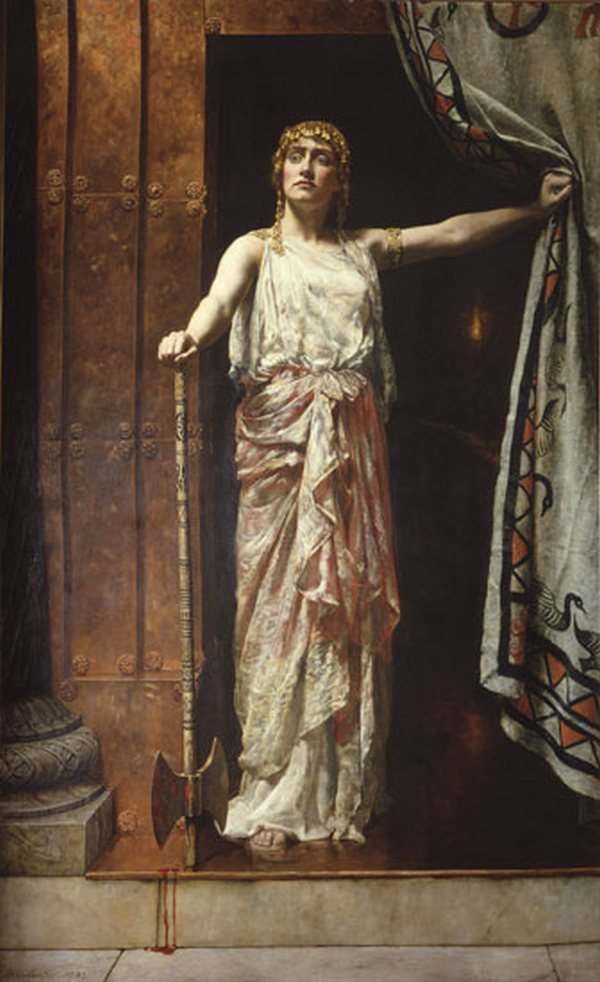
Clytemnestra performed maschalismos on the body of Agamemnon after she killed him

Maschalismos (Ancient Greek: μασχαλισμός) is the practice of physically rendering the dead incapable of rising or haunting the living in undead form. It comes from the Ancient Greek word and was also the term for procedural rules on such matters in later Greek customary law.

Such acts considered maschalismos were not limited to folkloric physical risings but also meant to escape the ill will of those wrongfully slain by a murderer after death. Sophocles expresses that such treatment is saved for one's 'enemies' due to the act being a way to elicit indignation as well as dishonor the dead.

In Aeschylus' tragedy Choephori and Sophocles' tragedy Electra, Clytemnestra performs maschalismos on the body of Agamemnon after his murder, to prevent him from taking vengeance on her. In the Argonautica of Apollonius of Rhodes, Jason performs maschalismos on the body of Medea's brother Apsyrtus after treacherously murdering him; in addition to cutting off the extremities, Jason licks the dead man's blood three times and spits it out three times. "The scholiast says that the blood was spat into the mouth of the deceased", according to a footnote in the Loeb edition.

== See also ==
- Vampire burial
