= Jędrzejewo, Gmina Lubasz =

Jędrzejewo
- Village
- Location within Poland
- Coordinates: 52°50′N 16°36′E
- Country: Poland
- Voivodeship: Greater Poland
- County: Czarnków-Trzcianka
- Gmina: Lubasz
- Population: 900

Jędrzejewo [jɛndʐɛˈjɛvɔ] is a village in the administrative district of Gmina Lubasz, within Czarnków-Trzcianka County, Greater Poland Voivodeship, in west-central Poland.
