= Dębogóra, Czarnków-Trzcianka County =

Dębogóra
- Village
- Location within Poland
- Coordinates: 52°58′27″N 16°7′33″E
- Country: Poland
- Voivodeship: Greater Poland
- County: Czarnków-Trzcianka
- Gmina: Wieleń
- Population: 290

Dębogóra [dɛmbɔˈɡura] is a village in the administrative district of Gmina Wieleń, within Czarnków-Trzcianka County, Greater Poland Voivodeship, in west-central Poland.
