= Chełst, Greater Poland Voivodeship =

Chełst
- Village
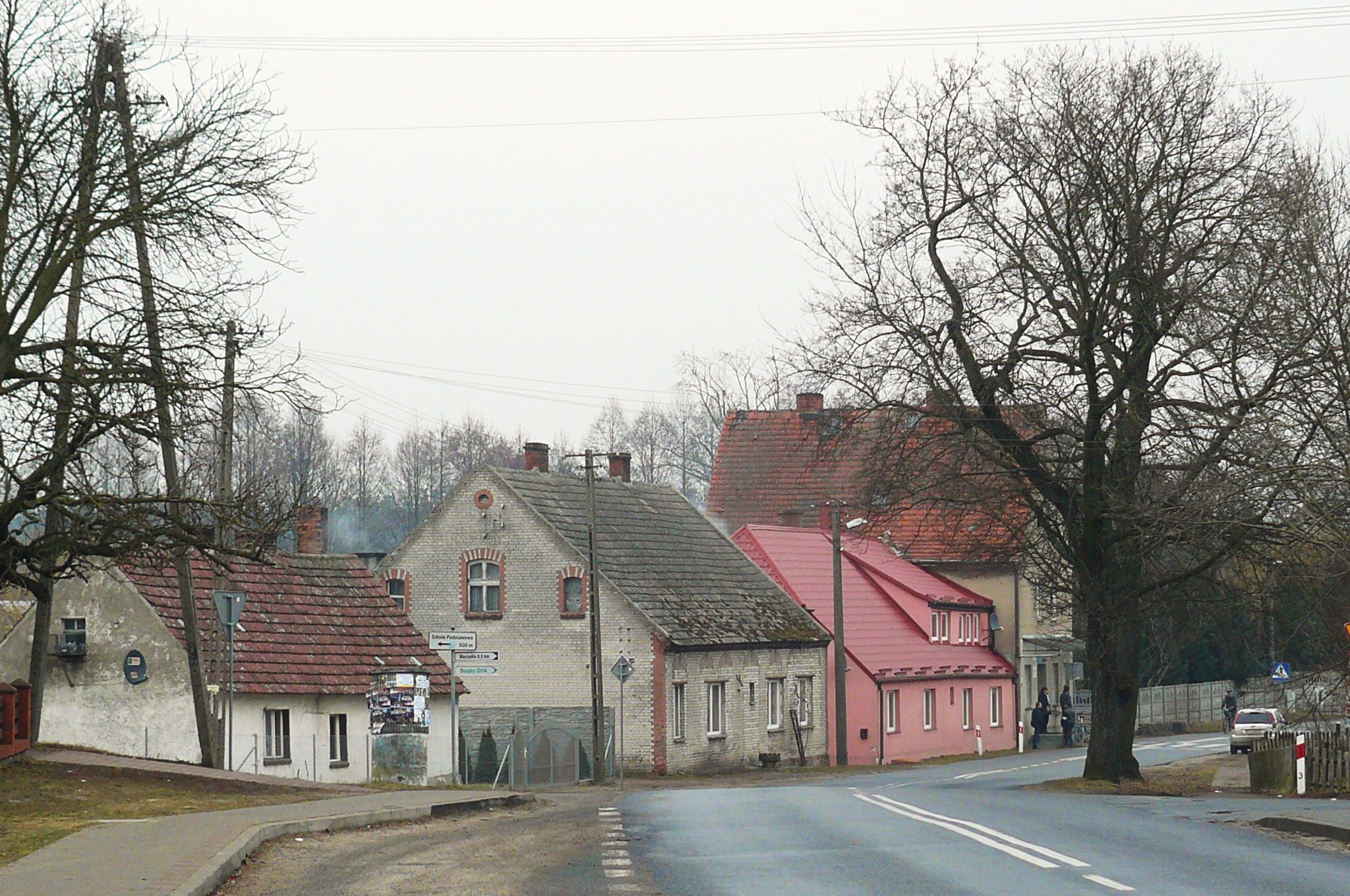
- Village's centre

- Location within Poland
- Coordinates: 52°50′N 15°58′E
- Country: Poland
- Voivodeship: Greater Poland
- County: Czarnków-Trzcianka
- Gmina: Drawsko

Chełst [xɛu̯st] (German: Neuteich) is a village in the administrative district of Gmina Drawsko, within Czarnków-Trzcianka County, Greater Poland Voivodeship, in west-central Poland.
