= Gmina Wieleń =

Gmina Wieleń Wieleń Commune
- Gmina
- Flag Coat of arms
- Interactive map of Gmina Wieleń
- Coordinates (Wieleń): 52°53′32″N 16°10′25″E
- Country: Poland
- Voivodeship: Greater Poland
- County: Czarnków-Trzcianka
- Seat: Wieleń

Area
  - Total: 428.32 km^{2} (165.38 sq mi)

Population (2006)
  - Total: 12,572
  - Density: 29.352/km^{2} (76.021/sq mi)
  - Urban: 5,940
  - Rural: 6,632
- Website: http://www.wielen.pl

Gmina Wieleń is an urban-rural gmina (administrative district) in Czarnków-Trzcianka County, Greater Poland Voivodeship, in west-central Poland. Its seat is the town of Wieleń, which lies approximately 27 kilometres (17 mi) west of Czarnków and 75 km (47 mi) north-west of the regional capital Poznań.

The gmina covers an area of 428.32 square kilometres (165.4 sq mi), and as of 2006 its total population is 12,572 (out of which the population of Wieleń amounts to 5,940, and the population of the rural part of the gmina is 6,632).

== Villages ==
Apart from the town of Wieleń, Gmina Wieleń contains the villages and settlements of Biała, Dębogóra, Dzierżążno Małe, Dzierżążno Wielkie, Folsztyn, Gieczynek, Gulcz, Hamrzysko, Herburtowo, Kałądek, Kocień Wielki, Kuźniczka, Marianowo, Mężyk, Miały, Nowe Dwory, Rosko, Wrzeszczyna and Zielonowo.

== Neighbouring gminas ==
Gmina Wieleń is bordered by the gminas of Czarnków, Człopa, Drawsko, Krzyż Wielkopolski, Lubasz, Trzcianka and Wronki.
