= Przyłęki, Greater Poland Voivodeship =

Przyłęki
- Village
- Location within Poland
- Coordinates: 52°58′22″N 16°20′07″E
- Country: Poland
- Voivodeship: Greater Poland
- County: Czarnków-Trzcianka
- Gmina: Trzcianka

Przyłęki ([pʂɨˈwɛnki]; German: Ivenbusch) is a village in the administrative district of Gmina Trzcianka, within Czarnków-Trzcianka County, Greater Poland Voivodeship, in west-central Poland.
