= Lubasz, Greater Poland Voivodeship =

Lubasz
- Village
- Location within Poland
- Coordinates: 52°52′N 16°31′E
- Country: Poland
- Voivodeship: Greater Poland
- County: Czarnków-Trzcianka
- Gmina: Lubasz
- Population: 2,500

Lubasz [ˈlubaʂ]; German: Lubasch is a village in Czarnków-Trzcianka County, Greater Poland Voivodeship, in west-central Poland. It is the seat of the gmina (administrative district) called Gmina Lubasz.
