= Dzierżążno Wielkie =

- Village
- Location within Poland
- Coordinates: 52°59′N 16°13′E
- Country: Poland
- Voivodeship: Greater Poland
- County: Czarnków-Trzcianka
- Gmina: Wieleń
- Population: 530

Dzierżążno Wielkie [d͡ʑɛrˈʐɔ̃ʐnɔ ˈvjɛlkʲɛ] (German: Groß Drensen) is a village in the administrative district of Gmina Wieleń, within Czarnków-Trzcianka County, Greater Poland Voivodeship, in west-central Poland.
