= Gmina Krzyż Wielkopolski =

Gmina Krzyż Wielkopolski Krzyż Wielkopolski Commune
- Gmina
- Coat of arms
- Interactive map of Gmina Krzyż Wielkopolski
- Coordinates (Krzyż Wielkopolski): 52°52′45″N 16°0′30″E
- Country: Poland
- Voivodeship: Greater Poland
- County: Czarnków-Trzcianka
- Seat: Krzyż Wielkopolski

Area
  - Total: 174.56 km^{2} (67.40 sq mi)

Population (2006)
  - Total: 8,791
  - Density: 50.36/km^{2} (130.4/sq mi)
  - Urban: 6,283
  - Rural: 2,508
- Website: http://www.krzyz.pl/

Gmina Krzyż Wielkopolski is an urban-rural gmina (administrative district) in Czarnków-Trzcianka County, Greater Poland Voivodeship, in west-central Poland. Its seat is the town of Krzyż Wielkopolski, which lies approximately 38 kilometres (24 mi) west of Czarnków and 82 km (51 mi) north-west of the regional capital Poznań.

The gmina covers an area of 174.56 square kilometres (67.4 sq mi), and as of 2006 its total population is 8,791 (out of which the population of Krzyż Wielkopolski amounts to 6,283, and the population of the rural part of the gmina is 2,508).

== Villages ==
Apart from the town of Krzyż Wielkopolski, Gmina Krzyż Wielkopolski contains the villages and settlements of Brzegi, Huta Szklana, Kuźnica Żelichowska, Łokacz Mały, Łokacz Wielki, Lubcz Mały, Lubcz Wielki, Nowe Bielice, Pestkownica, Przesieki, Rzeczyn, Wizany, Zacisze and Żelichowo.

== Neighbouring gminas ==
Gmina Krzyż Wielkopolski is bordered by the gminas of Człopa, Dobiegniew, Drawsko, Drezdenko and Wieleń.
