= Nowina, Czarnków-Trzcianka County =

Nowina
- Village
- Location within Poland
- Coordinates: 52°50′N 16°28′E
- Country: Poland
- Voivodeship: Greater Poland
- County: Czarnków-Trzcianka
- Gmina: Lubasz

Nowina [nɔˈvina] is a village in the administrative district of Gmina Lubasz, within Czarnków-Trzcianka County, Greater Poland Voivodeship, in west-central Poland.
