= Rosko, Poland =

Rosko
- Village
- Location within Poland
- Coordinates: 52°52′N 16°19′E
- Country: Poland
- Voivodeship: Greater Poland
- County: Czarnków-Trzcianka
- Gmina: Wieleń
- Population: 1,450

Rosko ([ˈrɔskɔ]) is a village in the administrative district of Gmina Wieleń, within Czarnków-Trzcianka County, Greater Poland Voivodeship, in west-central Poland.
