= Przesieki =

- Village
- Location within Poland
- Coordinates: 53°1′N 15°59′E
- Country: Poland
- Voivodeship: Greater Poland
- County: Czarnków-Trzcianka
- Gmina: Krzyż Wielkopolski

Przesieki ([pʂɛˈɕɛki]; German: Prossekel, 1904–1945 Wiesental) is a village in the administrative district of Gmina Krzyż Wielkopolski, within Czarnków-Trzcianka County, Greater Poland Voivodeship, in west-central Poland.
