= Drawsko, Greater Poland Voivodeship =

Drawsko
- Village
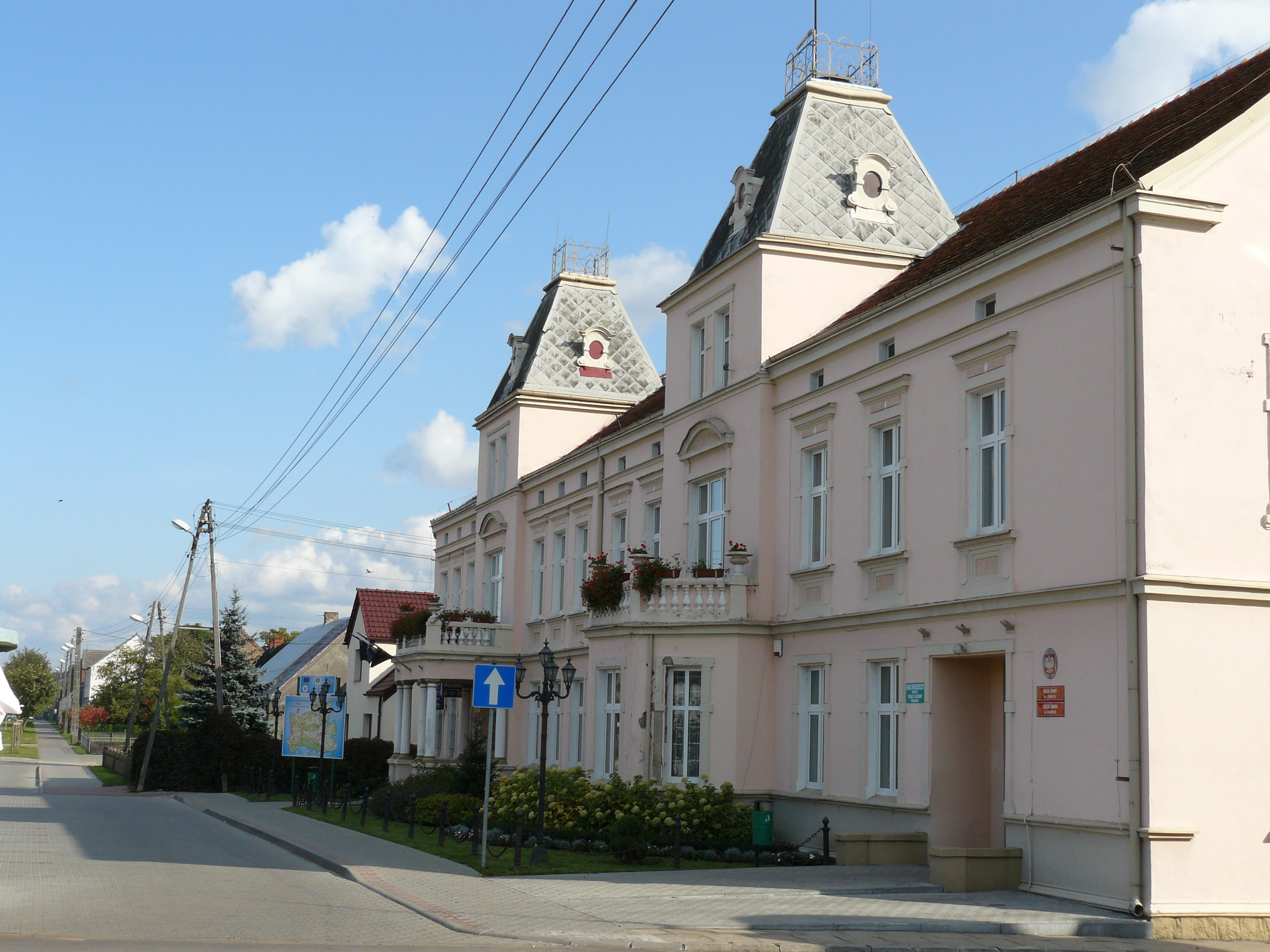
- Municipal Office

- Location within Poland
- Coordinates: 52°51′N 16°2′E
- Country: Poland
- Voivodeship: Greater Poland
- County: Czarnków-Trzcianka
- Gmina: Drawsko
- Highest elevation: 50 m (160 ft)
- Lowest elevation: 35 m (115 ft)

Population
  - Total: 1,640
- Time zone: UTC+1 (CET)
  - Summer (DST): UTC+2 (CEST)
- ISO 3166 code: POL
- Vehicle registration: PCT
- Website: http://www.gminadrawsko.pl

Drawsko [ˈdrafskɔ] (German: Dratzig) is a village in Czarnków-Trzcianka County, Greater Poland Voivodeship, in west-central Poland. It is the seat of the gmina (administrative district) called Gmina Drawsko.

== History ==
The remains of six skeletons, which were allegedly interred as vampires in the 17th and 18th century, were found in archaeologic excavations of the local cemetery. However the theory about "vampire burials" there has been contested later.

During the German occupation of Poland (World War II), the Polish resistance was active in the village.
