= Połajewo, Greater Poland Voivodeship =

Połajewo
- Village
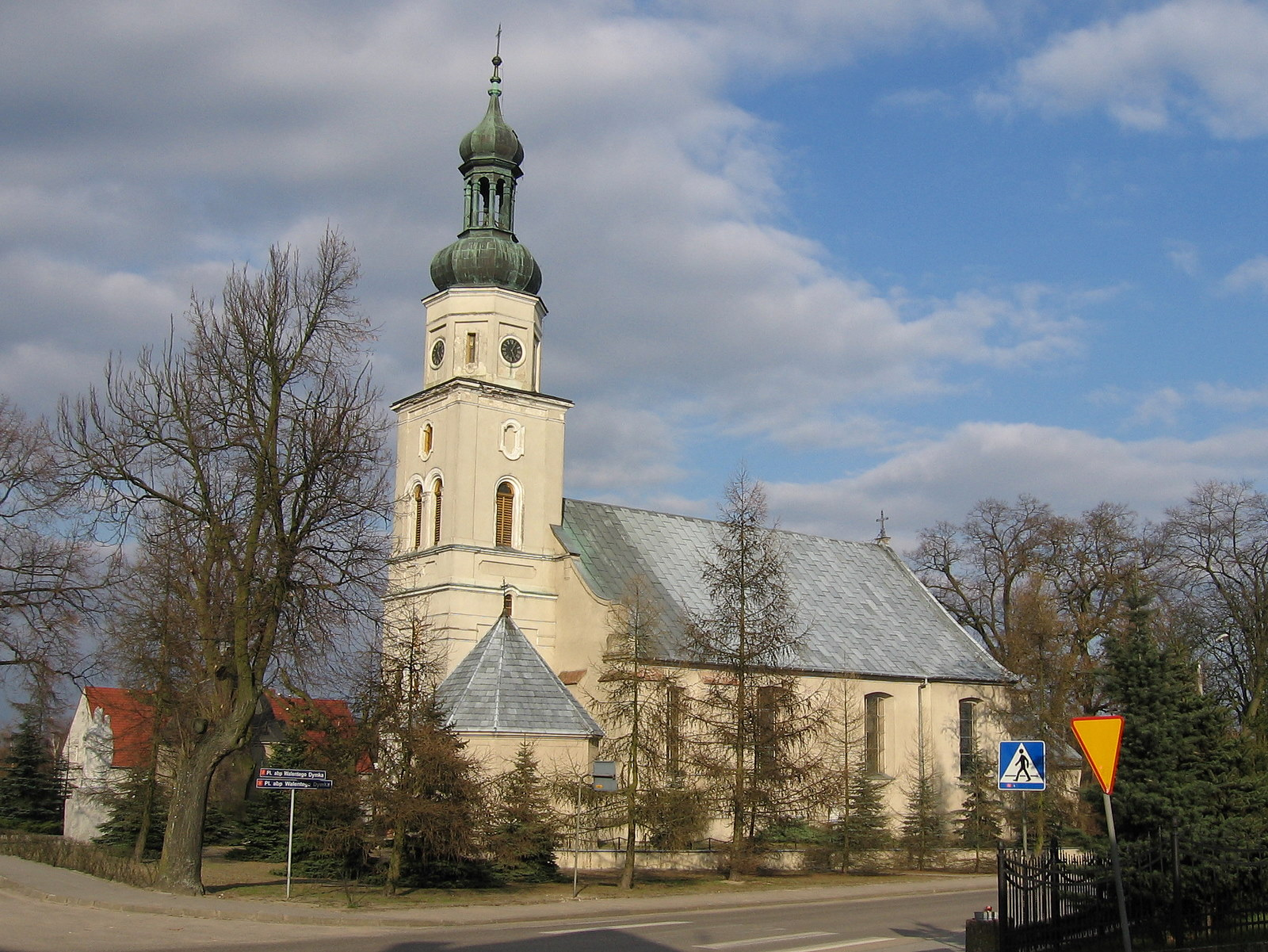
- Church of Saint Michael Archangel

- Location within Poland
- Coordinates: 52°47′48″N 16°44′21″E
- Country: Poland
- Voivodeship: Greater Poland
- County: Czarnków-Trzcianka
- Gmina: Połajewo
- Elevation: 70 m (230 ft)

Population
  - Total: 2,237

Połajewo [pɔwaˈjɛvɔ] (German: Güldenau) is a village in Czarnków-Trzcianka County, Greater Poland Voivodeship, in west-central Poland. It is the seat of the gmina (administrative district) called Gmina Połajewo.
