= Wrząca, Czarnków-Trzcianka County =

Wrząca
- Village
- Location within Poland
- Coordinates: 53°4′40″N 16°35′51″E
- Country: Poland
- Voivodeship: Greater Poland
- County: Czarnków-Trzcianka
- Gmina: Trzcianka
- Population: 220

Wrząca ([ˈvʐɔnt͡sa]; German: Fratzig) is a village in the administrative district of Gmina Trzcianka, within Czarnków-Trzcianka County, Greater Poland Voivodeship, in west-central Poland.
