= Lugnano in Teverina =

- Comune
- Comune di Lugnano in Teverina
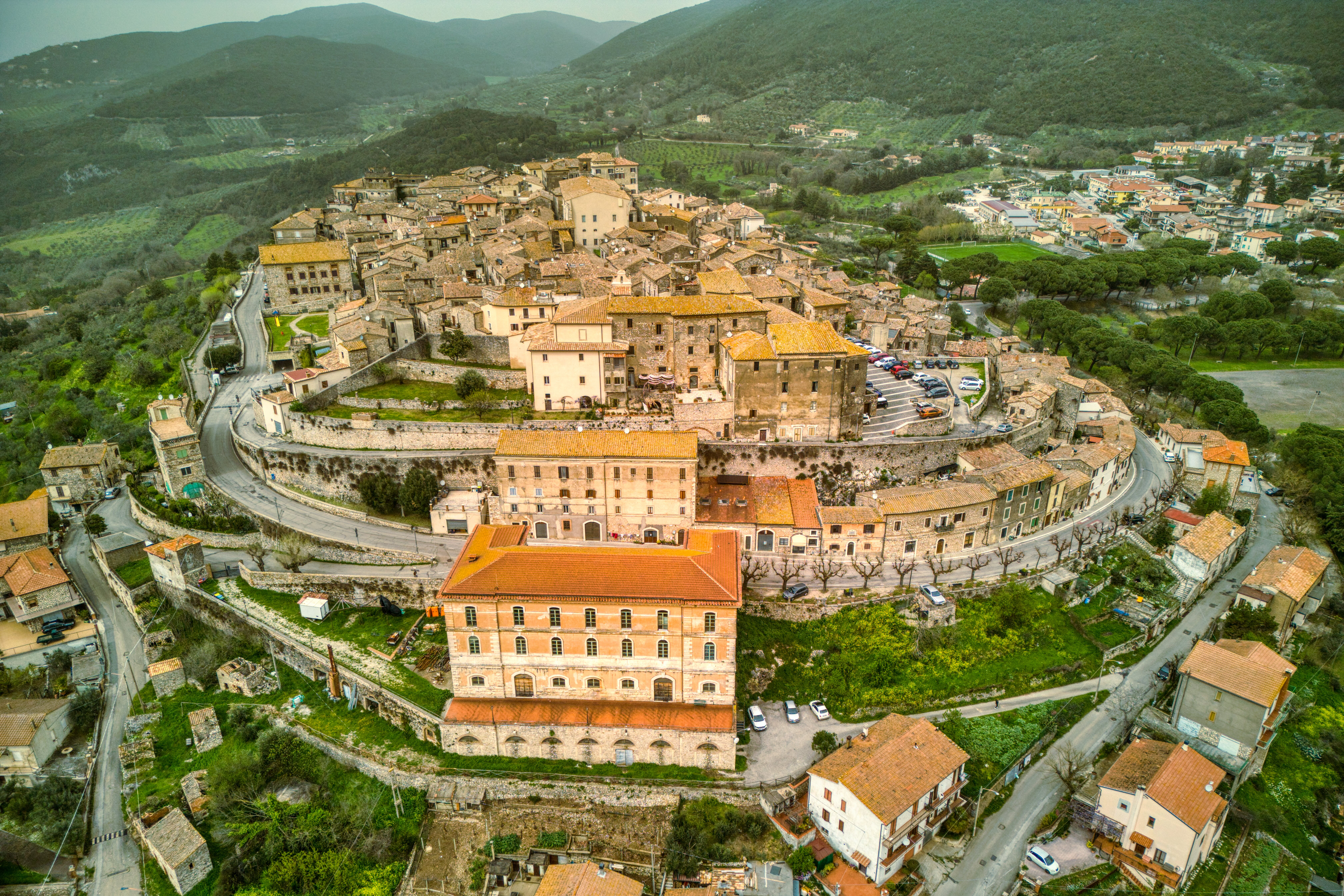
- View of Lugnano in Teverina

- Coat of arms

- Location within Italy Location within Umbria
- Coordinates: 42.574317°N 12.330548°E
- Country: Italy
- Region: Umbria
- Province: Terni (TR)

Government
  - Mayor: Gianluca Filiberti

Area
  - Total: 29.83 km^{2} (11.52 sq mi)
- Elevation: 419 m (1,375 ft)

Population (1 January 2025)
  - Total: 1,396
  - Density: 46.80/km^{2} (121.2/sq mi)
- Demonym: Lugnanesi
- Time zone: UTC+1 (CET)
  - Summer (DST): UTC+2 (CEST)
- Postal code: 05020
- Dialing code: 0744
- Patron saint: Assumption of Mary
- Saint day: August 15
- Website: Official website

Lugnano in Teverina is a comune (municipality) in the Province of Terni in the Italian region Umbria, located about 60 km south of Perugia and about 25 km west of Terni.

Lugnano in Teverina borders the following municipalities: Alviano, Amelia, Attigliano, Graffignano. It is one of I Borghi più belli d'Italia ("The most beautiful villages of Italy").

== Etymology ==
The name Lugnano derives from the earlier form Luchiano, the name of the destroyed settlement near Amelia from which the inhabitants fled.

== History ==
Lugnano in Teverina originated in the 7th century, when inhabitants fleeing the Barbarian invasions sought refuge on a rocky spur following the destruction of Luchiano.

Lugnano is already mentioned in the 8th century. The remains of numerous towers and well-fortified walls indicate that it was an important and strongly defended feudal center, for which it was known as the Città della Teverina.

In 1047 the fief belonged to the Bovaccini counts. In 1176 it suffered significant damage during a siege carried out by the forces of Todi and Amelia, and the surrounding territory was again devastated in 1293. In 1301 it was attacked by the people of Orvieto, who inflicted further damage.

Owing to its strategic importance and strong position, a member of the powerful Monaldeschi family of Orvieto settled there. In the 13th century, during the conflicts between Guelphs and Ghibellines, Vanno dei Monaldeschi married a woman of the Filippeschi family and withdrew to Lugnano. From him originated the Vannicelli family, which remained associated with the town in the following centuries.

During the Middle Ages the town was contested by Todi, Amelia and Orvieto. In 1301 it was constituted as a self-governing community, with Ugolino D'Alviano serving as podestà.

In 1392 Giovanni, son of Vanno, and his descendant Vannicello were admitted to the nobility of Amelia, after which the Vannicelli became linked to that city while continuing to reside in Lugnano.

In the later medieval period it came under the authority of Orvieto, and subsequently passed under the control of the Papal State. The Farnese family held the position of perpetual governors.

In 1508 its statutes were renewed by Pope Julius II. In 1580 Pope Gregory XIII confirmed the municipality's autonomy. During the Restoration period it was subject to the administration of Amelia.

In the mid-19th century Lugnano had a population of 1,194 inhabitants. About half of the population resided within the town and the remainder in the surrounding countryside.

In 1860 Lugnano was annexed to the Kingdom of Italy and adopted the name Lugnano in Teverina.

In 1912 electric power was introduced. In 1913 the noble Vannicelli family donated 1,000 hectares (2,500 acres) of land to the communal agrarian body.

== Geography ==
Lugnano in Teverina is situated at an elevation of 441 meters (1,447 ft) above sea level, on a hill to the west of Amelia and on the left bank of the Tiber, at a distance of 9 kilometres (5.6 mi). It situated about 3 miles (4.8 km) north of Alviano. The surrounding territory includes wooded areas connected with the foothills of the Apennines.

The climate is described as rather cold, with strong northern winds.

=== Subdivisions ===
The municipality includes the localities of Ceoli, Collesecco, Fontana, Lugnano in Teverina.

In 2021, 430 people lived in rural dispersed dwellings not assigned to any named locality. At the time, the most populous locality was Lugnano in Teverina proper (922).

== Economy ==
The surrounding territory is covered with olive groves, which constituted the principal source of wealth in the 19th century. The area also produced wine and cereals.

== Religion ==
=== Church of Santa Maria Assunta ===
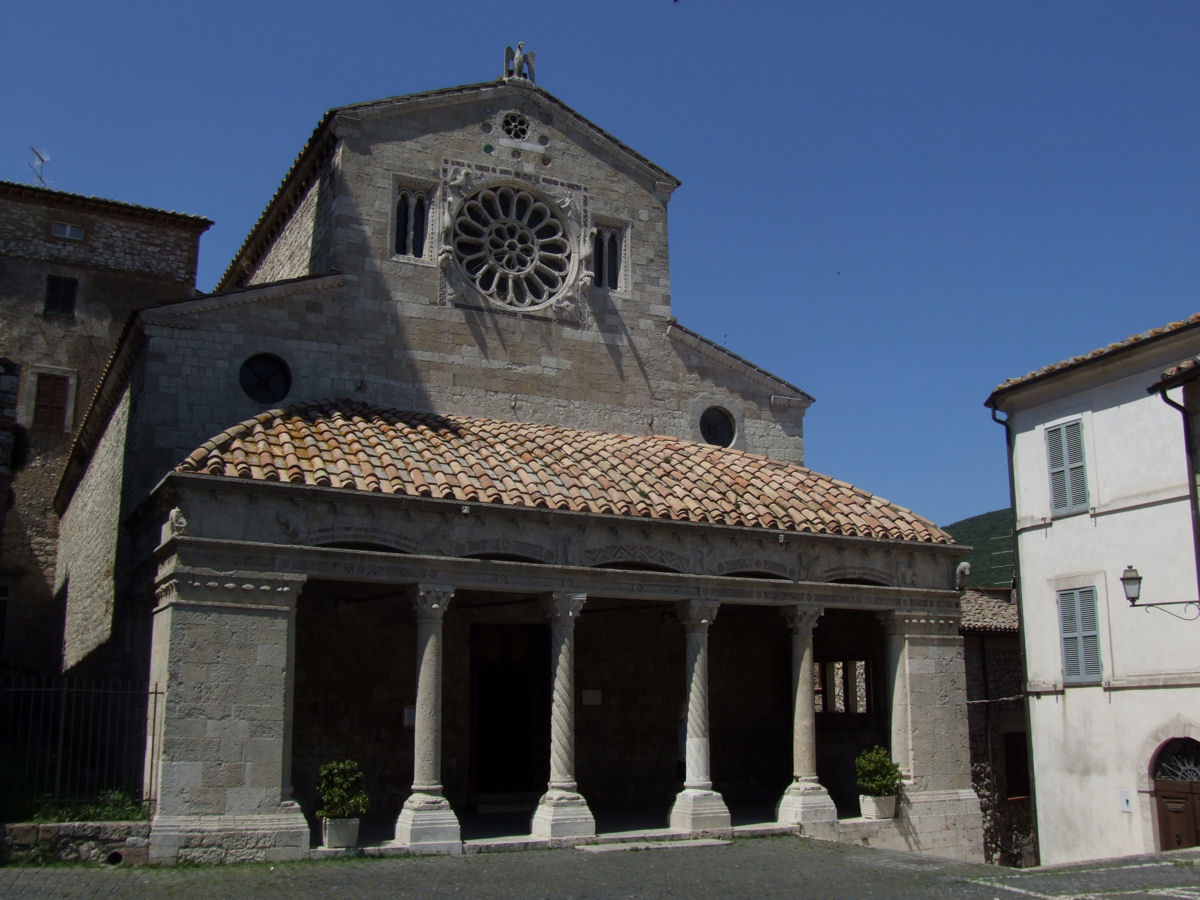
Church of Santa Maria Assunta

The principal church is the collegiate church dedicated to the Assumption of the Virgin Mary, patron saint of the town, whose feast is celebrated on 15 August. It also serves as a parish church.

The Church of Santa Maria Assunta dates back to the 13th century and is noted for its rich architectural decoration. The external portico is adorned with four bas-reliefs representing Saint Michael the Archangel, the Meeting of Mary and Saint Elizabeth, and ornamental motifs. An inscription on the façade bears the date 1230. The front of the church was remodeled in the 15th century.

The interior is divided into three naves with columns topped by varied and finely decorated capitals, believed to have belonged to an earlier Christian building of the 8th or 9th century. In the right nave, inscriptions record restorations carried out in 1499 and 1543. The floor features mosaics in the so-called Alexandrian style.

Two stairways lead to the presbytery, beneath which is a crypt with entrances and small windows decorated with simple mosaic bands; its vault is supported by ten small columns.

Above the third altar in the right nave is a tempera triptych depicting the Virgin holding the Child, surrounded by music-playing angels, with Saint Francis on the left and Saint Sebastian on the right, attributed to Niccolò Alunno. In the sacristy are two reliquaries, one in silver and the other in gilded metal, both dating to the 15th century.

=== Church of San Francesco ===
The Church of San Francesco preserves several works dating mainly to the 16th and early 17th centuries. Under the external portico are frescoes depicting the Virgin enthroned with the Child, Saint Sebastian, and Saint Roch, executed in the 16th century.

Inside, to the left of the high altar, there is a tempera painting of the Foligno school representing the Virgin in sorrow with Saint John, also dating to the 16th century. From the same period is a wooden crucifix placed at the high altar.

At the third altar on the right is a painting dated 1601, depicting the Virgin and Child enthroned below, with Saint Sebastian, Saint Diego, and Saint Roch; it is attributed to an imitator of Agresti. In the sacristy there is a half-length image of the Virgin with Child, considered a work of the school of Barocci.

=== Other religious buildings ===
The high altar on the Confraternity of the Misericordia contains an oil painting representing the Beheading of Saint John the Baptist, signed and dated 1537 by Livio Agresti of Forlì, and regarded as one of his finest works.

== Culture ==
=== Roman villa at Poggio Gramignano ===
The ancient Roman villa at Poggio Gramignano lay in the hills near the Tiber, 7 km from ancient Amelia in Umbrian territory. It was a large luxurious villa rustica with farm-estate attached. It has been partially excavated.

It was built in the late 1st century BC when it included large room (oecus) with supporting columns and a unique flat-top pyramidal ceiling; the foundations and soil of the hill could not support the great weight leading to collapse of the colonnade and other southern rooms around the early 2nd century AD; in the early 3rd century, walls and support buttresses were built to try to stop further slippage but from this time the villa began to fall into ruin although it was still partially occupied; in the mid 5th century many rooms were reused as a cemetery for at least 47 children up to 3 years old who died perhaps of malaria.

=== Necropolis ===
Nearby is the site known as the Children's Necropolis, dating to the mid-5th century AD. The site includes the burial grounds of new-born and aborted fetuses. Some of the burials seem to have been so-called "vampire burials". These burial practices, such as inserting a stone into the mouth of the deceased, have been interpreted as means to prevent the rising of the dead. Modern research has indicated that many of the burials were victims of malaria, a disease whose origins were unknown until the 19th century. Vampire burials may have been practiced in the hope that the spread of disease would be curtailed.

=== Other cultural sites ===
- Palazzo Pennone
- Palazzo of the Bufalari Counts

== Notable people ==
The Vannicelli family originated in Lugnano from Vanno dei Monaldeschi in the 13th century and remained prominent in subsequent centuries. Among its notable members were Giovanni Vannicelli, a military advisor to the king of Portugal and later commander of papal troops; Tranquillo Vannicelli, who held offices in Rome and abroad; Monsignor Lorenzo Vannicelli, governor of Benevento in 1709; and Cardinal Luigi Vannicelli Casoni.

Other prominent families recorded in the 19th century are the Bufalari, Cantucci, Vicini, and Trasatti families.
