= Biela =

Biela may refer to:

- Biela, Bohemia, former name of a town in eastern Bohemia, now Luže
- Biela, Greater Poland Voivodeship (west-central Poland)
- Biela (river), a river in eastern Germany.
- Wilhelm Freiherr von Biela, an Austrian military officer and amateur astronomer.
- 3D/Biela, a comet discovered by Wilhelm Freiherr von Biela.
- Frank Biela, a German auto race driver.
- Biela (crater), a lunar crater

== See also ==
- Biala (disambiguation)
- Biella
