= Piłka, Czarnków-Trzcianka County =

Piłka
- Village
- Location within Poland
- Coordinates: 52°47′28″N 16°3′19″E
- Country: Poland
- Voivodeship: Greater Poland
- County: Czarnków-Trzcianka
- Gmina: Drawsko

Piłka [ˈpiu̯ka] (German: Schneidemühlchen) is a village in the administrative district of Gmina Drawsko, within Czarnków-Trzcianka County, Greater Poland Voivodeship, in west-central Poland.
