= Straduń =

- Village
- Location within Poland
- Coordinates: 53°3′N 16°23′E
- Country: Poland
- Voivodeship: Greater Poland
- County: Czarnków-Trzcianka
- Gmina: Trzcianka
- Population: 200

Straduń ([ˈstraduɲ]; German: Straduhn) is a village in the administrative district of Gmina Trzcianka, within Czarnków-Trzcianka County, Greater Poland Voivodeship, in westcentral Poland.
