= Smolarnia, Czarnków-Trzcianka County =

Smolarnia
- Village
- Location within Poland
- Coordinates: 53°2′N 16°22′E
- Country: Poland
- Voivodeship: Greater Poland
- County: Czarnków-Trzcianka
- Gmina: Trzcianka
- Population (approx.): 130

Smolarnia ([smɔˈlarɲa]; German: Theerofen) is a village in the administrative district of Gmina Trzcianka, within Czarnków-Trzcianka County, Greater Poland Voivodeship, in west-central Poland.

The village has an approximate population of 130.
