= Biały =

Biały is Polish for "white". The word is a Polish surname, as well as a nickname of several Polish monarchs and noblemen. The feminine form is Biała. Notable people with the name include:

- Leszek Biały (c. 1186–1227), High Duke of Poland
- Henryk Biały (13th century), Duke of Wroclaw
- Władysław Biały (14th century), Duke of Gniewkowo
- Konrad Biały
  - Konrad VII the White (1396–1452)
  - Konrad X the White (1420–1492)
- Biały, a codename for Bolesław Kontrym, Polish Army World War II officer
- Janice Biala, Polish-born American artist
- Harvey Bialy (1945–2020), American molecular biologist
- Leszek Włodzimierz Biały (born 1954), Polish writer, translator and diplomat
