= Biała, Rzeszów =

Biała
- District
- Location within Poland
- Coordinates: 49°58′48″N 22°1′16″E
- Country: Poland
- Voivodeship: Subcarpathian
- City: Rzeszów

Biała [ˈbʲawa] (Ukrainian: Біла Bila) is a district of Rzeszów, Subcarpathian Voivodeship, in south-eastern Poland. It merged with Rzeszów on 1 January 2009.

The former village had a population of 1,300.

== History ==
As a result of the first of Partitions of Poland (Treaty of St-Petersburg dated 5 July 1772, the Galicia area was attributed to the Habsburg Monarchy. BIALA was one of the 79 Bezirkshauptmannschaft (powiat?) in Austrian Galicia.

For more details, see the article Kingdom of Galicia and Lodomeria.

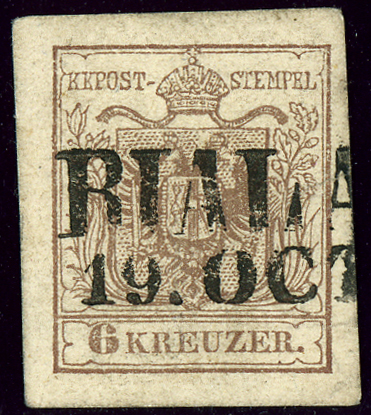
Austria KK stamp first issue 1850, cancelled BIALA
