= Czarnków–Trzcianka County =

Czarnków–Trzcianka County Powiat czarnkowsko-trzcianecki
- County
- Flag Coat of arms

- Location within the voivodeship
- Coordinates (Czarnków): 52°54′N 16°34′E
- Country: Poland
- Voivodeship: Greater Poland
- Seat: Czarnków
- Gminas: Total 8 (incl. 1 urban): Czarnków; Gmina Czarnków; Gmina Drawsko; Gmina Krzyż Wielkopolski; Gmina Lubasz; Gmina Połajewo; Gmina Trzcianka; Gmina Wieleń

Area
  - Total: 1,808.19 km^{2} (698.15 sq mi)

Population (2006)
  - Total: 86,134
  - Density: 47.635/km^{2} (123.38/sq mi)
  - Urban: 40,335
  - Rural: 45,799
- Car plates: PCT
- Website: www.czarnkowsko-trzcianecki.pl

Czarnków–Trzcianka County (Polish: powiat czarnkowsko-trzcianecki) is a county in Greater Poland Voivodeship, west-central Poland. It came into being on January 1, 1999, as a result of the Polish local government reforms passed in 1998. Its administrative seat is the town of Czarnków, which lies 61 kilometres (38 mi) north-west of the regional capital Poznań. The county contains three other towns: Trzcianka, 18 km (11 mi) north of Czarnków, Krzyż Wielkopolski, 38 km (24 mi) west of Czarnków, and Wieleń, 27 km (17 mi) west of Czarnków.

The county covers an area of 1,808.19 square kilometres (698.1 sq mi). As of 2006 its total population is 86,134, out of which the population of Trzcianka is 16,756, that of Czarnków is 11,356, that of Krzyż Wielkopolski is 6,283, that of Wieleń is 5,940, and the rural population is 45,799.

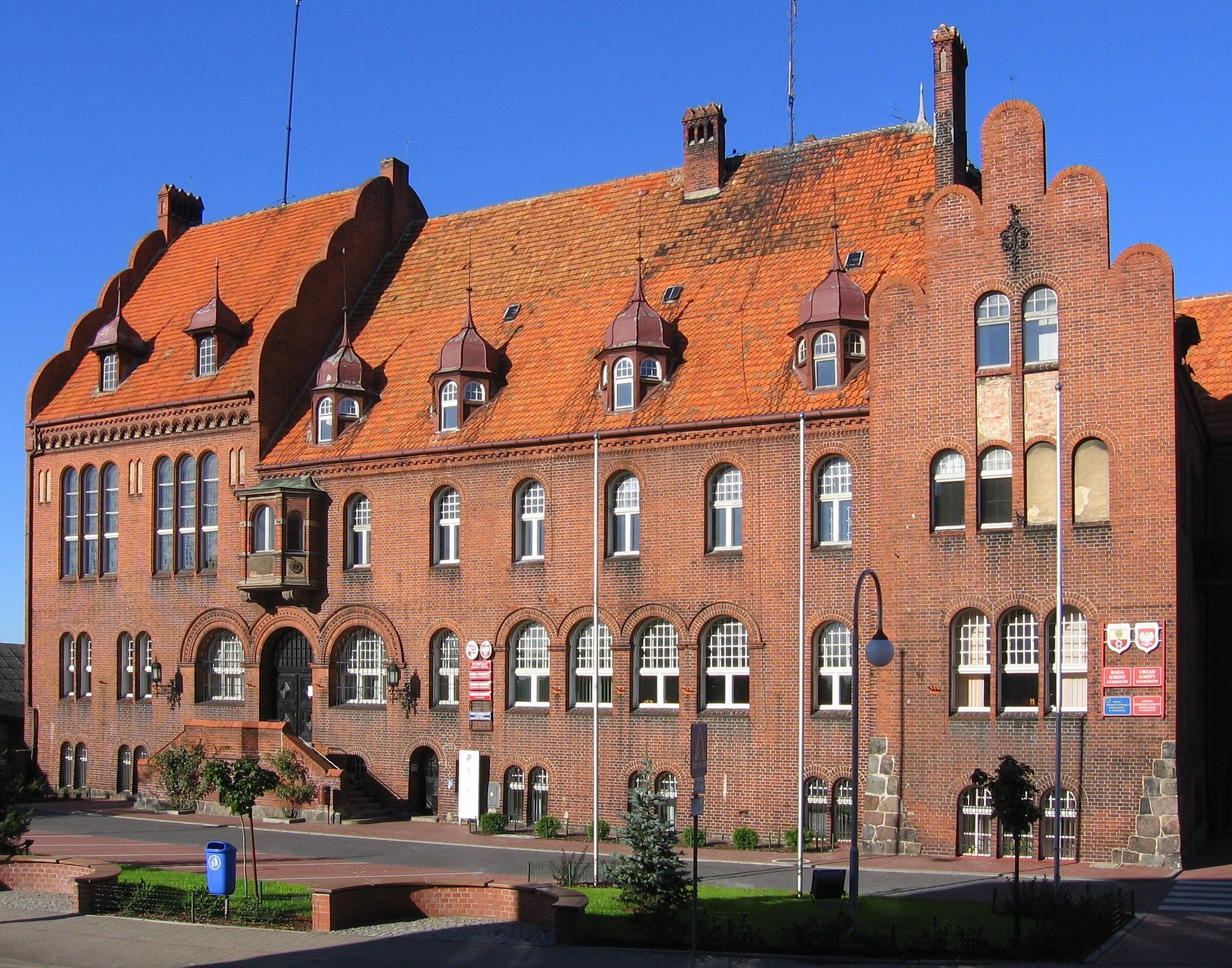
County Office in Czarnków

== Neighbouring counties ==
Czarnków–Trzcianka County is bordered by Wałcz County and Piła County to the north, Chodzież County to the east, Oborniki County and Szamotuły County to the south, Międzychód County to the south-west, and Strzelce-Drezdenko County to the west.

== Administrative divisions ==
The county is subdivided into eight gminas (one urban, three urban-rural and four rural). These are listed in the following table, in descending order of population.

Gmina	Type	Area (km^{2})	Population (2006)	Seat
Gmina Trzcianka	urban-rural	375.3	23,482	Trzcianka
Gmina Wieleń	urban-rural	428.3	12,572	Wieleń
Czarnków	urban	9.7	11,356	
Gmina Czarnków	rural	347.8	10,887	Czarnków *
Gmina Krzyż Wielkopolski	urban-rural	174.6	8,791	Krzyż Wielkopolski
Gmina Lubasz	rural	167.6	6,992	Lubasz
Gmina Połajewo	rural	142.0	6,140	Połajewo
Gmina Drawsko	rural	163.0	5,914	Drawsko
* seat not part of the gmina
