= Vistula-Oder Waterway =

Waterway

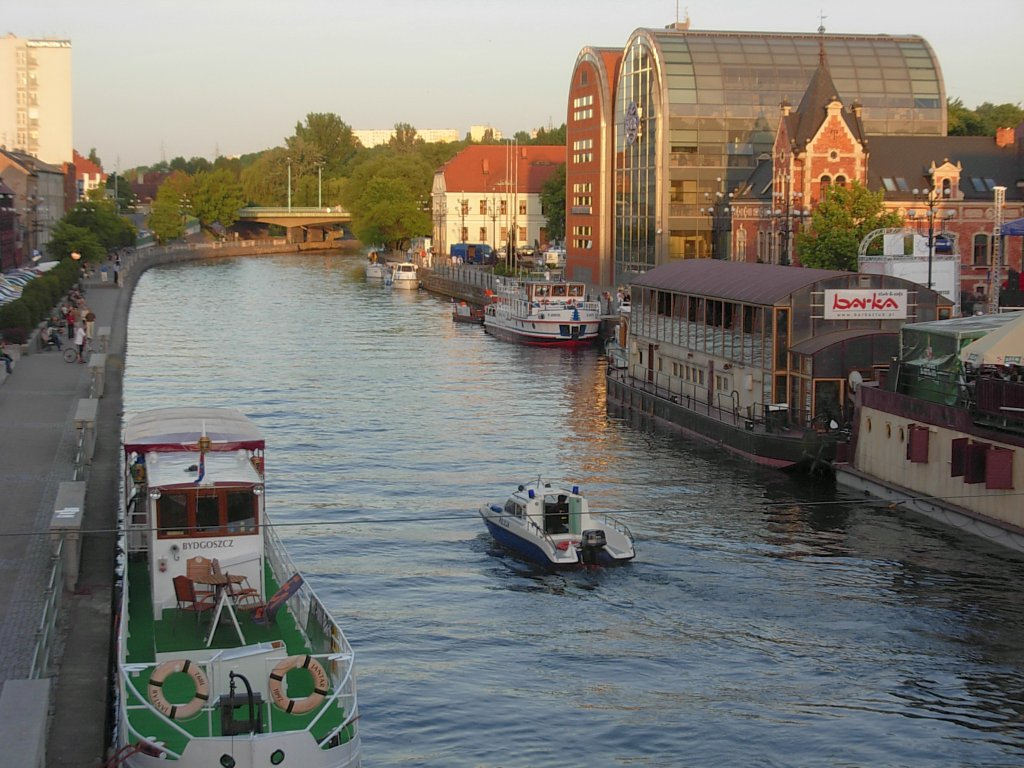
Brda in the center of Bydgoszcz

The Vistula-Oder Waterway is a section of the Waterway E70, one of the country's three international waterways. (Note: alongside the Oder Waterway and the Vistula waterway.) It constitutes Poland's only existing connection of the eastern and western systems of European waterways. It runs through three provinces: Kujawsko-Pomorskie Province, Wielkopolskie Province and Lubuskie Province.

== Vistula-Odra road as part of the E70 route ==
In 1996, the Vistula-Oder waterway was included in the network of the European waterway system as part of the Waterway E70 in the AGN (European Agreement on Main Inland Waterways of International Importance) agreement.

== Components ==
The Vistula-Oder waterway is divided into the following sections:

- Brda canalized (Bydgoszcz Brdyujście – Bydgoszcz Okole) – 14.4 km.
- Bydgoszcz Canal (Bydgoszcz Okole – Nakło nad Notecią) – 24.5 km.
- Noteć canalized (Nakło nad Notecią – Krzyż Wielkopolski) – 137.1 km,

This section consists of two parts:

  - Noteć Leniwa – 66.4 km (from Nakło to the mouth of the Gwda),
  - Noteć Bystra – 70.7 km (from the mouth of the Gwda to Krzyż Wlkp).
- Noteć swobodnie płynąca (Krzyż Wielkopolski – Drezdenko – Santok) – 50.1 km.
- Lower Warta (Santok – Gorzów Wielkopolski – Kostrzyn nad Odrą) – 68.2 km.

== History ==
The beginning of the waterway connecting the Vistula and Oder rivers was the construction of the Bydgoszcz Canal (1773–1774), which connected the Vistula (Brda) and Oder (Noteć) river basins. The canal was rebuilt twice: at the beginning of the 19th century and in 1908–1915. The first regulation works on the Noteć , which resulted in the construction of water steps and a deepened and straightened riverbed, were carried out in 1863–1888. Between 1891 and 1898, the Noteć Bystra was regulated on the section between the mouth of the Gwda and the Drawa. A total of 105 cuts were made between Nakło and the mouth of the Drawa, eliminating river bends with a radius of less than 180 m, shortening the course of the Noteć in this area from 169.8 to 140.1 km. However, these works did not lead to the complete straightening of the river. During subsequent works carried out in 1910–1914, the canalization of the Noteć was completed over a length of 140 km. Between Dziembowo and the mouth of the Drawa, seven water steps (locks and weirs) were built, while in Bydgoszcz a new section of the Bydgoszcz Canal was created with two new locks with a dam height of 7.5 m.

The inland shipping route Vistula-Oder competed economically with the sea route through Gdańsk, taking over most of the transport of timber from Russia and the Kingdom of Poland to the German Empire. The peak of freight transport was recorded in the first decade of the 20th century. (Note: A maximum of 780,000 tons in 1906.) Between 1903 and 1907, an average of 3,585 boats and steamboats passed through the route each year, transporting 253,000 tons of goods and 43,200 rafts with 441,000 tons of timber. After 1920, the waterway was divided by the political border between Poland and Germany, which had a negative impact on the volume of cargo shipping. The waterway became entirely within Poland's borders after 1945. The economic importance of the route declined after 1980, but since the 1990s, its tourist significance has been growing.

== Marinas ==
The most important marinas:

- Bydgoszcz
- Nakło nad Notecią
- Ujście
- Czarnków
- Wieleń
- Krzyż Wielkopolski
- Drezdenko
- Santok
- Gorzów Wielkopolski
- Kostrzyn nad Odrą

== Infrastructure ==
There are (from Bydgoszcz to Krzyż) 22 navigation locks, several large ports and transshipment quays, including in Bydgoszcz, Nakło, Ujście, Czarnków, Krzyż, Gorzów and Kostrzyn and many passenger marinas including in Bydgoszcz, Santok, Gorzów and Kostrzyn.

Locks on the Vistula–Oder Waterway

No.	Name	Location	Kilometre mark km	Watercourse	Drop m	Length m	Width m	Drive
1.	Czersko Polskie Lock	Bydgoszcz (Brdyujście)	1.4	Brda	4.90	115.0	12.0	electric
2.	City Lock, Bydgoszcz	Bydgoszcz (Śródmieście)	12.4	Brda	3.13	57.4	9.6	electric
3.	Okole Lock	Bydgoszcz (Okole)	14.8	Bydgoszcz Canal	7.58	57.4	9.6	electric
4.	Czyżkówko Lock	Bydgoszcz (Flisy)	16.0	Bydgoszcz Canal	7.52	57.4	9.6	electric
5.	Prądy Lock	Bydgoszcz (Prądy)	20.0	Bydgoszcz Canal	3.82	57.4	9.6	manual
6.	Osowa Góra Lock	Bydgoszcz (Osowa Góra)	21.0	Bydgoszcz Canal	3.55	57.4	9.6	manual
7.	Józefinki Lock	Nakło nad Notecią	37.2	Bydgoszcz Canal	1.83	57.4	9.6	manual
8.	Nakło East Lock	Nakło nad Notecią	38.9	Bydgoszcz Canal	1.91	57.4	9.6	manual
9.	Nakło West Lock	Nakło nad Notecią	42.7	Noteć (Lazy Noteć)	2.72	57.4	9.6	manual
10.	Gromadno Lock	Gromadno	53.4	Noteć (Lazy Noteć)	2.08	57.4	9.6	manual
11.	Krostkowo Lock with a sector-and-spindle sluice	Krostkowo	68.2	Noteć (Lazy Noteć)	0.43	57.4	9.6	manual
12.	Nowe Lock	Nowe	111.8	Noteć (Swift Noteć)	1.71	57.4	9.6	manual
13.	Walkowice Lock	Walkowice	117.1	Noteć (Swift Noteć)	1.84	57.4	9.6	manual
14.	Romanowo Lock	Romanowo Dolne	122.6	Noteć (Swift Noteć)	1.59	57.4	9.6	manual
15.	Lipica Lock	Lipica	128.3	Noteć (Swift Noteć)	1.69	57.4	9.6	manual
16.	Pianówka Lock	Pianówka	136.2	Noteć (Swift Noteć)	2.18	57.4	9.6	manual
17.	Mikołajewo Lock	Mikołajewo	143.0	Noteć (Swift Noteć)	1.97	57.4	9.6	manual
18.	Rosko Lock	Rosko	148.8	Noteć (Swift Noteć)	1.53	57.4	9.6	manual
19.	Wrzeszczyna Lock	Wrzeszczyna	155.5	Noteć (Swift Noteć)	1.55	57.4	9.6	manual
20.	Wieleń Lock	Wieleń	161.0	Noteć (Swift Noteć)	1.93	57.4	9.6	manual
21.	Drawsko Lock	Drawsko	170.9	Noteć (Swift Noteć)	1.60	57.4	9.6	manual
22.	Krzyż Wielkopolski Lock	Krzyż Wielkopolski	176.2	Noteć (Swift Noteć)	1.85	57.4	9.6	manual

The Vistula-Oder waterway is besides connected to a number of waterways that serve tourists: the Lubuski Waterway, the Oder, the Warta, the Brda, and the Lower Vistula.

In 2007, the marshals of the six provinces bordering the E-70 road signed an agreement on cooperation in revitalizing this waterway.

== Problems of adapting the Vistula-Odra waterway to international requirements ==
The Vistula-Odra waterway has Class Ib or Class II parameters and does not meet the requirements of the AGN agreement stipulating that inland waterways of international importance should have at least Class IV parameters. (Note: Accessible to ships of 1,500 tons, minimum depth. guaranteed 2.10 m, width 60 m, locks of 190 × 12 m, minimum clearance under bridges of 5.2 m.)

Obtaining these parameters is possible with the construction of new navigation stages on the Vistula, Brda, Warta and Notec, which involves enormous costs and conflicts with the requirements of nature protection (sizable sections of the Oder-Vistula road are located in Natura 2000 areas). In this situation, it is envisaged to maintain the route and the existing hydrotechnical facilities while maintaining the current parameters.

The Ministry of Maritime Economy and Inland Navigation is considering changing the route of the E-70 waterway in Poland with greater use of the Warta River, through Poznań and Włocławek.

== See also ==
- Inland waterways
- Bydgoszcz Canal
- Brda
- Notec
- Warta River
- Warta Mouth National Park

== Bibliography ==
- Badtke, Marek. Kanał Bydgoski. Bydgoszcz, 2006.
- Bartowski, Krzysztof. "On the 231st Anniversary of the Bydgoszcz Canal (1774–2005)." In: *Materials on the History of Culture and Art of Bydgoszcz and the Region*, No. 10, Bydgoszcz 2005.
- Mrozek, Zdzisław. "Through the Locks of the Bydgoszcz Canal." In: *Bydgoszcz Calendar 1995*.
- Słowiński, Mirosław; Nadolny, Grzegorz. *The Greater Poland Loop: Warta – Noteć – Gopło – Warta. A Guide Not Only for Boaters.* Satchwell Publishing, Warsaw, 2007.
- Winid, Walenty. *Kanał Bydgoski*. Warsaw: Institute for the Promotion of Science Publishing, 1928.
- Woźniak-Hlebionek, Agnieszka. "The Bydgoszcz Canal, Brda and Noteć in Prussian Investment Plans in 1773–1915." In: *Bydgoszcz Chronicle* Vol. XXIII (2001), Bydgoszcz 2002.
- Program for the Revitalization and Development of the Bydgoszcz Water Junction (Urban Planning Office of Bydgoszcz).
- "Waterways of the Greater Poland Loop – presentation". rzekanotec.pl. Archived from the original on 2008-05-12.
- Greater Poland Loop Part 1: Kostrzyn nad Odrą – Santok
- Greater Poland Loop Part 2: Santok – Nakło nad Notecią
- Greater Poland Loop Part 3: Nakło nad Notecią – Konin Morzysław
- On the E-70 Waterway Part 1: Kostrzyn nad Odrą – Santok
- On the E-70 Waterway Part 2: Santok – Nakło nad Notecią
- Beer, Marek. "International Waterway E-70." Presentation. Marshal's Office of the Greater Poland Voivodeship.
- "Map of the International Waterway E-70 in Poland". kanaly.info. Archived from the original on 2009-08-19.
- "Technical, Economic-Social, and Environmental Conditions for the Activation of Inland Waterways in the East–West Relation (E-70 and E-60)." Maritime Institute in Gdańsk. Presentation.
- "International Waterway E-70."
- Revitalization of the Vistula–Oder Waterway as an Opportunity for the Region's Economy, Vol. I, edited by Zygmunt Babiński. Marshal's Office of the Kuyavian-Pomeranian Voivodeship; Institute of Geography, Kazimierz Wielki University, Bydgoszcz 2008.
- Natural and Cultural Resources of the Vistula–Oder Waterway, edited by Danuta Szumińska. Marshal's Office of the Kuyavian-Pomeranian Voivodeship; Institute of Geography, Kazimierz Wielki University, Bydgoszcz 2008.
- Revitalization of the Vistula–Oder Waterway as an Opportunity for the Region's Economy, Vol. III, edited by Zygmunt Babiński. Marshal's Office of the Kuyavian-Pomeranian Voivodeship; Institute of Geography, Kazimierz Wielki University, Bydgoszcz 2009.
