= Trzebiechów Palace =

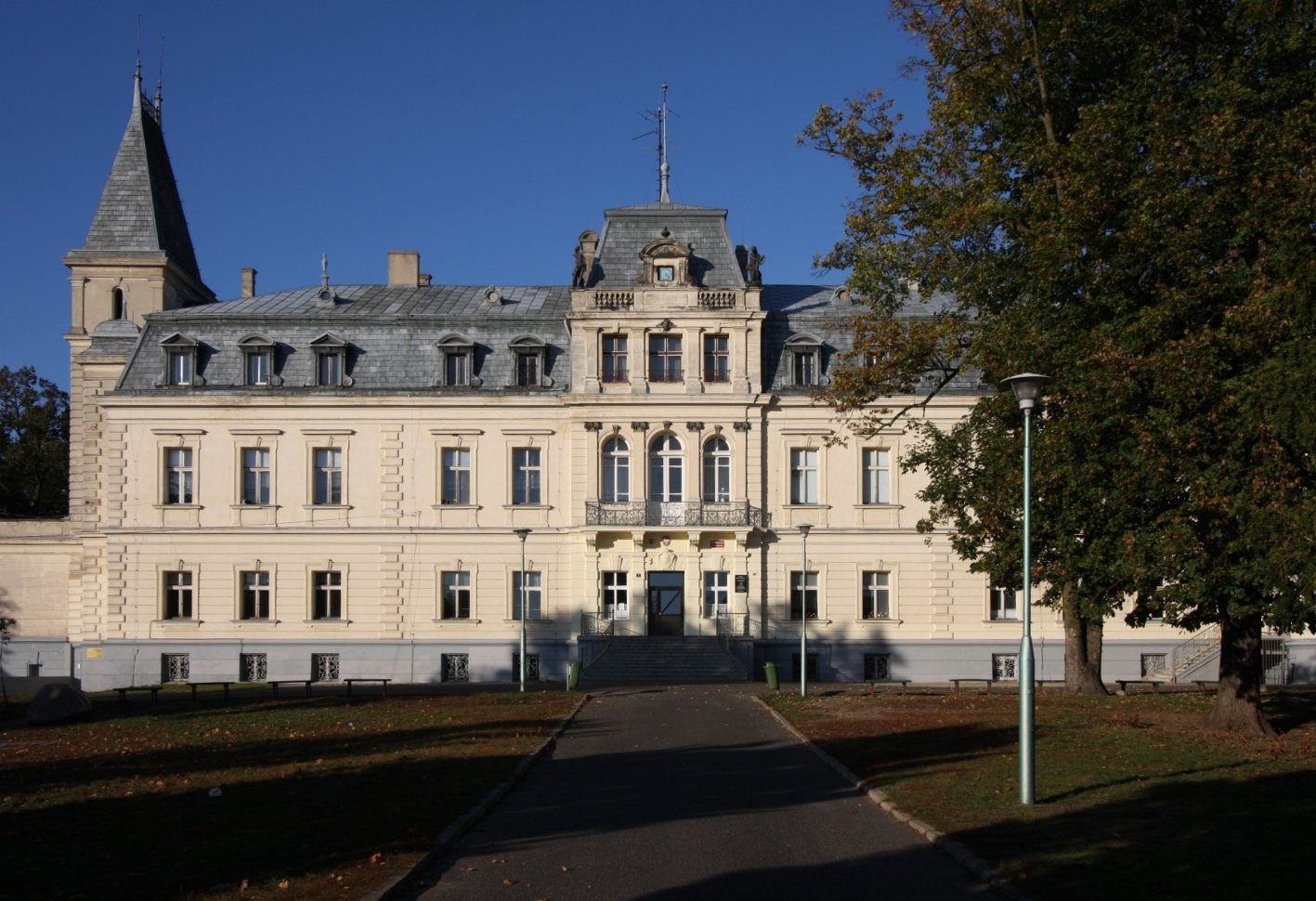
- Facade

General information
- Address: Trzebiechów, Zielona Góra County, Poland
- Coordinates: 52°01′29″N 15°44′08″E

Trzebiechów Palace (Polish: Pałac w Trzebiechowie; German: Schloss Trebschen) is a palace in Trzebiechów in the Lubusz Voivodeship in western Poland.

== History ==
Trzebiechów was first mentioned in 1308 in a document issued by the Bishop of Lebus Frederick I; at that time it belonged to the Diocese of Poznań. In 1442, the Trzebiechów estate, together with the Podlegórz estate, passed to the noble Troschke family, who had a residence built there. The family's ancestral home included Trzebiechów and Swarzynice. In the 17th and 18th centuries, many Protestant religious refugees came to the village.

=== Reuss-Köstritz ownership ===
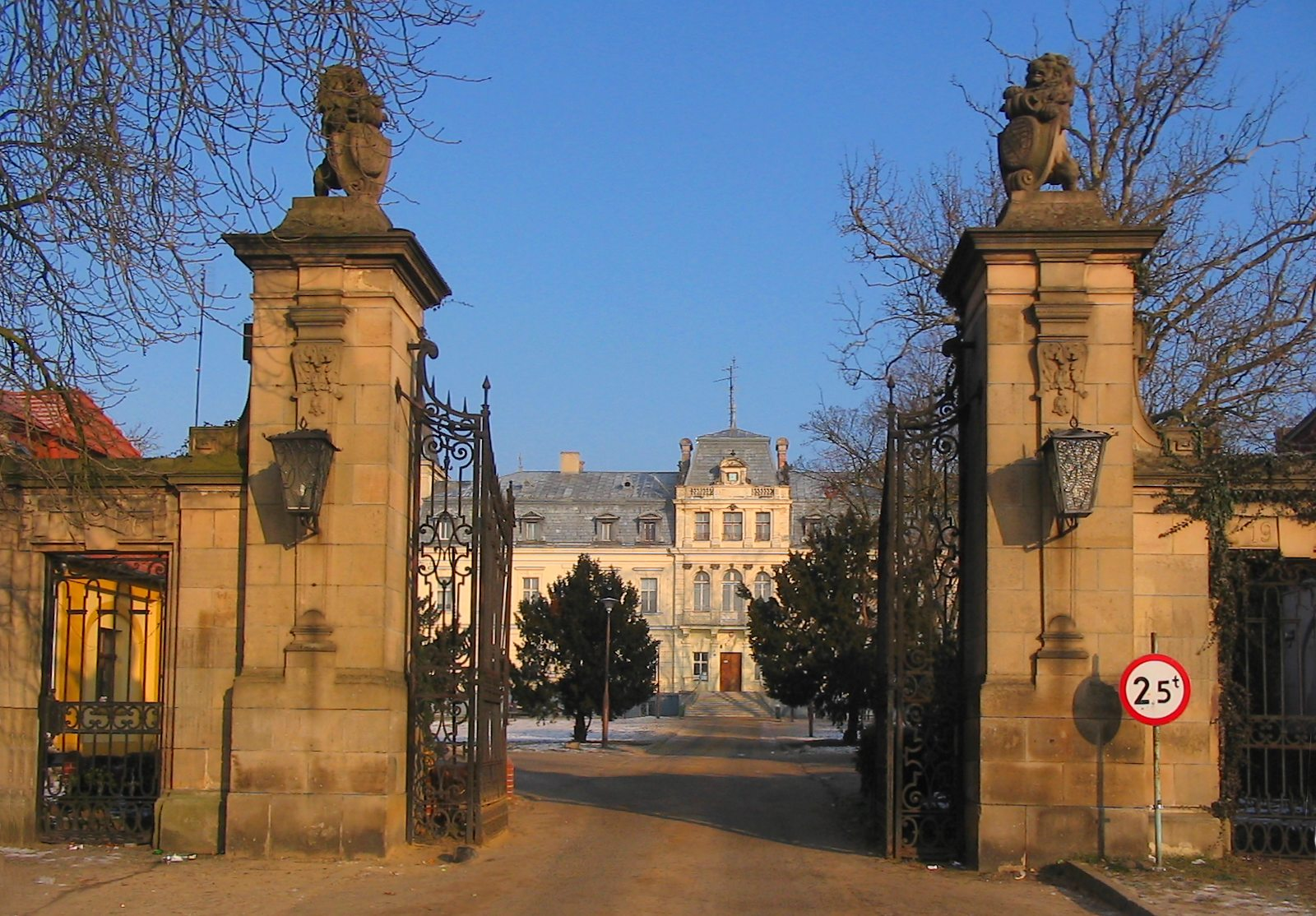
Entrance gate, 2006

In the 18th century, today's castle was built and the village was expanded into a town. In 1765 Trebschen and Radowice came to the Princes of Reuss-Köstritz, represented by Prince (since 1817) Heinrich XLIV, Count Reuss, Lord of Plauen, son of Imperial Count Reuss, High Court Marshal, Real Secret Budget and War Minister and Director of the Kurmärkische Landschaft. Henry XLIV Count Reuss-Köstritz was born in Berlin in 1753 and died in Trebschen in 1832.

He was followed in the property by Heinrich LXIII, Prince Reuss of Köstritz. His son Heinrich VII, Prince Reuss of Köstritz owned the property in 1861. By 1880, the manor comprised 404-hectare (1,000-acre), including a brickworks. At that time it was leased to an Ober-Antmann while Prince Reuss lived in Vienna. Before the great economic crisis, the entire property of the existing family fidei commission included the Trebschen manor with 419-hectare (1,040-acre), of which 140-hectare (350-acre) were leased in individual plots, as well as the Vorwerke Waldhof with 140-hectare (350-acre) and Luisenthal with 77-hectare (190-acre), which were also leased. Other manors include Radewitsch with 537-hectare (1,330-acre), Padligar 535-hectare (1,320-acre) with Vorwerk Minettenberg and Ostritz with 662-hectare (1,640-acre). After Prince Reuss' death there in 1902, his eldest son, Heinrich XXXII, Prince Reuss of Köstritz, inherited the manor. He was married to Princess Marie Adelheid of Lippe in 1920. In 1929 a big wedding took place at Trebschen Castle; the house's daughter, Sophie Renate, married her cousin Prince Heinrich XXXIV and the couple lived in Stonsdorf Castle in the Giant Mountains. Prince Heinrich XXXII lived in Trebschen Castle around 1929 and also, partly in Munich, with his brother Prince Heinrich XXXIII and his two children, his mother Princess Victoria Margaret of Prussia, who died in 1923.

=== Later owners ===
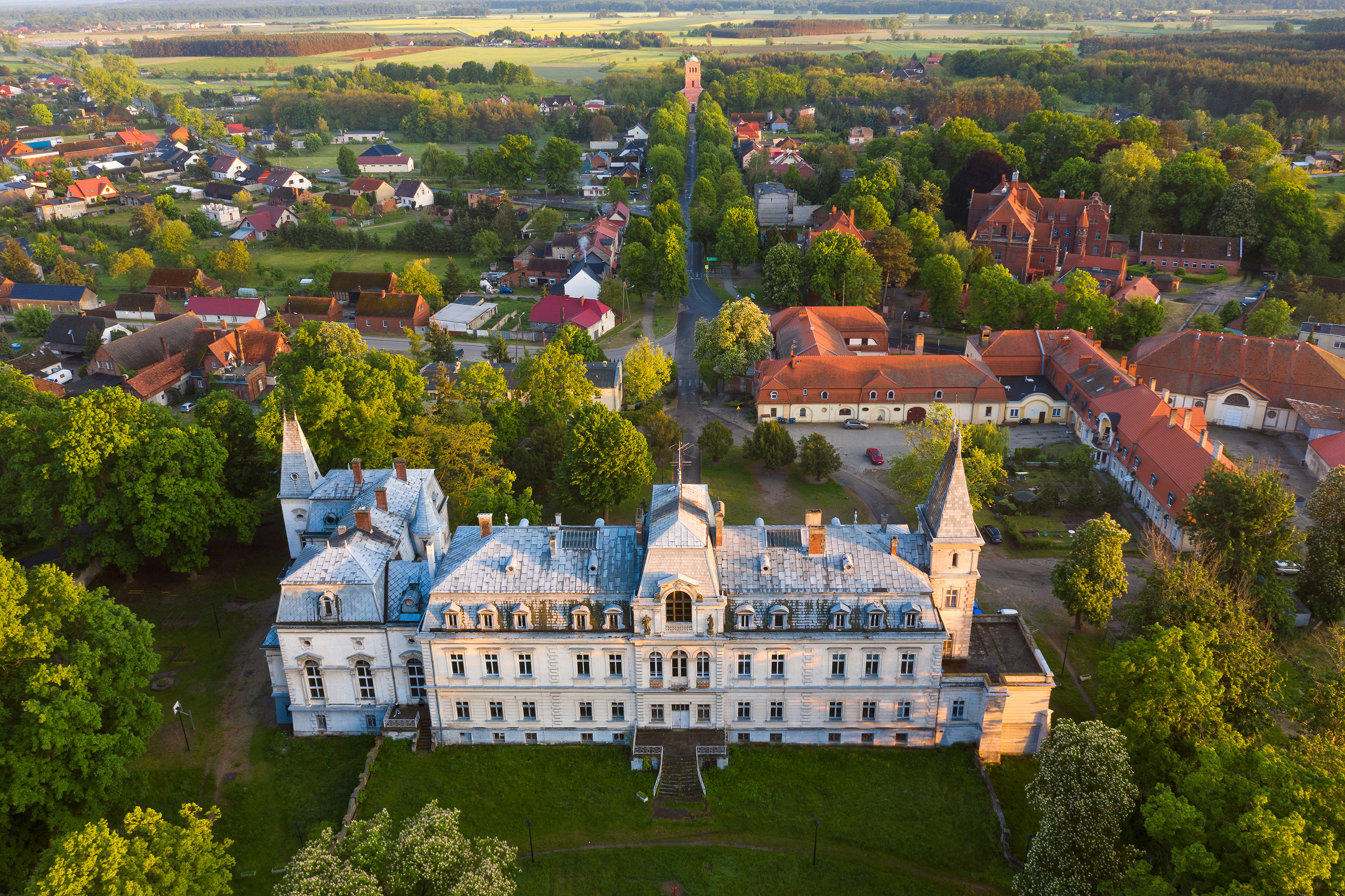
Aerial view, 2021

In 1943, Trebschen was purchased by Prince Adolf zu Bentheim-Tecklenburg, whose aunt Margarethe was Countess Bentheim (née Princess Reuss).

Following World War II, the region fell to the People's Republic of Poland in 1945. Today a school is operated in the castle.
