= Hutka (disambiguation) =

Hutka is a village in north-east Slovakia.

Hutka may also refer to the following villages:

- Hutka, Greater Poland Voivodeship (west-central Poland)
- Hutka, Silesian Voivodeship (south Poland)

== See also ==
- Huťka
