= Gębice =

Gębice may refer to the following places in Poland:

- Gębice, Lower Silesian Voivodeship (south-west Poland)
- Gębice, Kuyavian-Pomeranian Voivodeship (north-central Poland)
- Gębice, Czarnków-Trzcianka County in Greater Poland Voivodeship (west-central Poland)
- Gębice, Gostyń County in Greater Poland Voivodeship (west-central Poland)
- Gębice, Gmina Gubin, Krosno County in Lubusz Voivodeship (west Poland)
- Gębice, Zielona Góra County in Lubusz Voivodeship (west Poland)
