= Voivodeship road 118 =

Road in Poland

Voivodeship Road 118
- Droga wojewódzka nr 118

Route information
- Maintained by Wielkopolski Zarząd Dróg Wojewódzkich
- Length: 4 km (2.5 mi)

Major junctions
- From: Średnica
- To: Nowe Dwory

Location
- Country: Poland
- Regions: Greater Poland Voivodeship

Highway system
- National roads in Poland; Voivodeship roads
← DW 117	→ DW 119

Voivodeship Road 118 (Polish: Droga wojewódzka nr 118, abbreviated DW 118) is a route in the Polish voivodeship roads network. The route links Średnica with Nowe Dwory.

== Important settlements along the route ==
- Średnica
- Zielonowo
- Nowe Dwory

== Route plan ==
km	Icon	Name	Crossed roads
x		Górnica	—
x		Jędrzejowo	—
0		Średnica	
4		Nowe Dwory	
x		Drezdenko	—
x		Kuźnica Czarnkowska	—
