= Voivodeship road 117 =

Road in Poland

Voivodeship Road 117
- Droga wojewódzka nr 117

Route information
- Maintained by Wielkopolski Zarząd Dróg Wojewódzkich
- Length: 10 km (6.2 mi)
- Existed: 2 August 2017–present

Major junctions
- From: DW 180
- To: Jędrzejewo

Location
- Country: Poland
- Regions: Greater Poland Voivodeship

Highway system
- National roads in Poland; Voivodeship roads
← DW 116	→ DW 118

Voivodeship road 117 (Polish: Droga wojewódzka nr 117, abbreviated DW 117) is a route in the Polish voivodeship roads network. The route links DW 180 with Jędrzejewo and was formerly DW 309 before 2017.

== Former route ==
DW 117 originally ran from Obrzycko to Ostroróg. This was downgraded to a powiat road on 23 December 2015.

== Important settlements along the route ==
- Górnica
- Biernatowo
- Średnica
- Jędrzejewo

== Route plan ==
km	Icon	Name	Crossed roads
x		Piotrowo	—
x		Szamotuły	—
0		Obrzycko	
0		Level crossing for the Railway Line Szamotuły - Wronki	—
10		Ostroróg	
x		Wronki	—
x		Przeźmierowo	—
