= Goraj-Zamek =

- Settlement
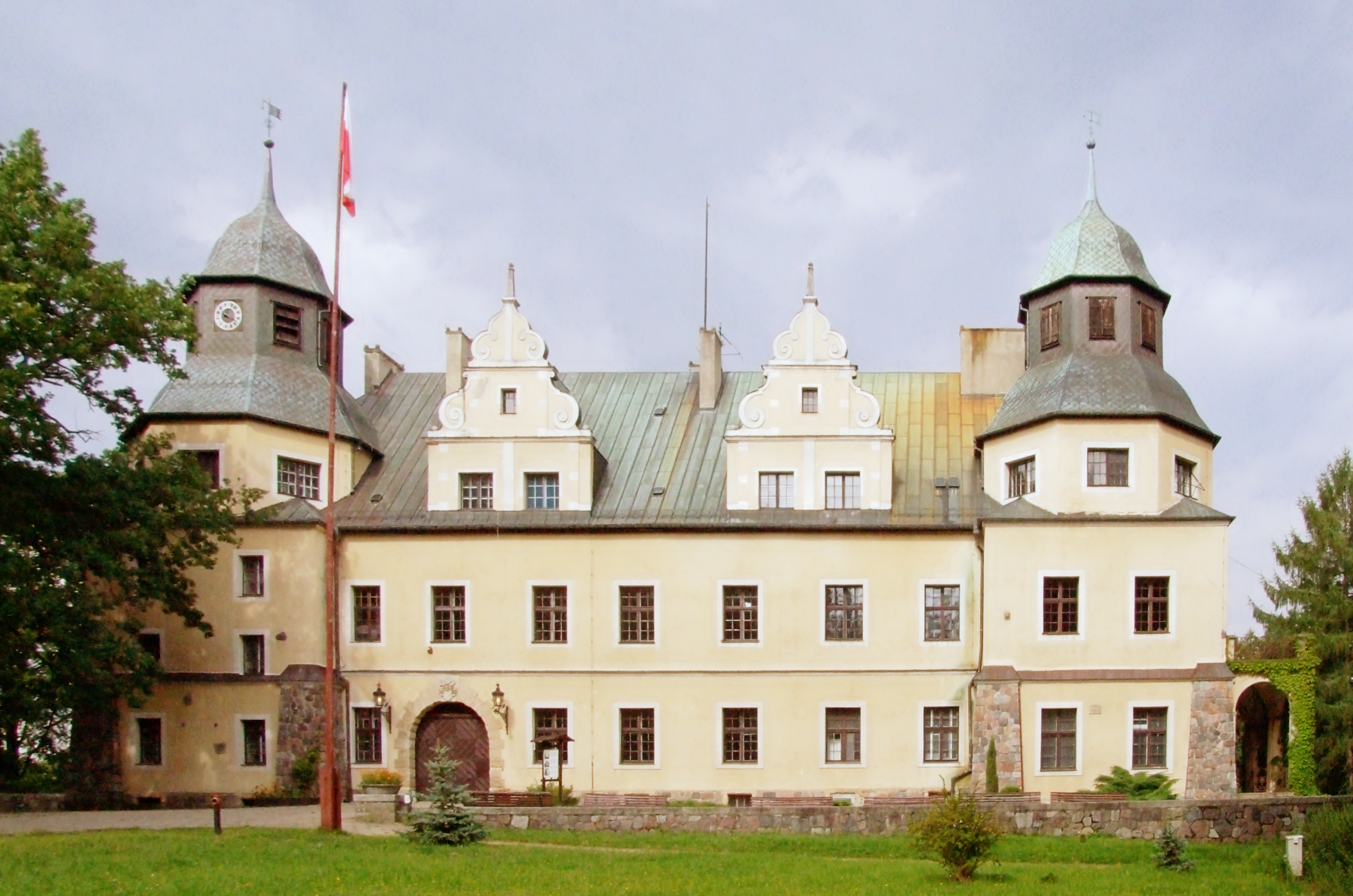
- Goraj palace

- Location within Poland
- Coordinates: 52°52′28″N 16°29′39″E
- Country: Poland
- Voivodeship: Greater Poland
- County: Czarnków-Trzcianka
- Gmina: Czarnków

Goraj-Zamek [ˈɡɔrai̯ ˈzamɛk] is a settlement in the administrative district of Gmina Czarnków, within Czarnków-Trzcianka County, Greater Poland Voivodeship, in west-central Poland.

Location and Origin

The Goraj-Zamek (Castle), constructed between the years 1909 and 1912, is located at the edge of the Noteć Forest in Szwajcaria Czarnkowska, Poland. It was built by Count Wilhelm Bolko Emanuel von Hochberg, a member of one of the oldest German families on an estate owned by the Prince of Pszczyna, Jan Henryk XI von Hochberg. The castle itself was inspired by the Varenholz Castle in Westphalia, Germany. The neo-Renaissance building reflects the architectural likes of early 20th-century European aristocracy. The estate spanned approximately 12,000 hectares, one of the largest in Greater Poland held by a German owner. The complex is located away from the main village buildings, on the western side of the railway line connecting Czarnków and the Bzowo-Goraj station, as well as the road linking Czarnków, Pianówka, and Goraj. An asphalt road leads directly from the main road to the palace grounds. The complex comprises the palace at its center, surrounded by a landscaped park. To the northwest of the palace lies a half-timbered building, historically used as a stable and riding school and now repurposed as a gymnasium and teaching rooms. Nearby, there is a small half-timbered structure that once served as a fire station and now functions as a forge, alongside a wooden drying room for timber. To the southwest of the palace, beyond a newer school building, is a half-timbered gardener’s house on an adjacent hill, currently used as housing for school employees.

Construction

The first known documents detailing the construction of the castle dated back to 1909 which were sent to Count Wilhelm from an architect appointed by the Prince of Pszczyna. These documents included a letter, hand-drawn sketches, and a more detailed outline of the planned riding school and horse stables. The plans and cost estimate are said to have been provided by a company based in Berlin,"Gradehand und Franke", and was set to construct the complex along with the nearby grounds.

The Exterior

The castle is a three-winged rectangular structure that includes a basement. The southeast and southwest wings are two-story, while the shorter northwest wing is three-story. The palace is roofed with multi-slope structures along with two massive towers. Each tower has a square base transitioning into an octagonal upper story, topped with two-tiered cupolas. The tower walls protrude slightly from the main palace walls, and their corners are enforced with stone. The building was constructed using brick and plaster for the walls. Certain parts of the stone base and architectural details were left unplastered. Originally, the roofs were covered with tiles but have since been replaced with copper sheeting. The palace interiors feature reinforced concrete ceilings. The palace elevations are sand-colored, divided by a profiled cornice. Windows are rectangular, framed with simple, lighter bands. The front elevation features 11 axes, with an asymmetrically placed, semicircular gate framed by stone ashlars. The Hochberg coat of arms is displayed at the gate. A clock is installed on the northwest tower. The southeast elevation has 10 axes and includes an arcaded loggia by the southeast tower, topped with a balcony. Four single-axis extensions are visible in the roofline. The northwest elevation has 5 axes, with a rectangular side entrance in the tower wall. Similar architectural elements can be seen on the elevations facing the inner courtyard, including a small balcony with a cast-iron balustrade in the southeast wing.

The Interior

In 1911, the design for the interior of the castle was completed by another Berlin based company called "Paulus und Lilloe". The interior layout of each wing features a two-bay design. Access to the palace is through a passageway leading to a spacious vestibule. The ground floor housed guest rooms, while the first floor included a chapel, a ballroom, a dining room with an adjacent sideboard room, a drawing room, and the owners' private apartments. Several rooms retain elements of original Rococo and Neo-Rococo furnishings, such as parquet floors, wainscoting, stucco ceiling decorations, fireplaces, mirrors, and paintings. Included amenities inside the complex were considered modern at the time: central heating, three lifts, and a central vacuum cleaner. The palace interiors were reinforced by concrete ceilings.

The Grounds

Nearby the Goraj Castle many facilities were established such as stables, a riding school, fire brigade structures, and buildings for gardening and forestry management. Before the castle's construction, the Hochbergs had resided in a wooden manor in Zdroje (now Gniewomierz), which later became a hunting lodge. The estate's cash flow was primarily upheld by agriculture and forestry. There was a distillery that was located in Ciszków with timber that was transported by a narrow-gauge railway. The Hochbergs also engaged in brown coal mining near Krucz and implemented reforestation efforts between 1870 and 1872 to restore forested areas damaged by logging and pest infestations. The estate was divided into three main forest districts, Krucz, Klempicz, and Goraj, each subdivided into nine smaller districts.

Hochberg Family

Count Wilhelm, born on December 15, 1886, in Pszczyna, inherited the Goray estates in 1907. He married Zofia Anna Maria von Arnim, and they had three children: Elizabeth Ferdynanda, John Wilhelm Bernard, and Anna Maria. Count Jan Henryk XI von Hochberg, Prince of Pszczyna, purchased the Goray manor from Count Dzieduszycki of Wronki and received additional land from Ignacy Goetzendorf-Grabowski. The Hochberg family were big on hunting, a tradition they brought to the Goraj Castle. Along with their passion for hunting, the family also bred deer. The deer breeding stables were set up within the surrounding Noteć Forest and were overseen by Jan Targiel and Józef Kołoch. The castle was frequently visited by German nobility.

World War II and Aftermath

Following Count Wilhelm's death, his son, Jan Wilhelm Bernard von Hochberg, inherited Goraj Castle and continued the family’s hunting legacy. He was fatally shot by a German soldier on January 22, 1945 when he was a part of the German army during World War II. On the same day, his mother and his sisters evacuated Goraj Castle due to the advancing Soviet forces and eventually settled in Lindau, Germany.

Later Visits and Legacy

Anna Maria returned to Goraj on three occasions in 1977, 1986, and 1991 with her daughter, Katarzyna von Vegesack, and other family members. The local school maintains contact with Katarzyna, who last visited Goraj during the castle’s centennial celebration. Today the Goraj Castle stands as a historical testament to the Hochberg family’s influence in the region
