= Białężyn =

Białężyn refers to the following places in Poland:

- Białężyn, Czarnków-Trzcianka County
- Białężyn, Poznań County
