= Voivodeship road 116 =

Road in Poland

Voivodeship Road 116
- Droga wojewódzka nr 116

Route information
- Maintained by Wielkopolski Zarząd Dróg Wojewódzkich
- Length: 8 km (5.0 mi)

Location
- Country: Poland
- Regions: Greater Poland Voivodeship

Highway system
- National roads in Poland; Voivodeship roads
← DW 115	→ DW 117

Voivodeship road 116 (Polish: Droga wojewódzka nr 116, abbreviated DW 116) is a route in the Polish voivodeship roads network. The route links Nojewo with the cross road of the Voivodeship Road 184 and Voivodeship Road 186 near Dobrojewo.

== Route plan ==
km	Icon	Name	Crossed roads
0		Nojewo	—
4		Level crossing for the Railway Line Szamotuły - Międzychód	—
8		—	
