= Mikołajewo =

Mikołajewo may refer to the following places:

- Mikołajewo, Czarnków-Trzcianka County in Greater Poland Voivodeship (west-central Poland)
- Mikołajewo, Masovian Voivodeship (east-central Poland)
- Mikołajewo, Podlaskie Voivodeship (north-east Poland)
- Mikołajewo, Wągrowiec County in Greater Poland Voivodeship (west-central Poland)
- Mikołajewo, Warmian-Masurian Voivodeship (north Poland)
