= Kreis Czarnikau =

Location of the Czarnikau district in the Province of Posen

Kreis Czarnikau was one of many Kreise (counties) in Regierungsbezirk Bromberg, in the Prussian Province of Posen. It existed from 1816 to 1920 and had its capital at Czarnikau. Today, the area of this district belongs to Poland and is part of the Greater Poland Voivodeship.

== History ==
The district area became part of Prussia after the First Partition of Poland in 1772. The district of Czarnikau was formed on 1 July 1816. On 1 January 1818 the new district of Chodziesen (later renamed Kolmar in Posen) was formed from the eastern part of the Czarnikau district. On 1 October 1887 the new Filehne district was formed from the western part of the Czarnikau district.

By the Treaty of Versailles, the district was divided on 10 January 1920. The area south of the Netze river became part of Poland. The area north of the Netze remained in Germany and became part of the Netzekreis in the new province of Grenzmark Posen-West Prussia.

== Demographics ==
Northern part of Kreis Czarnikau incorporated into Netzekreis

The Czarnikau district had a German majority population and a large Polish minority.

Ethnolinguistic structure of Kreis Czarnikau
Year	Population	German		Polish / Bilingual	
1890	38,678	28,604	74.0%	10,070	26.0%
1900	39,585	28,672	72.4%	10,911	27.6%
1905	41,127	29,273	71.2%	11,851	28.8%
1910	42,287	30,016	71.0%	12,206	28.9%

== Table of Standesämter ==
"Standesamt" is the German name of the local civil registration offices which were established in October 1874 soon after the German Empire was formed. Births, marriages and deaths were recorded. Previously, only the church records were used for Christians.

Standesamt	Polish name
Behle	Biała
Bismarckshöhe	Stajkowo
Czarnikau	Czarnków
Hammer	Kuźnica Czarnkowska
Runau	Runowo
Sarben	Sarbia
Schönlanke	Trzcianka
Stieglitz	Siedlisko
