= Mieszkowo =

Mieszkowo may refer to the following places:

- Mieszkowo, Lubusz Voivodeship (west Poland)
- Mieszkowo, Masovian Voivodeship (east-central Poland)
- Mieszkowo, West Pomeranian Voivodeship (north-west Poland)
