= Gmina Czarnków =

Gmina Czarnków Czarnków Commune
- Gmina
- Coat of arms
- Interactive map of Gmina Czarnków
- Coordinates (Czarnków): 52°54′N 16°34′E
- Country: Poland
- Voivodeship: Greater Poland
- County: Czarnków-Trzcianka
- Seat: Czarnków

Area
  - Total: 347.78 km^{2} (134.28 sq mi)

Population (2006)
  - Total: 10,887
  - Density: 31.304/km^{2} (81.078/sq mi)
- Website: http://www.czarnkowgmina.pl/

Gmina Czarnków is a rural gmina (administrative district) in Czarnków-Trzcianka County, Greater Poland Voivodeship, in west-central Poland. Its seat is the town of Czarnków, although the town is not part of the territory of the gmina.

The gmina covers an area of 347.78 square kilometres (134.3 sq mi), and as of 2006 its total population is 10,887.

== Villages ==
Gmina Czarnków contains the villages and settlements of Białężyn, Brzeźno, Bukowiec, Ciążyń, Ciszkowo, Gajewo, Gębice, Gębiczyn, Góra nad Notecią, Goraj-Zamek, Grzępy, Huta, Hutka, Jędrzejewo, Komorzewo, Kuźnica Czarnkowska, Marunowo, Mikołajewo, Paliszewo, Pianówka, Radolinek, Radosiew, Romanowo Dolne, Romanowo Górne, Sarbia, Sarbka, Śmieszkowo, Sobolewo, Średnica, Walkowice and Zofiowo.

== Neighbouring gminas ==
Gmina Czarnków is bordered by the town of Czarnków and by the gminas of Budzyń, Chodzież, Lubasz, Połajewo, Ryczywół, Trzcianka, Ujście and Wieleń.
