= Radolinek =

- Village
- Location within Poland
- Coordinates: 52°58′N 16°33′E
- Country: Poland
- Voivodeship: Greater Poland
- County: Czarnków-Trzcianka
- Gmina: Czarnków
- Population (approx.): 170

Radolinek [radɔˈlinɛk] is a village in the administrative district of Gmina Czarnków, within Czarnków-Trzcianka County, Greater Poland Voivodeship, in west-central Poland.

The village has an approximate population of 170.
