= Ledno =

- Village
- Location within Poland
- Coordinates: 51°59′N 15°42′E
- Country: Poland
- Voivodeship: Lubusz
- County: Zielona Góra
- Gmina: Trzebiechów

Ledno [ˈlɛdnɔ] is a village in the administrative district of Gmina Trzebiechów, within Zielona Góra County, Lubusz Voivodeship, in western Poland.
