= Trzcianka =

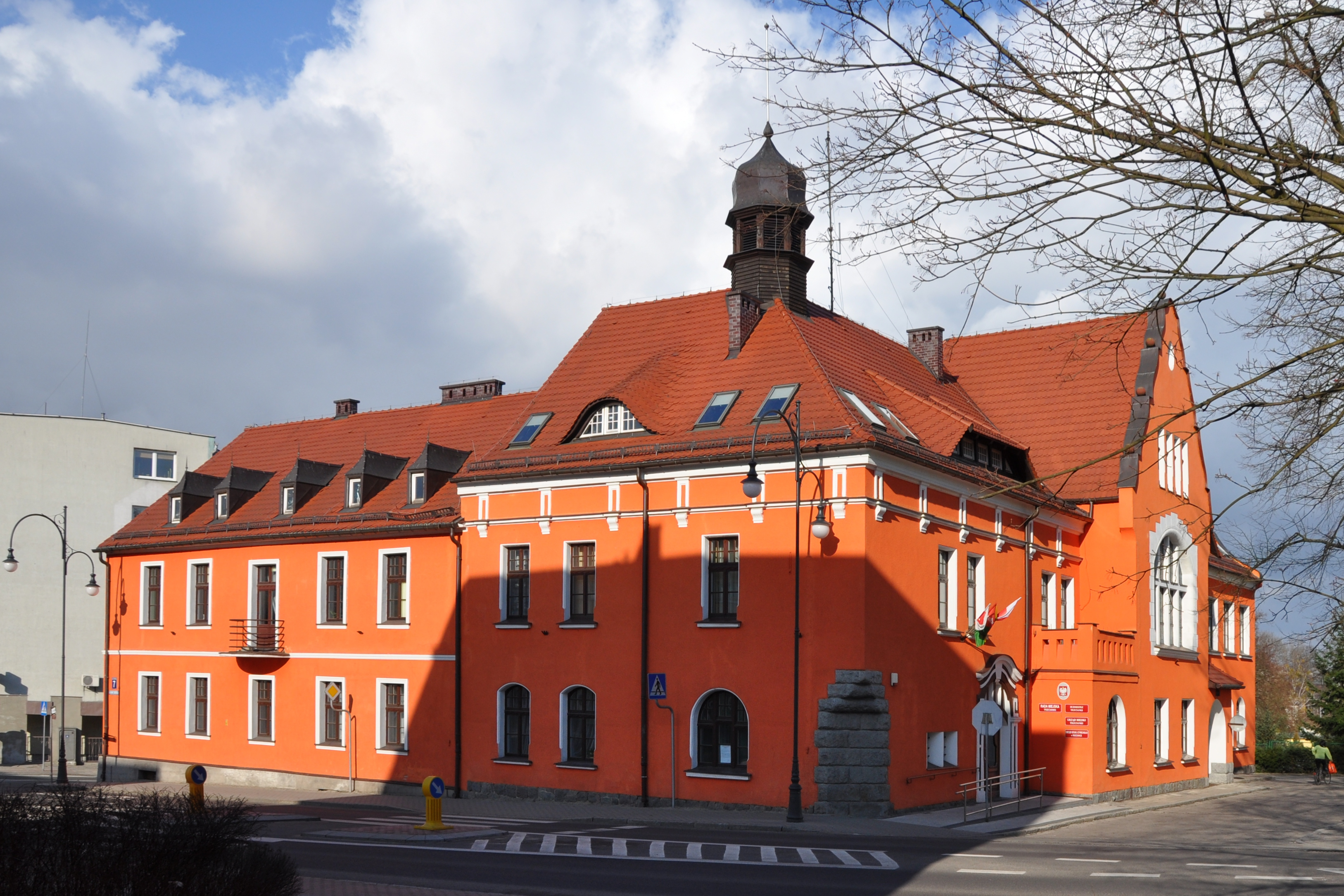
- Town hall

- Flag Coat of arms

- Location within Poland
- Coordinates: 53°3′N 16°28′E
- Country: Poland
- Voivodeship: Greater Poland
- County: Czarnków-Trzcianka
- Gmina: Trzcianka
- Founded: 13th century
- First mentioned: 1245
- Town rights: 1731

Area
  - Total: 18.25 km^{2} (7.05 sq mi)

Population (2006)
  - Total: 16,756
  - Density: 918.1/km^{2} (2,378/sq mi)
- Time zone: UTC+1 (CET)
  - Summer (DST): UTC+2 (CEST)
- Postal code: 64-980
- Vehicle registration: PCT
- Website: http://www.trzcianka.pl

Trzcianka ([ˈtʂt͡ɕaŋka]; German: Schönlanke) is a town in the Greater Poland region in northwestern Poland, in the Czarnków-Trzcianka County, in the Greater Poland Voivodeship. In May 2007, Trzcianka had 17,131 inhabitants. Trzcianka is located on the Trzcianka River, and three lakes, Sarcze, Okunie and Długie, are located within the town limits.

== History ==
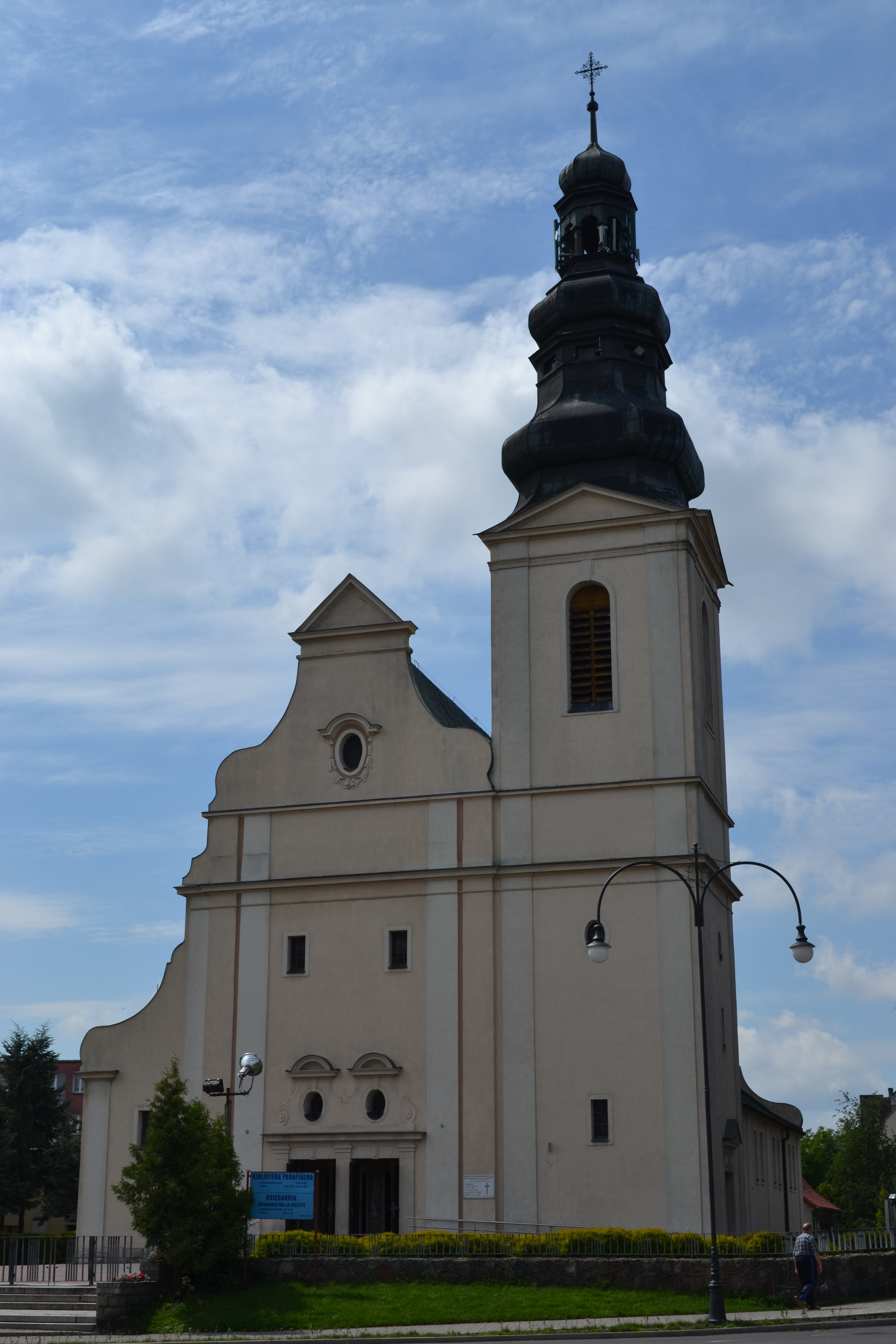
Baroque Revival Church of St. John the Baptist

The settlement, initially named Rozdróżka, was probably founded in the 13th century. It was located on a trade route which connected Poznań and Kołobrzeg. Rozdróżka was mentioned in a document from 1245, when Duke Boleslaus V of Poland gave the land in the Noteć river valley, along with three villages (Biała, Gulcz, and Rozdróżka) to a Polish nobleman named Sędziwój of Czarnków. The new name of these three combined villages was Trzciana Łąka, as it appeared for the first time in 1565, and it was subsequently changed to Trzcianka in the 17th century.

Trzciana Łąka was a private village of Polish nobility, administratively located in the Poznań County in the Poznań Voivodeship in the Greater Poland Province of the Polish Crown, and in the 17th century it became a settlement of weavers and clothiers. It was owned by the Gembicki family, thanks to whom it developed, and in 1679 Andrzej Gembicki referred to it as a town. In 1671 Polish King Michał Korybut Wiśniowiecki issued a privilege which established new annual fairs in Trzcianka. It was granted town rights by King Augustus II the Strong in 1731. In the mid-18th century it was owned by the magnate Stanisław Poniatowski, father of the last Polish King Stanisław August Poniatowski, and the Poniatowskis' Ciołek coat of arms has been the town's coat of arms since. In the 18th century, Trzcianka was one of the leading clothmaking centers in Greater Poland, however, after the late 18th century Partitions of Poland and the annexation of the town by Prussia in 1772, the local economy collapsed.

After the successful Greater Poland uprising of 1806, it was regained by Poles and included within the short-lived Duchy of Warsaw. In 1815, it was re-annexed by Prussia, and from 1871 it was also part of Germany and was known as Schönlanke. The Prussian Eastern Railway, inaugurated in 1851 brought an economic boom to the town. Schönlanke had belonged to the Czarnikau district in the Province of Posen until 1920, after which it became the seat of the newly established Netzekreis district in the Province of Posen-West Prussia.

In the final months of World War II, Soviet troops marching towards Berlin from the east entered the town on 27 January 1945. Around this time, about 500 people committed suicide. Following the war, the abandoned town was eventually restored to Poland, although with a Soviet-installed communist regime, which remained in power until the Fall of Communism in the 1980s. From 1975 to 1998, it was administratively located in the Piła Voivodeship. In August 1980, employees of local factories joined the nationwide anti-communist strikes, which led to the foundation of the "Solidarity" organization.

== Culture ==
There is a local historic museum (Muzeum Ziemi Nadnoteckiej) in Trzcianka.

== Cuisine ==
The officially protected traditional food originating from Trzcianka is kiełbasa swojska nadnotecka, a local type of kiełbasa (as designated by the Ministry of Agriculture and Rural Development of Poland).

== Notable people ==
- Michael Solomon Alexander, first Protestant Bishop of Jerusalem was born here
- Andrzej Aumiller (born 1947), Polish politician, and Member of Parliament was born here
- Krystian Feciuch (born 1989), Polish footballer
- Hubert Mickley (1918–1944), Wehrmacht officer
- Max Raphael (1889–1952), German-American art historian of art of the Upper Paleolithic
- Gustav Ferdinand Mehler (1835-1895), German mathematician

== Gallery ==
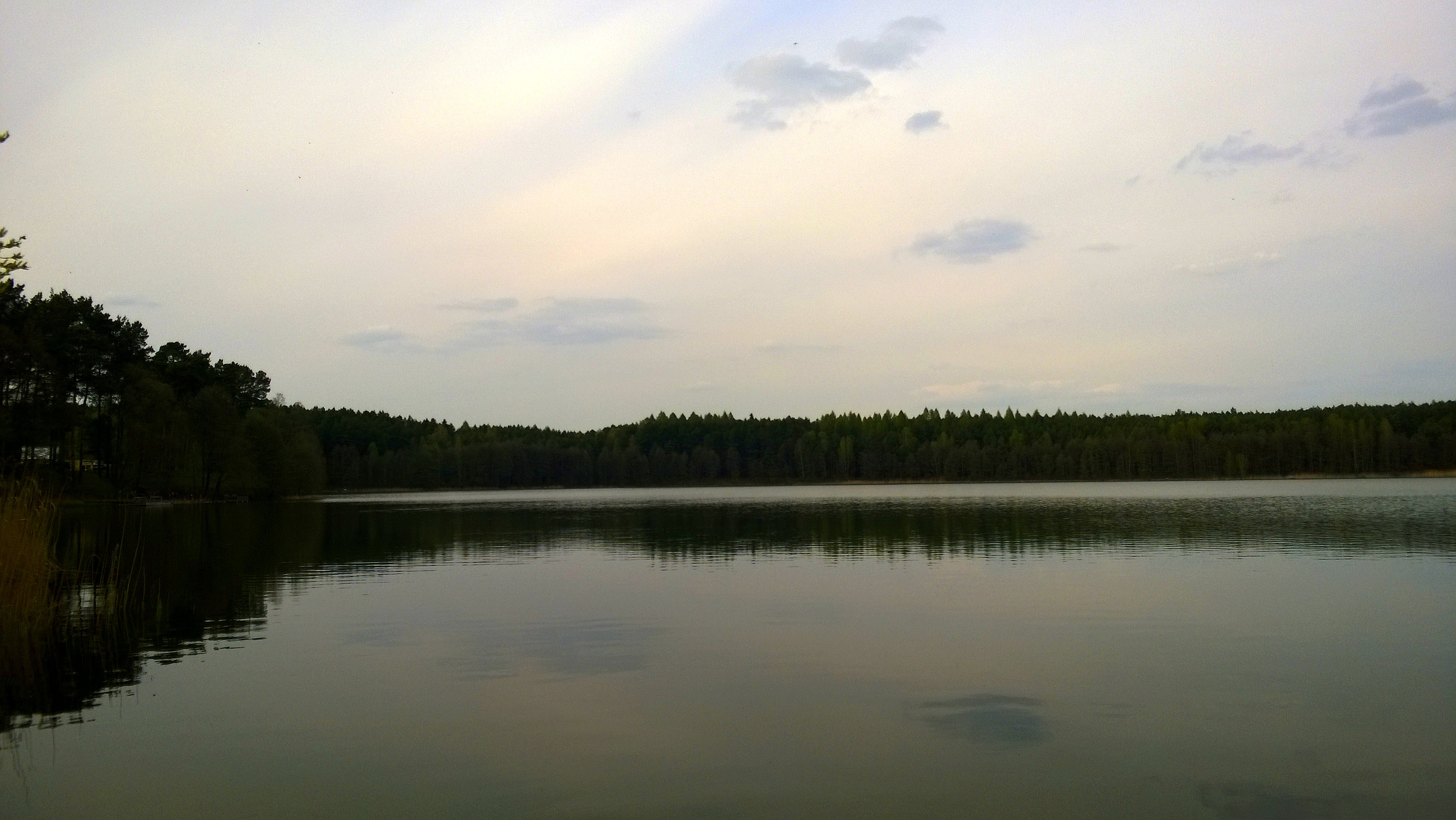
Długie Lake

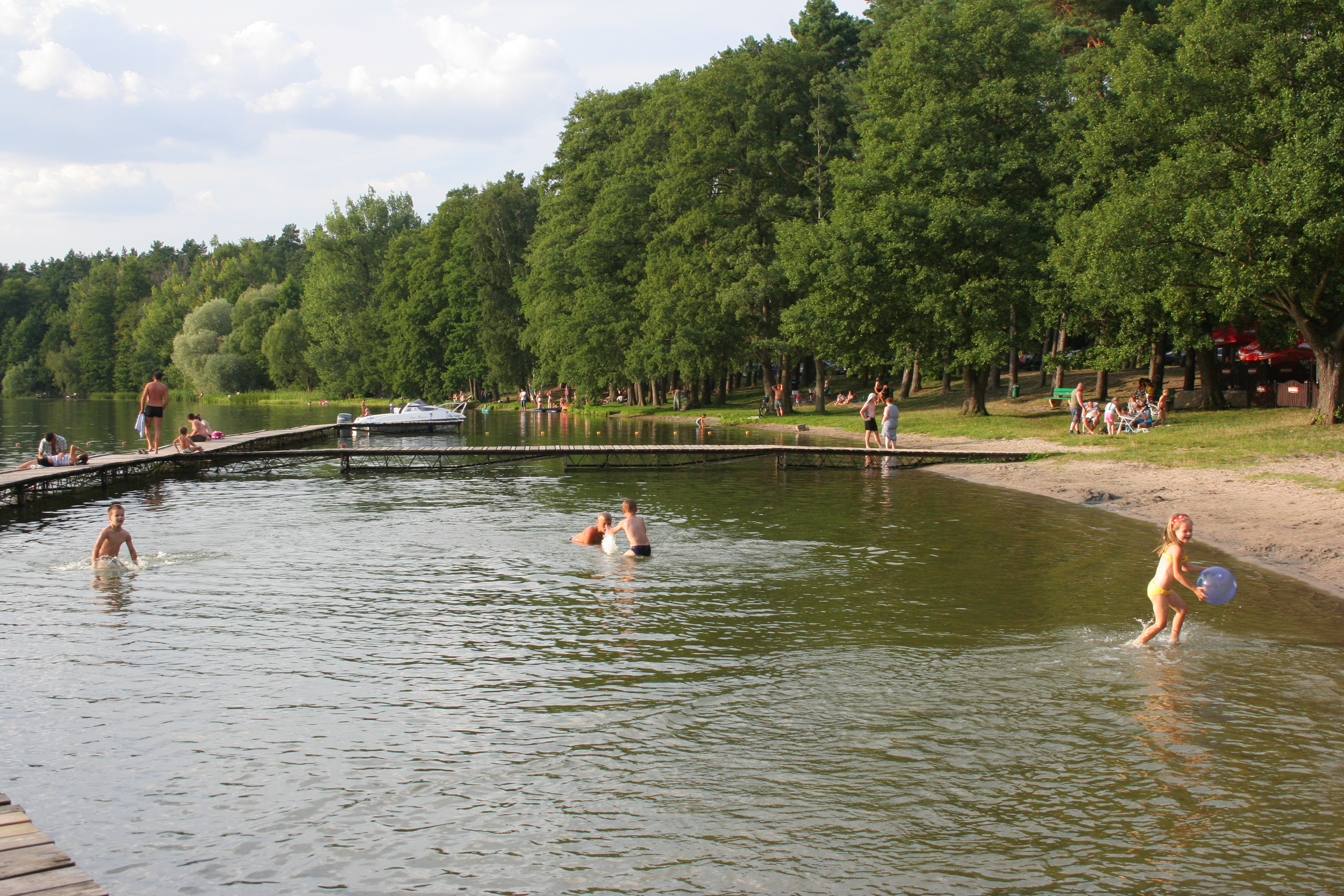
Beach on Sarcze Lake

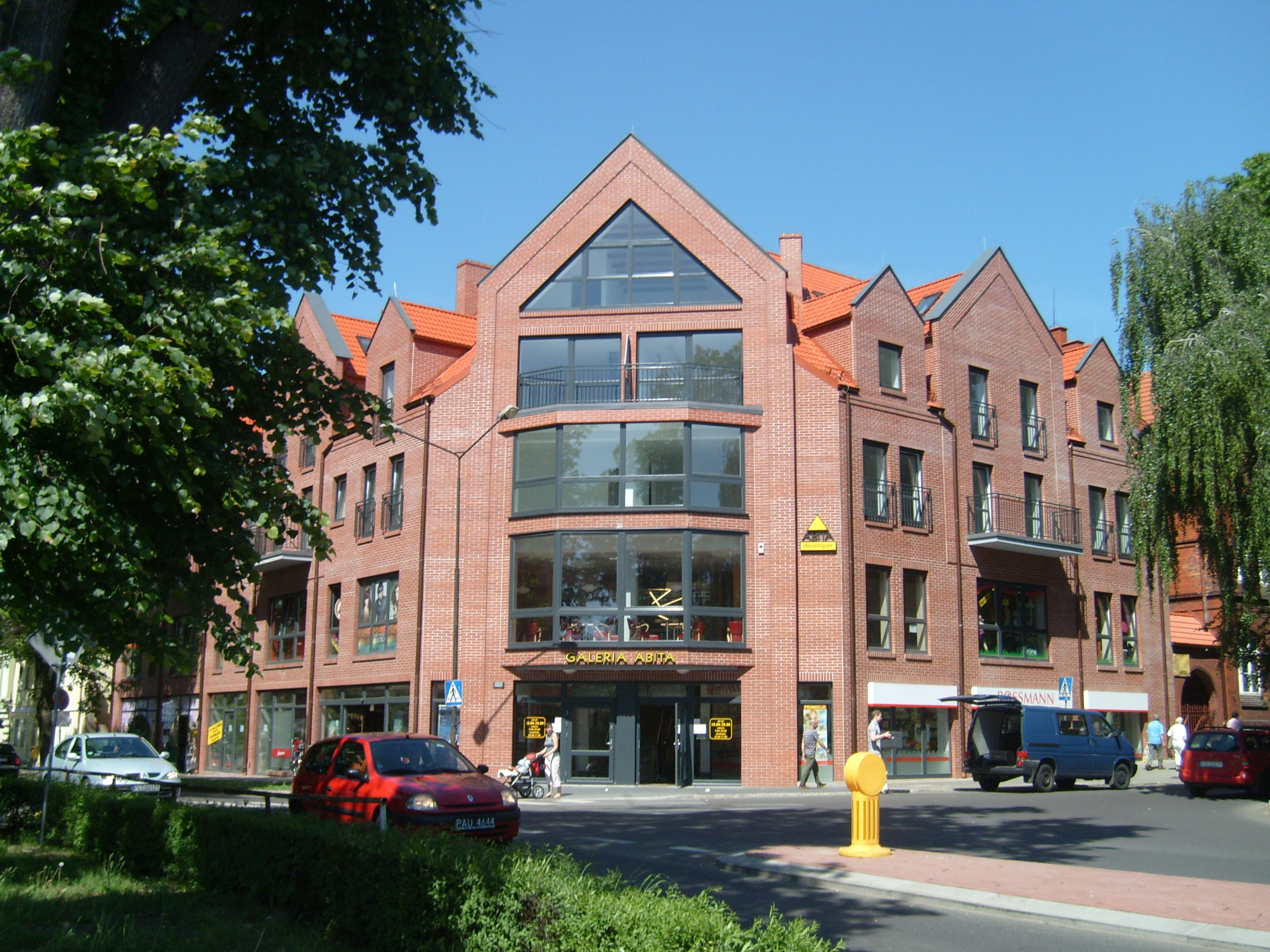
Shopping mall

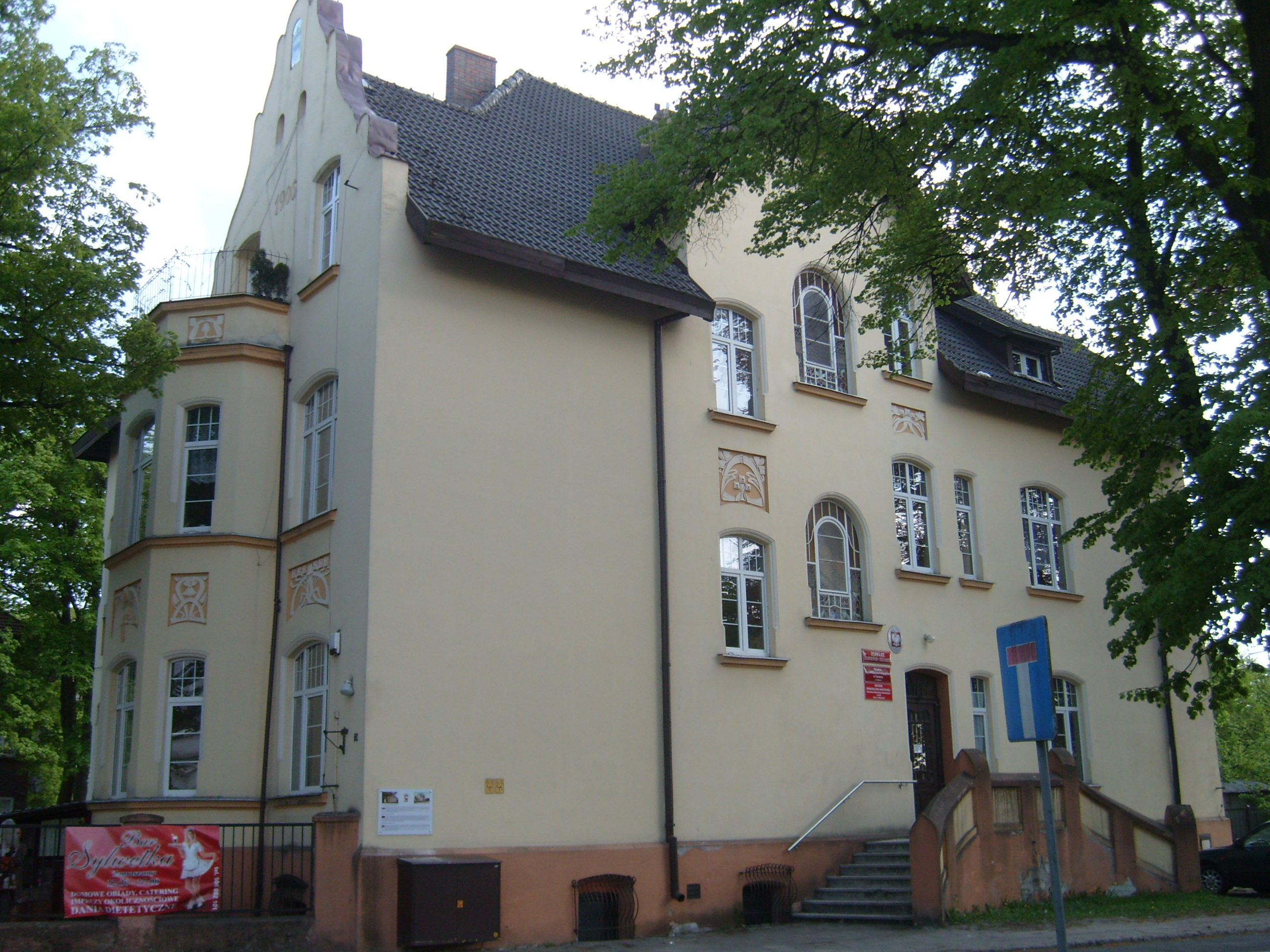
Art Nouveau Pedagogical Library

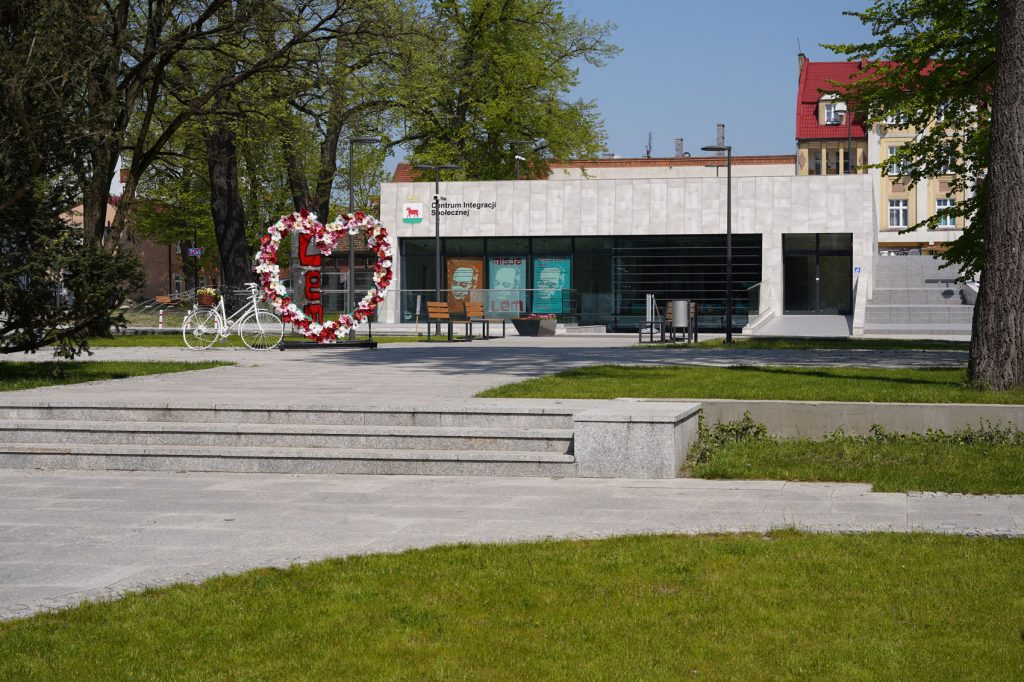
Social Integration Center
