= Krystian Feciuch =

Polish footballer

Personal information
- Date of birth: 18 April 1989 (age 37)
- Place of birth: Trzcianka, Poland
- Height: 1.82 m (6 ft 0 in)
- Position: Midfielder

Team information
- Current team: Lubuszanin Trzcianka
- Number: 8

Youth career
- Lubuszanin Trzcianka
- 2005–2007: Dyskobolia

Senior career*
| Years | Team | Apps | (Gls) |
| 2007–2008 | Dyskobolia | 0 | (0) |
| 2008–2009 | Pogoń Świebodzin | 13 | (1) |
| 2009–2011 | Polonia Warsaw | 3 | (0) |
| 2010 | → Stilon Gorzów (loan) | 8 | (0) |
| 2011 | → Lubuszanin Trzcianka (loan) | 14 | (1) |
| 2011–2012 | Miedź Legnica | 12 | (0) |
| 2012 | Pogoń Barlinek | 12 | (0) |
| 2012–2015 | Chojniczanka Chojnice | 89 | (2) |
| 2015–2017 | Odda FK | 26 | (1) |
| 2017–2020 | Lubuszanin Trzcianka | | |
| 2020–2022 | Noteć Czarnków | 27 | (8) |
| 2022– | Lubuszanin Trzcianka | 78 | (54) |
- * Club domestic league appearances and goals as of 17:42, 24 June 2025 (UTC)

Krystian Feciuch (born 18 April 1989) is a Polish footballer who plays as a midfielder for V liga Greater Poland club Lubuszanin Trzcianka.

== Career ==
Feciuch played for Lubuszanin Trzcianka and Dyskobolia U19 at the youth level. In 2007, he signed a professional contract with the latter and spent one season there. In 2008, he moved to Pogoń Świebodzin the on a one-year deal. He then spent three years with Polonia Warsaw, starting from 2008. In July 2010, he was sent to Stilon Gorzów Wielkopolski on a one-year loan. From there, he was loaned to Lubuszanin Trzcianka on a six-month deal. He returned to Polonia in June 2011 but left not long after to play for Miedź Legnica for one season. He spent time with Pogoń Barlinek in 2012 before Miedź traded him to Chojniczanka Chojnice on a two-year contract. He stayed there until 2015, his longest stay in a club without being loaned away, then joined Odda FK for two full seasons. He made his debut for them in July 2015. He returned to Lubuszanin Trzcianka to play between 2017 and 2020 and signed with Noteć Czarnków for the 2020–21 and 2021–22 seasons.

== Personal life ==
His brother Jarosław coaches for the Lubuszanin Trzcianka organization.

== Honours ==
Dyskobolia

- Ekstraklasa Cup: 2007–08

Lubuszanin Trzcianka

- IV liga Greater Poland North: 2016–17
- Polish Cup (Piła regionals): 2017–18, 2018–19

Noteć Czarnków

- V liga Greater Poland I: 2021–22
