= Huta, Czarnków-Trzcianka County =

Huta
- Village
- Location within Poland
- Coordinates: 52°52′N 16°40′E
- Country: Poland
- Voivodeship: Greater Poland
- County: Czarnków-Trzcianka
- Gmina: Czarnków

Huta [ˈxuta] is a village in the administrative district of Gmina Czarnków, within Czarnków-Trzcianka County, Greater Poland Voivodeship, in west-central Poland.
