= Gmina Trzebiechów =

Gmina Trzebiechów Trzebiechów Commune
- Gmina
- Coat of arms

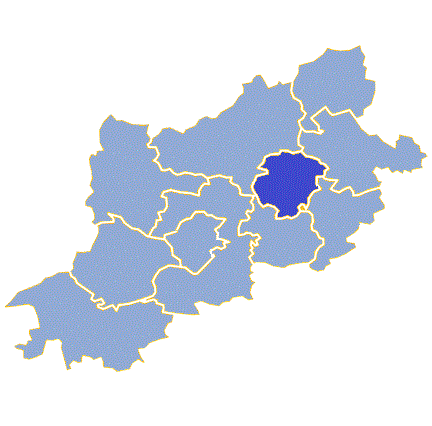
- Gmina Trzebiechów in Zielona Góra County

- Location within Poland
- Coordinates (Trzebiechów): 52°1′20″N 15°44′10″E
- Country: Poland
- Voivodeship: Lubusz
- County: Zielona Góra
- Seat: Trzebiechów

Area
  - Total: 80.99 km^{2} (31.27 sq mi)

Population (2019-06-30)
  - Total: 3,409
  - Density: 42.09/km^{2} (109.0/sq mi)
- Website: https://trzebiechow.pl/

Gmina Trzebiechów is a rural gmina (administrative district) in Zielona Góra County, Lubusz Voivodeship, in western Poland. Its seat is the village of Trzebiechów, which lies approximately 19 kilometres (12 mi) north-east of Zielona Góra.

The gmina covers an area of 80.99 square kilometres (31.3 sq mi), and as of 2019 its total population is 3,409.

== Villages ==
Gmina Trzebiechów contains the villages and settlements of Borek, Gębice, Głęboka, Głuchów, Ledno, Mieszkowo, Ostrzyce, Podlegórz, Radowice, Sadowo, Swarzynice and Trzebiechów.

== Neighbouring gminas ==
Gmina Trzebiechów is bordered by the gminas of Bojadła, Kargowa, Sulechów, Zabór and Zielona Góra.

== Twin towns – sister cities ==
Gmina Trzebiechów is twinned with:

- Schenkendöbern, Germany
