= Ciążyń =

- Village
- Location within Poland
- Coordinates: 52°51′3″N 16°39′47″E
- Country: Poland
- Voivodeship: Greater Poland
- County: Czarnków-Trzcianka
- Gmina: Czarnków
- Population: 100

Ciążyń [ˈt͡ɕɔ̃ʐɨɲ] is a village in the administrative district of Gmina Czarnków, within Czarnków-Trzcianka County, Greater Poland Voivodeship, in west-central Poland.
