= Krzyż Wielkopolski =

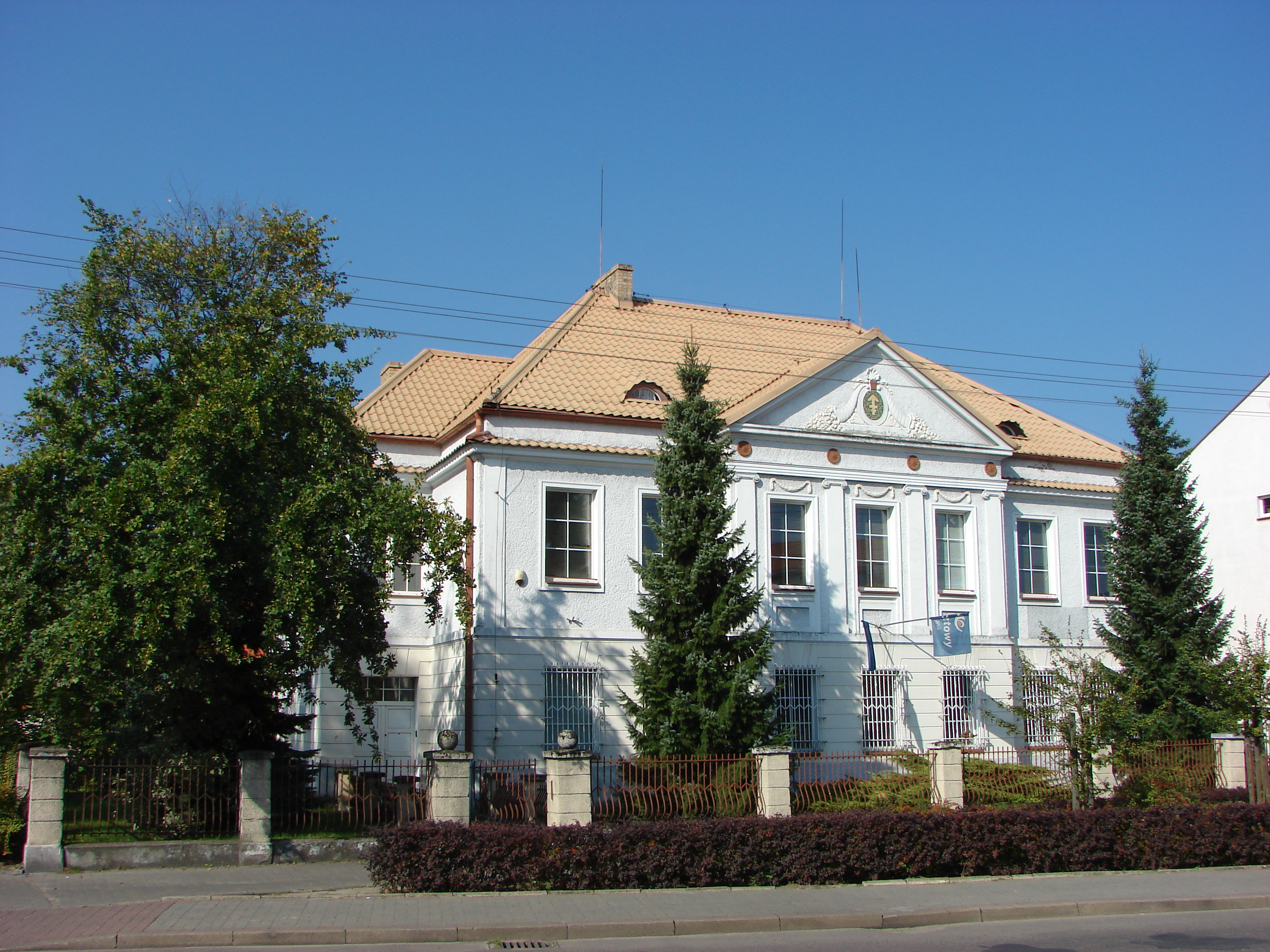
- The post office from the early 20th century

- Coat of arms

- Location within Poland
- Coordinates: 52°52′45″N 16°0′30″E
- Country: Poland
- Voivodeship: Greater Poland
- County: Czarnków-Trzcianka
- Gmina: Krzyż Wielkopolski
- Established: 18th century
- Town rights: 1936

Government
  - Mayor: Jolanta Korbik

Area
  - Total: 5.83 km^{2} (2.25 sq mi)

Population (2019)
  - Total: 6,176
  - Density: 1,070/km^{2} (2,800/sq mi)
- Time zone: UTC+1 (CET)
  - Summer (DST): UTC+2 (CEST)
- Postal code: 64-761
- Area code: +48 67
- Car plates: PCT
- Website: http://www.krzyz.pl

Krzyż Wielkopolski [ˈkʂɨʂ vʲɛlkɔˈpɔlskʲi] (German: Kreuz (Ostbahn)) is a town in Poland, with 6,176 inhabitants (2019) in the Czarnków-Trzcianka County, Greater Poland Voivodeship. It is an important railroad junction, with two major lines crossing there - the Berlin-Bydgoszcz and the Poznań-Szczecin connections.

== History ==
As part of historic Greater Poland, i.e. the cradle of the Polish state, the area formed part of Poland since its establishment in the 10th century under the Piast dynasty. Following the fragmentation of Poland into smaller provincial duchies, it formed part of the Duchy of Greater Poland, and later on it was annexed by Prussia.

From 1847 to 1848 the line of the Stargard-Posen Railway Company was built through the area. In 1848, the construction of a train station began at the planned junction of the Küstrin (Kostrzyn nad Odrą)-Posen (Poznań) line, with a reception building built in the classical style. The town owes its existence to the rail, as developed only after 1848, when the Poznań-Szczecin line was opened, crossing the Prussian Eastern Railway. In fact its name (Krzyż and Kreuz in English mean cross) reflects the fact that rail lines cross there.

Although the construction of the Prussian Eastern Railway was only finally approved by the Prussian state parliament at the end of 1849, the railway station Kreuz with the south-west-north-east orientation of its tracks was laid out on a route from Berlin to the lower Vistula and to East Prussia. The construction of the Prussian Eastern Railway began in 1849 from the aforementioned station and was completed in 1851 via Piła to Bydgoszcz. Further sections of the last 740 km route followed until the opening of the last section from the Berlin to Gusow in 1857.

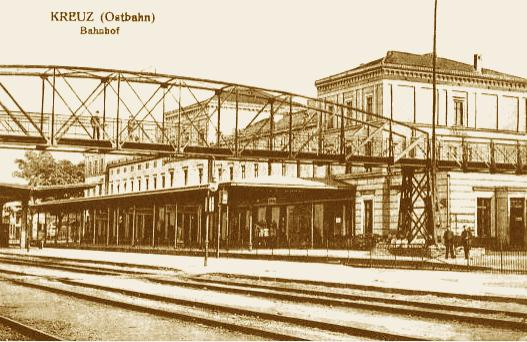
Railway station in Krzyż, 1900

After further railway lines to Wałcz and Rogoźno had been built from this point in the following years, the station had gained such importance that a new settlement developed in its vicinity. In the 1880s, it had a population of 352. A Protestant church was built in 1882 and the market square was completed in 1900. The good rail connections prompted several industrial companies such as a starch factory and wood processing companies to set up in the area. The population had increased from 430 in 1880 to 2,400 in 1910.

Until 1887, Kreuz belonged to the Czarnikau district in the Province of Posen and after its bifurcation, to the Filehne district until 1920. It remained part of Germany in the interwar period, but was located only 2 km from the new border with Poland. Kreuz became part of the newly formed Province of Posen-West Prussia and was located in the Netzekreis district. It was incorporated as a town in 1936. In 1938, with the dissolution of the province of Posen-West Prussia, Kreuz was incorporated into the Province of Pomerania.

Historical population
| Year | Pop. | ±% |
|---|---|---|
| 1939 | 4,956 | — |
| 1950 | 3,404 | −31.3% |
| 1960 | 4,569 | +34.2% |
| 2010 | 6,269 | +37.2% |

During World War II, the Polish resistance was active in the town. Feliks Kasprzak, who founded the local military and civil administration cell of the Home Army, was arrested by the Gestapo in April 1944, however, he escaped during a German-perpetrated death march in 1945. Towards the end of the war, the Red Army occupied the region and 85% of the town was destroyed. After the war, along with northern Greater Poland, it became again part of Poland. The historic Polish name Krzyż was confirmed as official, and later on, the adjective Wielkopolski was added after the region of Greater Poland, within which it is located, to distinguish it from other places of the same name.

== Sports ==
The local football team is Drawa Krzyż Wielkopolski. It competes in the lower divisions.
