= Bukowiec, Czarnków-Trzcianka County =

Bukowiec
- Village
- Location within Poland
- Coordinates: 52°55′15″N 16°28′14″E
- Country: Poland
- Voivodeship: Greater Poland
- County: Czarnków-Trzcianka
- Gmina: Czarnków

Bukowiec [buˈkɔvjɛt͡s] is a village in the administrative district of Gmina Czarnków, within Czarnków-Trzcianka County, Greater Poland Voivodeship, in west-central Poland.
