= Ostrzyce, Lubusz Voivodeship =

Ostrzyce
- Village
- Location within Poland
- Coordinates: 52°03′02″N 15°45′38″E
- Country: Poland
- Voivodeship: Lubusz
- County: Zielona Góra
- Gmina: Trzebiechów

Ostrzyce [ɔsˈtʂɨt͡sɛ] is a village in the administrative district of Gmina Trzebiechów, within Zielona Góra County, Lubusz Voivodeship, in western Poland.
