= Sobolewo, Greater Poland Voivodeship =

Sobolewo
- Village
- Location within Poland
- Coordinates: 52°53′45″N 16°39′12″E
- Country: Poland
- Voivodeship: Greater Poland
- County: Czarnków-Trzcianka
- Gmina: Czarnków
- Population: 80

Sobolewo [sɔbɔˈlɛvɔ] is a village in the administrative district of Gmina Czarnków, within Czarnków-Trzcianka County, Greater Poland Voivodeship, in west-central Poland.
