= Trzebiechów, Zielona Góra County =

Trzebiechów
- Village
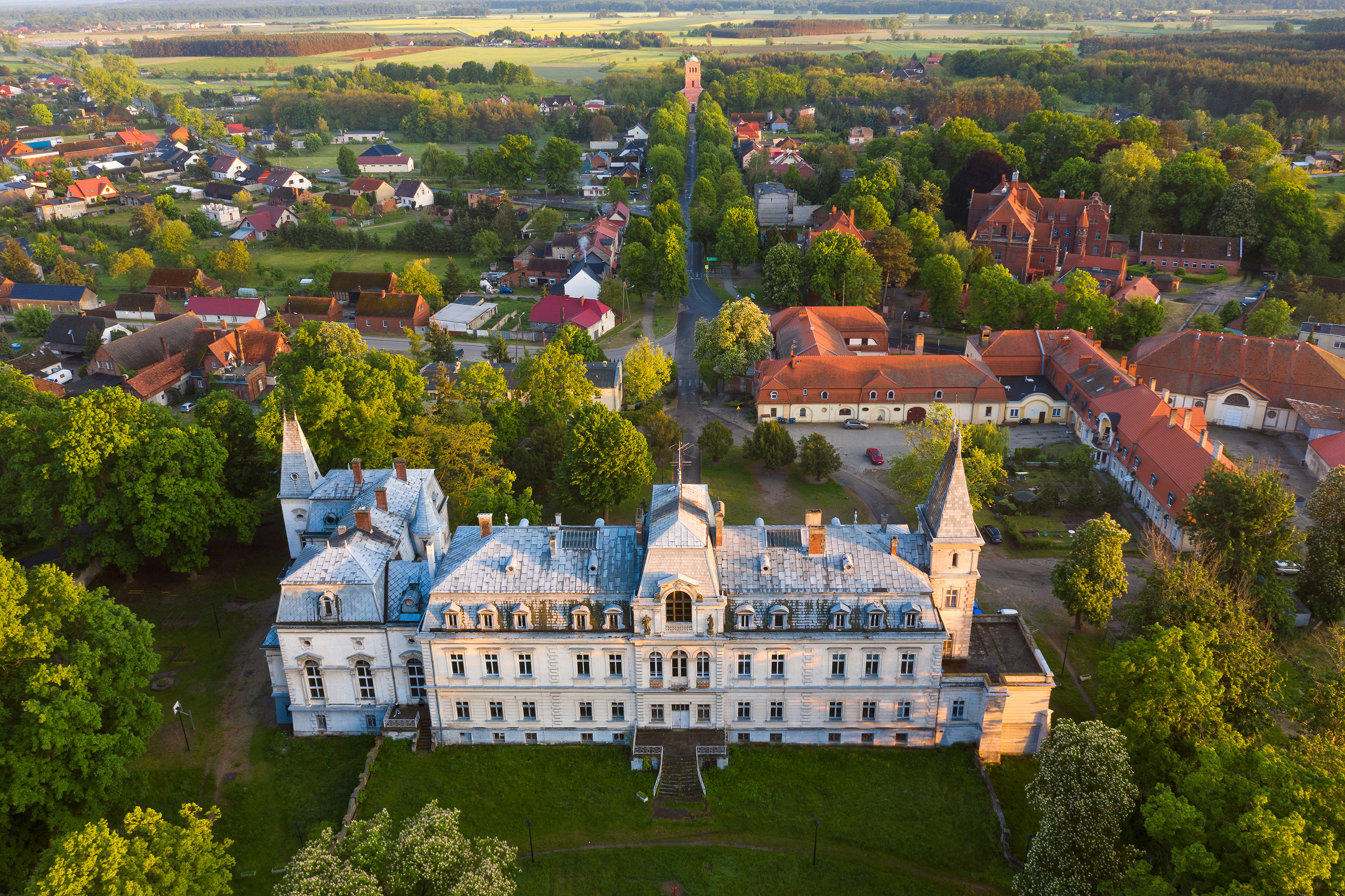
- Aerial view of the palace and village

- Location within Poland
- Coordinates: 52°1′20″N 15°44′10″E
- Country: Poland
- Voivodeship: Lubusz
- County: Zielona Góra
- Gmina: Trzebiechów

Population
  - Total: 920
- Time zone: UTC+1 (CET)
  - Summer (DST): UTC+2 (CEST)
- Vehicle registration: FZI
- Website: http://www.trzebiechow.gminarp.pl/

Trzebiechów ([tʂɛˈbjɛxuf]; German: Trebschen) is a village in Zielona Góra County, Lubusz Voivodeship, in western Poland. It is the seat of the gmina (administrative district) called Gmina Trzebiechów.

The local landmarks are the Trzebiechów Castle and the former sanatorium, the latter listed as a Historic Monument of Poland.

== People ==
- Ulrich Diesing (1911–1945), Luftwaffe general
- Princess Eleonore Reuss of Köstritz (1860-1917), future queen of Bulgaria, was born in the palace of Trebschen
- Heinrich XXIV Reuss of Köstritz (1855–1910), German composer
- Krzysztof Pawlak, Polish football player
