= Sadowo, Lubusz Voivodeship =

Sadowo
- Village
- Location within Poland
- Coordinates: 52°2′1″N 15°40′22″E
- Country: Poland
- Voivodeship: Lubusz
- County: Zielona Góra
- Gmina: Trzebiechów

Sadowo [saˈdɔvɔ] is a village in the administrative district of Gmina Trzebiechów, within Zielona Góra County, Lubusz Voivodeship, in western Poland.
