= Waterway E70 =

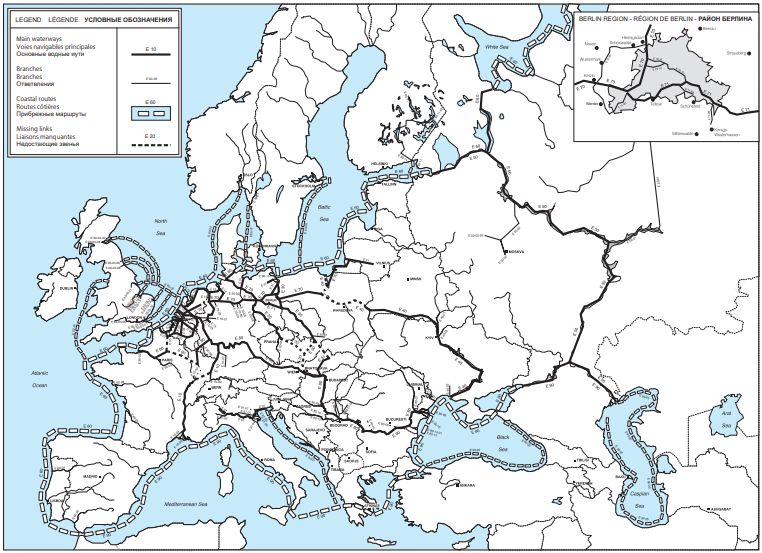
- The project of the scheme of the inland waterways of Europe

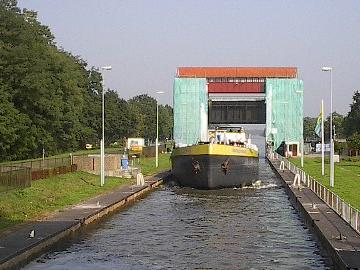
Lock in Eefde

The International Waterway E70 is an international waterway connecting Antwerp (Belgium, Rhine-Meuse Delta coast of the North Sea) via Berlin with Klaipėda (Lithuania, coast of the Baltic Sea), serving as one of the east-west European transport routes. It passes through the Netherlands, Germany, Poland, Russia, and Lithuania.

In Poland, the E70 route runs from the Hohensaaten Ost lock junction of the Odra River with the German Oder-Havel Canal through the Odra River section shared with E30 (Oder Waterway/ Odrzańska Droga Wodna) to Kostrzyn, where it connects with the Odra-Vistula Waterway (Droga wodna Wisła-Odra). The route follows the Warta River, Noteć River, Bydgoszcz Canal, and Brda River until it meets the Vistula River at the Bydgoszcz Water Junction (Bydgoski Węzeł Wodny). From there, the route continues along the Vistula shared with the international Vistula Waterway E40, Nogat River, and Vistula Lagoon to the border with Russia.

== Expansion Plans ==
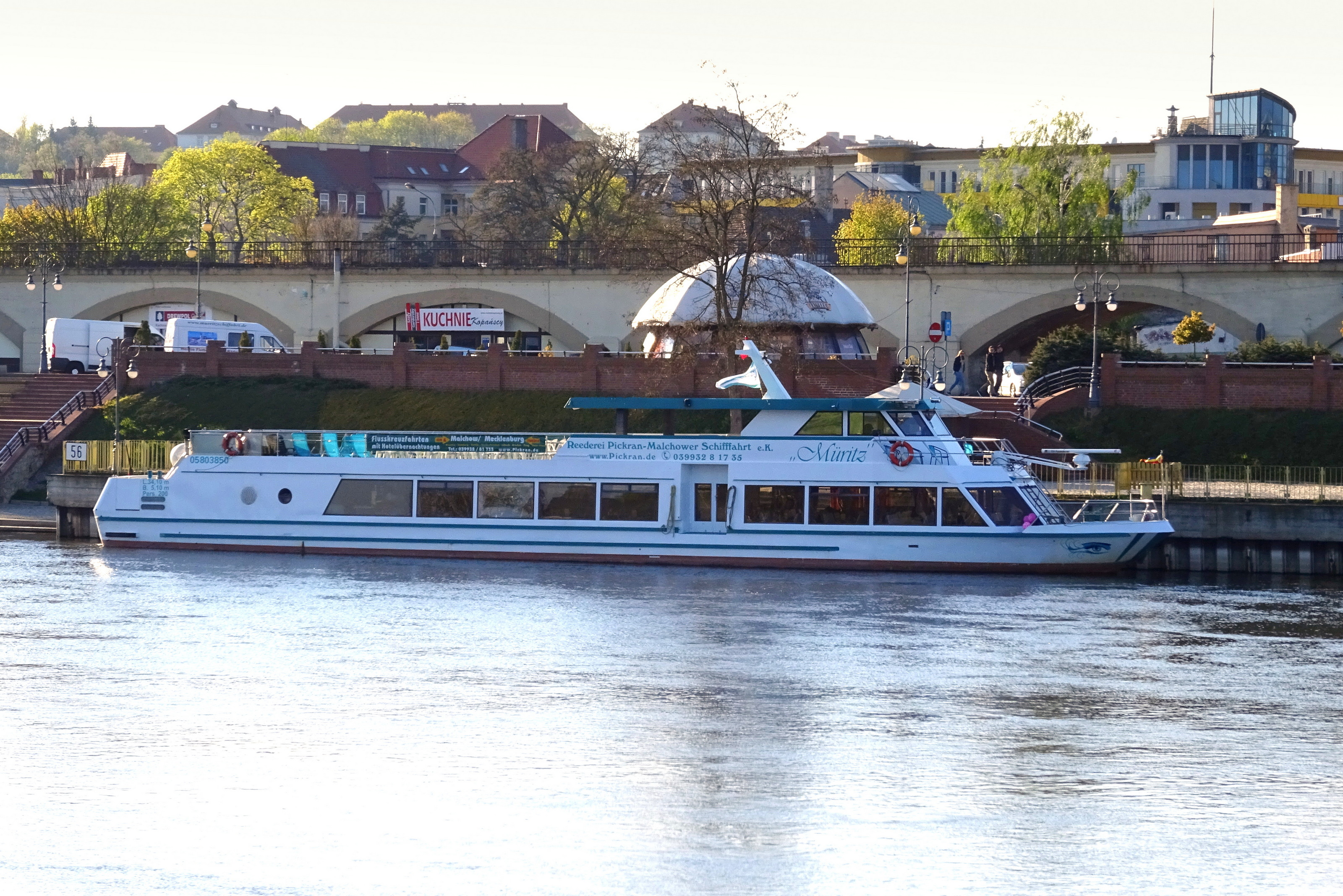
Warta River in Gorzów Wielkopolski. The ship Weiße Flotte MS Müritz from Mecklenburg

The project is an initiative of the participating countries and the European Union. The following sections are planned for expansion:

- Twente Canal (modernization of the Eefde lock)
- Mittelland Canal (upgrade to Class Vb)
- Elbe-Havel Canal and Havel up to the mouth of the Spree River (Class Vb)
- Berlin Waterways (Class IV or higher)
- Oder-Havel Canal (Class Va)

Extensive modernization work is necessary on the Polish section (Warta River, Noteć River, Bydgoszcz Canal, Vistula River). For example, only one of 27 locks is of modern construction.

In its White Paper on inland navigation, the United Nations Economic Commission for Europe (UNECE) points out that the missing connection of the E70 from the Twente Canal to the Mittelland Canal was abandoned after a feasibility study in 2012.
