= Brzeźno, Czarnków-Trzcianka County =

Brzeźno
- Village
- Location within Poland
- Coordinates: 52°54′N 16°37′E
- Country: Poland
- Voivodeship: Greater Poland
- County: Czarnków-Trzcianka
- Gmina: Czarnków
- Population: 810

Brzeźno [ˈbʐɛʑnɔ] is a village in the administrative district of Gmina Czarnków, within Czarnków-Trzcianka County, Greater Poland Voivodeship, in west-central Poland.
