= Borek, Zielona Góra County =

Borek
- Village
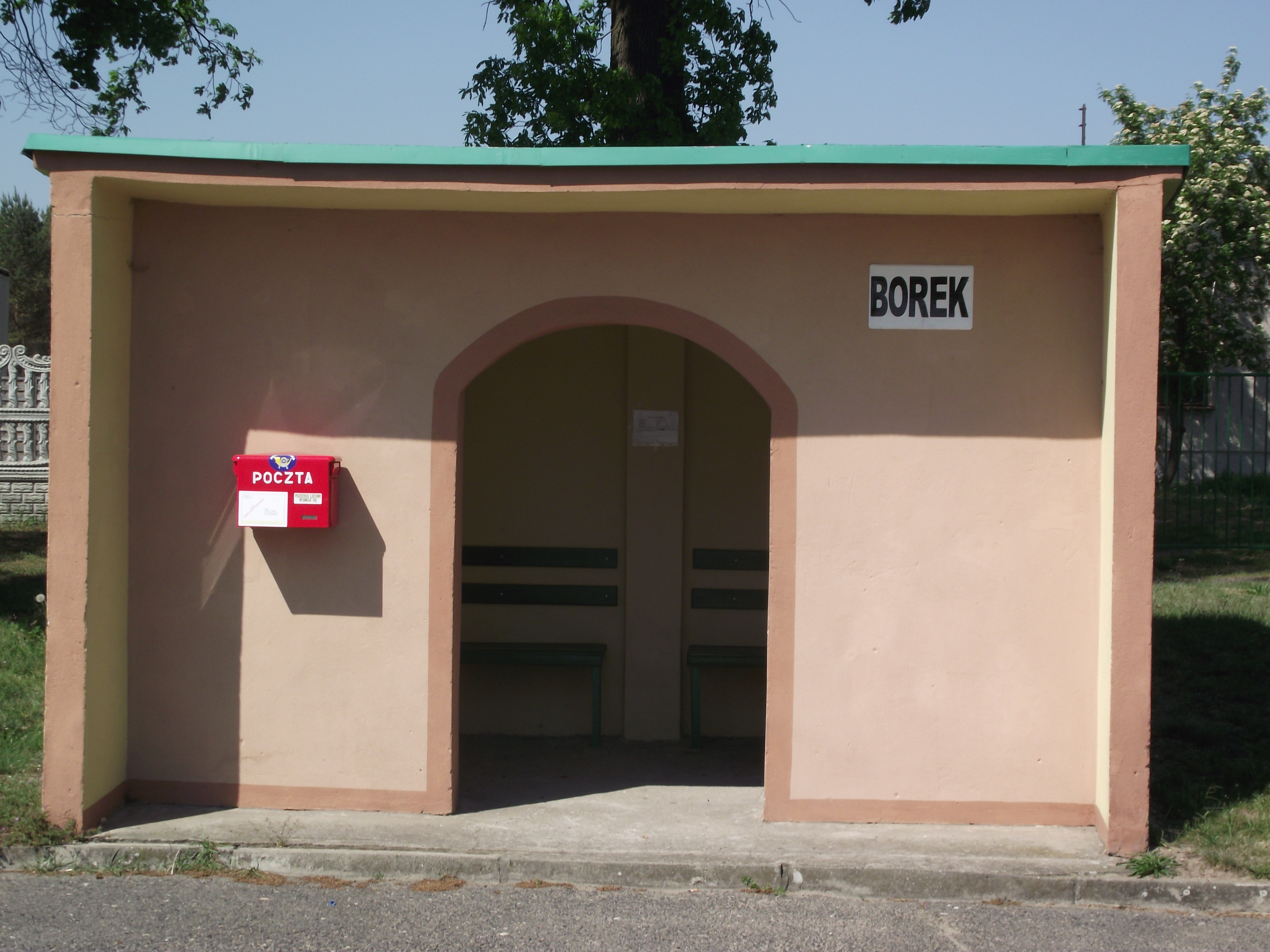
- Bus stop

- Location within Poland
- Coordinates: 52°1′N 15°42′E
- Country: Poland
- Voivodeship: Lubusz
- County: Zielona Góra
- Gmina: Trzebiechów

Borek [ˈbɔrɛk] is a village in the administrative district of Gmina Trzebiechów, within Zielona Góra County, Lubusz Voivodeship, in western Poland.
