= Góra nad Notecią =

- Village
- Location within Poland
- Coordinates: 52°52′53″N 16°29′06″E
- Country: Poland
- Voivodeship: Greater Poland
- County: Czarnków-Trzcianka
- Gmina: Czarnków

Góra nad Notecią [ˈɡura ˌnad nɔˈtɛt͡ɕɔ̃] is a village in the administrative district of Gmina Czarnków, within Czarnków-Trzcianka County, Greater Poland Voivodeship, in west-central Poland.
