= Sarbka, Czarnków-Trzcianka County =

Sarbka
- Village
- Location within Poland
- Coordinates: 52°55′56″N 16°38′54″E
- Country: Poland
- Voivodeship: Greater Poland
- County: Czarnków-Trzcianka
- Gmina: Czarnków

Sarbka [ˈsarpka] is a village in the administrative district of Gmina Czarnków, within Czarnków-Trzcianka County, Greater Poland Voivodeship, in west-central Poland.
