= Głuchów, Zielona Góra County =

Głuchów
- Village
- Location within Poland
- Coordinates: 52°1′23″N 15°39′52″E
- Country: Poland
- Voivodeship: Lubusz
- County: Zielona Góra
- Gmina: Trzebiechów

Głuchów [ˈɡwuxuf] is a village in the administrative district of Gmina Trzebiechów, within Zielona Góra County, Lubusz Voivodeship, in western Poland.
