= Huťka =

Huťka is a Czech surname. In Slovakia the name is Hutka. Notable people with the surname include:

- Jaroslav Hutka (born 1947), Czech musician, composer, songwriter, and activist
- Pavel Huťka (born 1949), Czech tennis player and trainer
