= Kuźnica Czarnkowska =

- Village
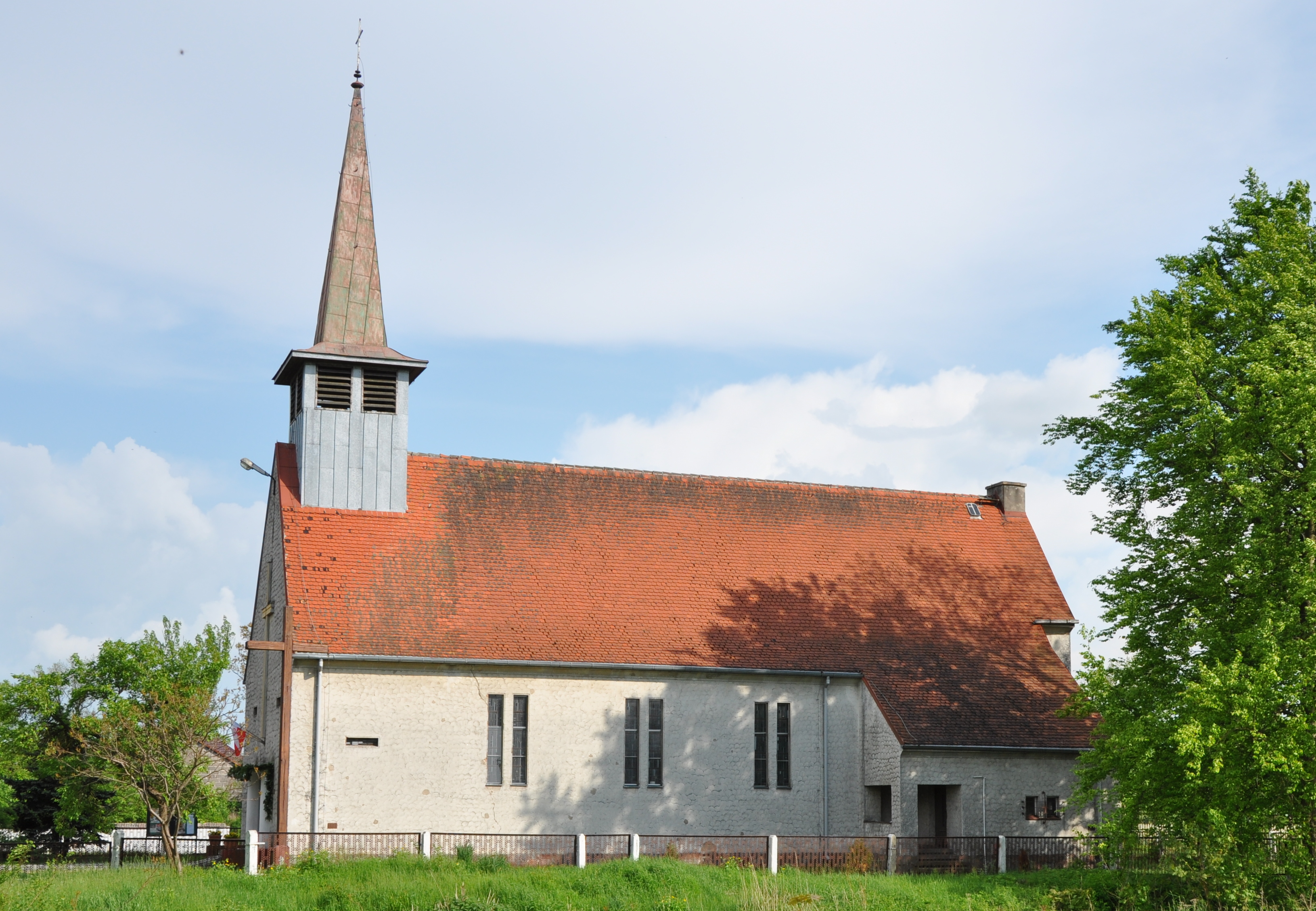

- Location within Poland
- Coordinates: 52°56′N 16°31′E
- Country: Poland
- Voivodeship: Greater Poland
- County: Czarnków-Trzcianka
- Gmina: Czarnków

Kuźnica Czarnkowska (Polish: [kuʑˈɲit͡sa t͡ʂarnˈkɔfska]) is a village in the administrative district of Gmina Czarnków, within Czarnków-Trzcianka County, Greater Poland Voivodeship, in west-central Poland.
