= Sarbia, Czarnków-Trzcianka County =

Sarbia
- Village
- Location within Poland
- Coordinates: 52°56′27″N 16°39′46″E
- Country: Poland
- Voivodeship: Greater Poland
- County: Czarnków-Trzcianka
- Gmina: Czarnków

Sarbia [ˈsarbja] is a village in the administrative district of Gmina Czarnków, within Czarnków-Trzcianka County, Greater Poland Voivodeship, in west-central Poland.
