= Nowe Dwory, Greater Poland Voivodeship =

Nowe Dwory
- Village
- Location within Poland
- Coordinates: 52°53′59″N 16°19′10″E
- Country: Poland
- Voivodeship: Greater Poland
- County: Czarnków-Trzcianka
- Gmina: Wieleń
- Population: 380

Nowe Dwory [ˈnɔvɛ ˈdvɔrɨ] is a village in the administrative district of Gmina Wieleń, within Czarnków-Trzcianka County, Greater Poland Voivodeship, in west-central Poland.
