= Podlegórz =

- Village
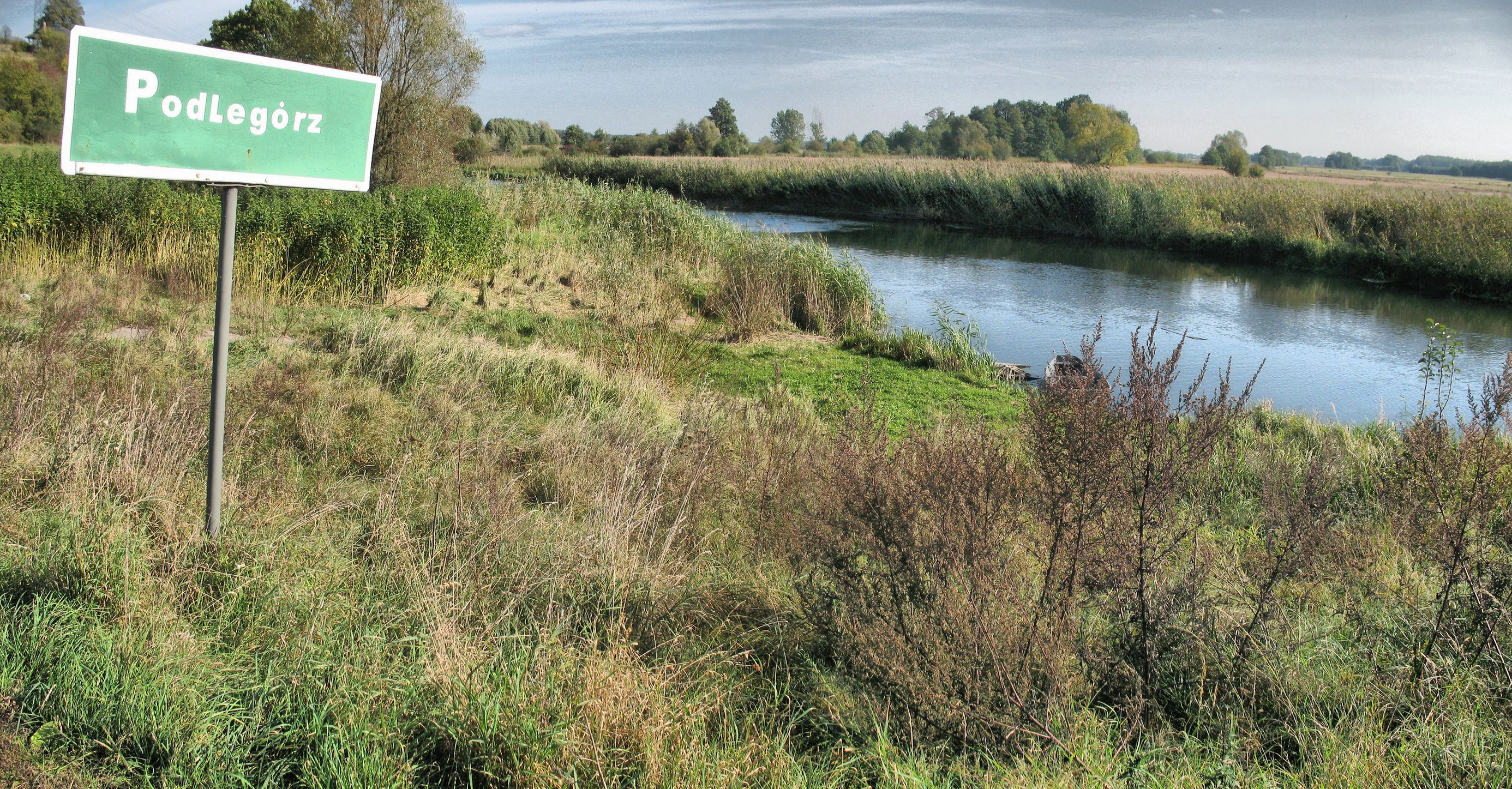

- Location within Poland
- Coordinates: 52°3′N 15°42′E
- Country: Poland
- Voivodeship: (Lubusz Voivodeship) Lubusz
- County: Zielona Góra
- Gmina: Trzebiechów
- Website: http://www.podlegorz.republika.pl/

Podlegórz [pɔdˈlɛɡuʂ] is a village in the administrative district of Gmina Trzebiechów, within Zielona Góra County, Lubusz Voivodeship, in western Poland.
