= Gębice, Zielona Góra County =

Village in Gmina Trzebiechów, Poland

Gębice
- Village
- Location within Poland
- Coordinates: 52°00′25″N 15°43′01″E
- Country: Poland
- Voivodeship: Lubusz
- County: Zielona Góra
- Gmina: Trzebiechów

Gębice [ɡɛmˈbit͡sɛ] is a village in the administrative district of Gmina Trzebiechów, within Zielona Góra County, Lubusz Voivodeship, in western Poland.
