= Hutka, Greater Poland Voivodeship =

Hutka
- Village
- Location within Poland
- Coordinates: 52°53′12″N 16°41′28″E
- Country: Poland
- Voivodeship: Greater Poland
- County: Czarnków-Trzcianka
- Gmina: Czarnków
- Population: 40

Hutka [ˈxutka] is a village in the administrative district of Gmina Czarnków, within Czarnków-Trzcianka County, Greater Poland Voivodeship, in west-central Poland.
