= Mieszkowo, Lubusz Voivodeship =

Mieszkowo
- Village
- Location within Poland
- Coordinates: 52°00′39″N 15°44′04″E
- Country: Poland
- Voivodeship: Lubusz
- County: Zielona Góra
- Gmina: Trzebiechów

Mieszkowo [mjɛʂˈkɔvɔ] is a village in the administrative district of Gmina Trzebiechów, within Zielona Góra County, Lubusz Voivodeship, in western Poland.
