= Radowice, Lubusz Voivodeship =

Radowice
- Village
- Location within Poland
- Coordinates: 52°3′N 15°41′E
- Country: Poland
- Voivodeship: Lubusz
- County: Zielona Góra
- Gmina: Trzebiechów

Radowice [radɔˈvit͡sɛ] is a village in the administrative district of Gmina Trzebiechów, within Zielona Góra County, Lubusz Voivodeship, in western Poland.
