= Mikołajewo, Czarnków-Trzcianka County =

Mikołajewo
- Village
- Location within Poland
- Coordinates: 52°53′N 16°25′E
- Country: Poland
- Voivodeship: Greater Poland
- County: Czarnków-Trzcianka
- Gmina: Czarnków

Mikołajewo [mikɔwaˈjɛvɔ]) is a village in the administrative district of Gmina Czarnków, within Czarnków-Trzcianka County, Greater Poland Voivodeship, in west-central Poland.
