= Hutka =

- Municipality
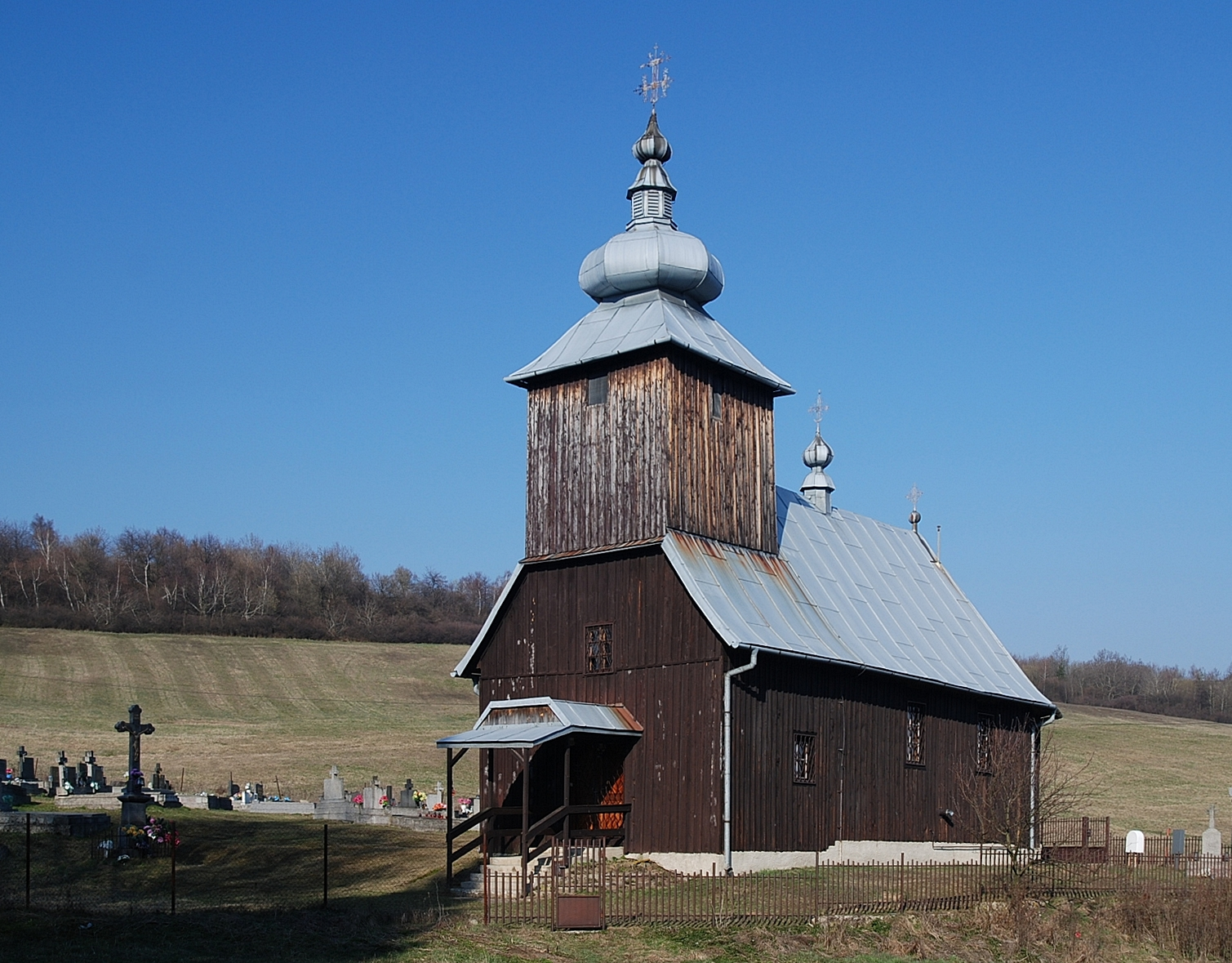
- Wooden church in village

- Flag

- Location of Hutka in the Prešov Region Location of Hutka in Slovakia
- Coordinates: 49.40°N 21.43°E
- Country: Slovakia
- Region: Prešov Region
- District: Bardejov District
- First mentioned: 1618

Area
  - Total: 3.69 km^{2} (1.42 sq mi)
- Elevation: 372 m (1,220 ft)

Population (2025)
  - Total: 101
- Time zone: UTC+1 (CET)
  - Summer (DST): UTC+2 (CEST)
- Postal code: 863 6
- Area code: +421 54
- Vehicle registration plate (until 2022): BJ
- Website: obechutka.sk

Hutka (Rusyn: Гутка) is a village and small municipality in Bardejov District in the Prešov Region of north-east Slovakia.

== History ==
In historical records the village was first mentioned in 1618.

== Geography ==
The municipality lies at an altitude of 372 metres (1,220 ft) and covers an area of 3.69 km^{2} (1.42 sq mi) (2025).

== Population ==
Population statistic (10 years)
Year	1995	2005	2015	2025
Count	97	86	87	101
Difference		−11.34%	+1.16%	+16.09%

Population statistic
Year	2024	2025
Count	97	101
Difference		+4.12%

It has a population of 101 people (31 December 2025).

=== Ethnicity ===
Census 2021 (1+ %)
Ethnicity	Number	Fraction
Slovak	80	83.33%
Rusyn	44	45.83%
Romani	11	11.45%
Polish	2	2.08%
Not found out	2	2.08%
Ukrainian	1	1.04%
Italian	1	1.04%
Total	96	

In year 2021 was 96 people by ethnicity 80 as Slovak, 44 as Rusyn, 11 as Romani, 2 as Polish, 2 as Not found out, 1 as Ukrainian and 1 as Italian.

Note on population: The difference values of population numbers in the table "Population statistic" and in the sections "Ethnicity" & "Religion" is caused by the use of various statistical methods.

=== Religion ===
Census 2021 (1+ %)
Religion	Number	Fraction
Eastern Orthodox Church	62	64.58%
Roman Catholic Church	16	16.67%
Greek Catholic Church	10	10.42%
None	6	6.25%
Paganism and natural spirituality	1	1.04%
Not found out	1	1.04%
Total	96	

In year 2021 was 96 people by religion 62 from Eastern Orthodox Church, 16 from Roman Catholic Church, 10 from Greek Catholic Church, 6 from None, 1 from Paganism and natural spirituality and 1 from Not found out.

== Genealogical resources ==
The records for genealogical research are available at the state archive "Statny Archiv in Presov, Slovakia"

- Roman Catholic church records (births/marriages/deaths): 1695-1901 (parish B)
- Greek Catholic church records (births/marriages/deaths): 1805-1901 (parish B)

== See also ==
- List of municipalities and towns in Slovakia
