= Romanowo Dolne =

- Village
- Location within Poland
- Coordinates: 52°57′N 16°35′E
- Country: Poland
- Voivodeship: Greater Poland
- County: Czarnków-Trzcianka
- Gmina: Czarnków

Romanowo Dolne [rɔmaˈnɔvɔ ˈdɔlnɛ] is a village in the administrative district of Gmina Czarnków, within Czarnków-Trzcianka County, Greater Poland Voivodeship, in west-central Poland.
