= Białężyn, Czarnków-Trzcianka County =

Białężyn
- Village
- Location within Poland
- Coordinates: 52°53′08″N 16°37′46″E
- Country: Poland
- Voivodeship: Greater Poland
- County: Czarnków-Trzcianka
- Gmina: Czarnków

Białężyn [bjaˈwɛ̃ʐɨn] is a village in the administrative district of Gmina Czarnków, within Czarnków-Trzcianka County, Greater Poland Voivodeship, in west-central Poland.

== Name ==
The village has medieval origins. Its earliest recorded name appears in a Latin document from 1432 as "Byalanschino". Later records include the spellings "Byelaszyno" (1486), "Bialazyno" (1506), and "Byalęzhyno" (1553).

== Bibliography ==
- Gąsiorowski, Antoni (2003). Słownik historyczno-geograficzny województwa poznańskiego w średniowieczu, cz. IV (R–S), hasło „Białężyn” (in Polish). Poznań: Wydawnictwo PTPN. p. 38.
