= Pianówka =

- Village
- Location within Poland
- Coordinates: 52°53′5″N 16°30′10″E
- Country: Poland
- Voivodeship: Greater Poland
- County: Czarnków-Trzcianka
- Gmina: Czarnków
- Population: 140

Pianówka [pjaˈnufka] is a village in the administrative district of Gmina Czarnków, within Czarnków-Trzcianka County, Greater Poland Voivodeship, in west-central Poland.
