= Gawin =

Gawin may refer to:

- Gawin (surname)
- Gawin, Kuyavian-Pomeranian Voivodeship
