= Popielewskie Lake =

Lake

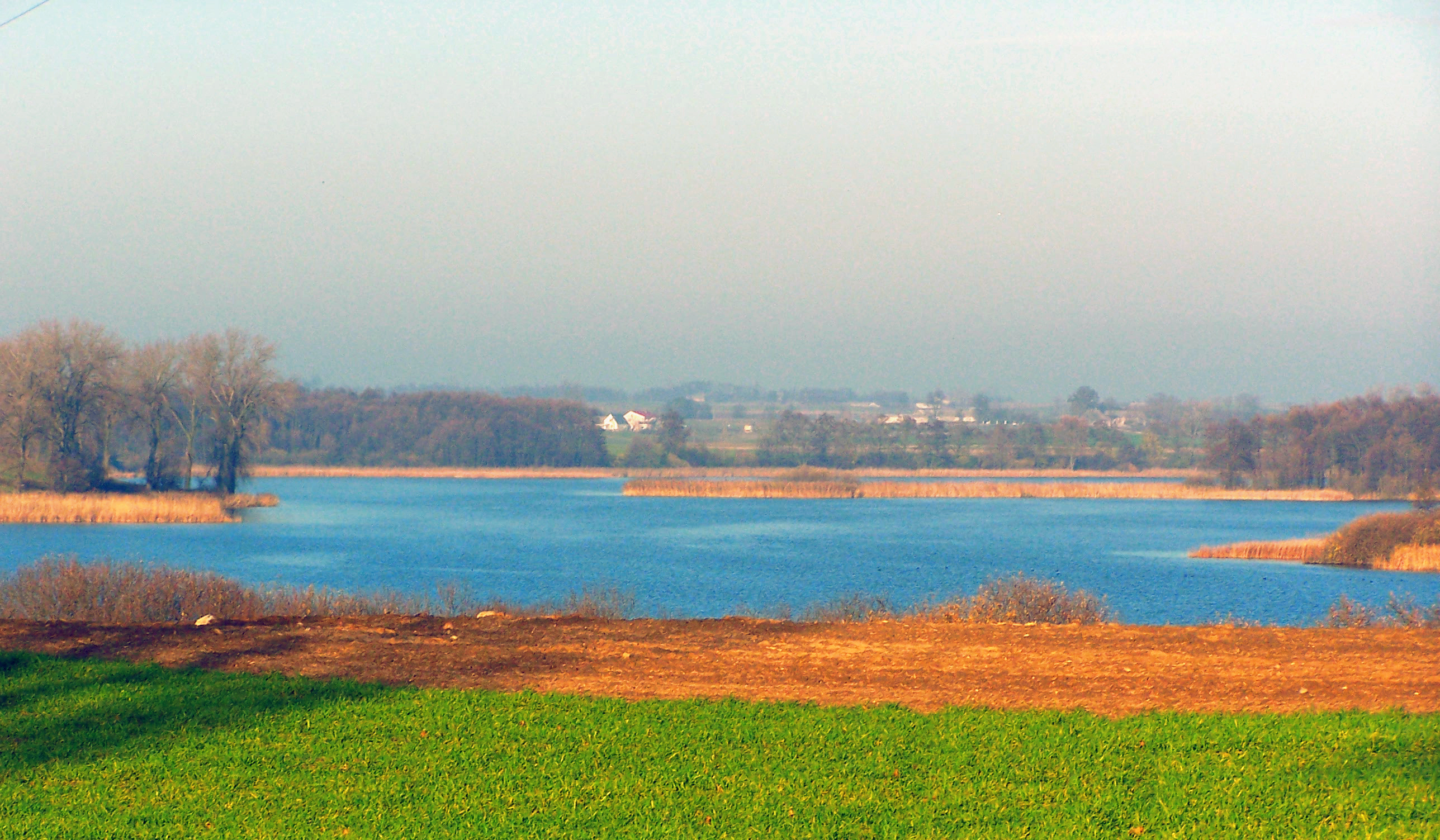

- Location within Greater Poland Voivodeship
- Location: Gmina Trzemeszno, Greater Poland Voivodeship
- Coordinates: 52°34′03″N 17°51′47″E
- Primary outflows: Panna
- Basin countries: Poland
- Max. length: 10 km (6.2 mi)
- Max. width: 0.6 km (0.37 mi)
- Surface area: 3.085 km^{2} (1.191 sq mi)
- Average depth: 12.4 m (41 ft)
- Max. depth: 45.8 m (150 ft)
- Settlements: Trzemeszno, Popielewo

Popielewskie Lake is a lake in Gmina Trzemeszno, Gniezno County, Greater Poland Voivodeship, north-central Poland, near the city of Gniezno. It is a ribbon lake in the Noteć river basin.
