= Prosno =

Prosno may refer to the following places in Poland:

- Prosno, Kuyavian-Pomeranian Voivodeship (north-central Poland)
- Prosno, West Pomeranian Voivodeship (north-west Poland)
- Prośno, Warmian-Masurian Voivodeship (north Poland)
