= Gulczanka =

Location
- Country: Poland
- Voivodeship: Greater Poland
- County (Powiat): Czarnków–Trzcianka

Physical characteristics
- Source
  - location: near Śmieszkowo, Gmina Czarnków
  - elevation: 125 m (410 ft)
- Mouth: Noteć
  - location: northwest of Gulcz, Gmina Wieleń
  - coordinates: 52°53′20″N 16°20′42″E
  - elevation: 35.3 m (116 ft)
- Length: 32.53 km (20.21 mi)
- Basin size: 98.077 km^{2} (37.868 mi^{2})

Basin features
- Progression: Noteć→ Warta→ Oder→ Baltic Sea

Gulczanka is a river of Poland, a tributary of the Noteć which it meets in the village of Gulcz.
