= Szczecin (disambiguation) =

Szczecin is the capital of West Pomeranian Voivodeship (north-west Poland).

Szczecin may also refer to:

- Szczecin, Kuyavian-Pomeranian Voivodeship (north-central Poland)
- Szczecin, Łódź Voivodeship (central Poland)

== See also ==
- Stettin (disambiguation)
