= Łanięta =

Łanięta may refer to the following places:

- Łanięta, Kuyavian-Pomeranian Voivodeship (north-central Poland)
- Łanięta, Łódź Voivodeship (central Poland)
- Łanięta, Masovian Voivodeship (east-central Poland)
