= Sadok =

Sadok may refer to:

== Given name ==
- Sadok Barącz (1814–1892), Galician religious leader, historian, folklorist, archivist, of Armenian descent
- Sadok Belaïd (1939–2026), Tunisian jurist and academic
- Sadok Chaabane (born 1950), Tunisian professor
- Sadok Ghileb (1840–1912), Tunisian politician
- Sadok Khalgui (born 1978), Tunisian judoka
- Sadok Sassi (born 1945), Tunisian footballer
- Hadj Sadok Bouziane (born 1987), Algerian football player
- Sadok, spelling variant of Zadoc (given name)

== Surname ==
- Omrane Sadok (1937–2021), Tunisian boxer

== Other ==
- Sadok, Kuyavian-Pomeranian Voivodeship, a village in the administrative district of Gmina Chodecz, within Włocławek County, Kuyavian-Pomeranian Voivodeship, in north-central Poland.
- Sadok, another name for the Salakot, a Filipino traditional headgear
