= Bolemka =

Location
- Country: Poland

Physical characteristics
- Mouth
  - location: Noteć
  - coordinates: 52°59′43″N 16°55′39″E

Basin features
- Progression: Noteć→ Warta→ Oder→ Baltic Sea

Bolemka is a 7 km-long river in the Wielkopolska region of Poland, and a tributary of the Noteć near Chodzież. The Bolemka flows into Lake Jezioro Chodzieskie, also known as City Lake.
