= Lania =

Lania may refer to:

- Łania, Kuyavian-Pomeranian Voivodeship, Poland
- Laneia, a village in Cyprus
- "-lania", a suffix used in taxonomy.
