= Tremessen =

Tremessen is an old name for

- Tlemcen, city in Algeria
- Trzemeszno, town in Poland
