= Cetty =

- Village
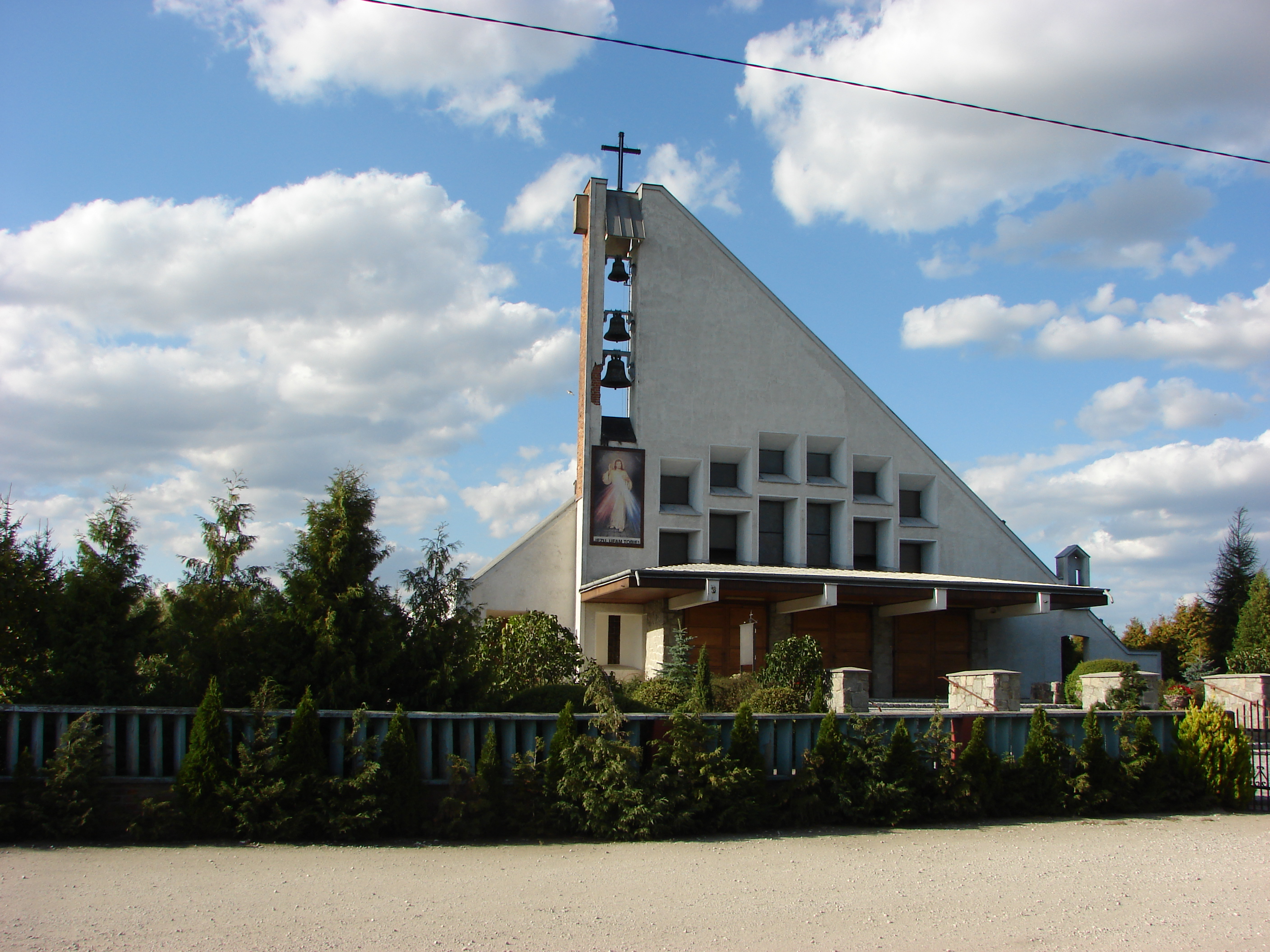
- Church of St. Mary of Częstochowa

- Flag

- Location within Poland
- Coordinates: 52°23′N 18°58′E
- Country: Poland
- Voivodeship: Kuyavian-Pomeranian
- County: Włocławek
- Gmina: Chodecz

Cetty (Polish pronunciation [ˈt͡sɛttɨ]) is a village in the administrative district of Gmina Chodecz, within Włocławek County, Kuyavian-Pomeranian Voivodeship, in north-central Poland.
