= Mielinek =

- Village
- Location within Poland
- Coordinates: 52°25′N 18°59′E
- Country: Poland
- Voivodeship: Kuyavian-Pomeranian
- County: Włocławek
- Gmina: Chodecz

Mielinek [mjɛˈlinɛk] is a village in the administrative district of Gmina Chodecz, within Włocławek County, Kuyavian-Pomeranian Voivodeship, in north-central Poland.
