= Panna (river) =

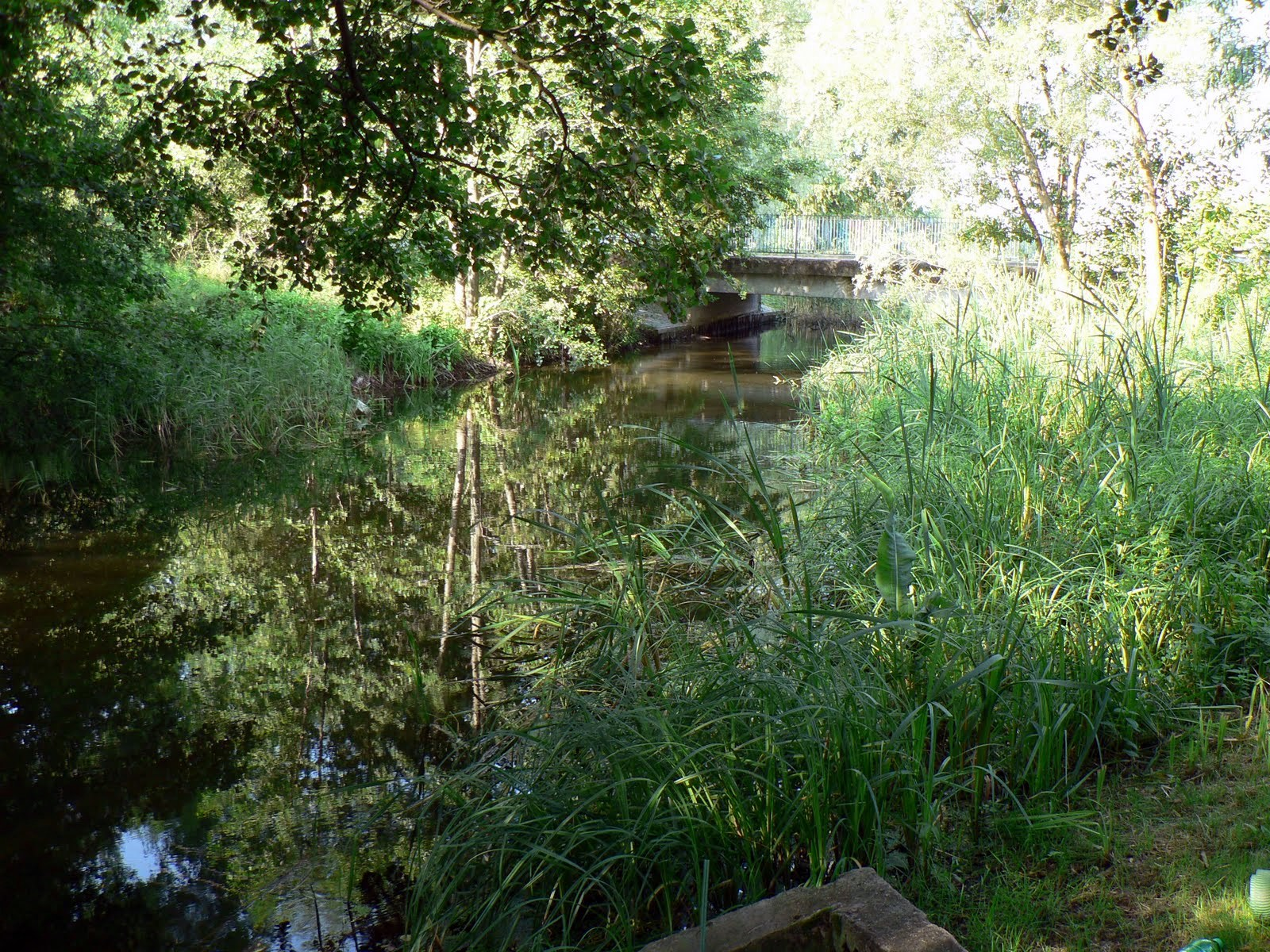

Location
- Country: Poland

Physical characteristics
- Mouth
  - location: Mała Noteć
  - coordinates: 52°37′25″N 18°02′50″E

Basin features
- Progression: Mała Noteć→ Noteć→ Warta→ Oder→ Baltic Sea

Panna is a river of Poland, a left tributary of the Mała Noteć in Kwieciszewo.
