= Podgórze, Kuyavian-Pomeranian Voivodeship =

Podgórze
- Village
- Location within Poland
- Coordinates: 52°24′37″N 19°00′25″E
- Country: Poland
- Voivodeship: Kuyavian-Pomeranian
- County: Włocławek
- Gmina: Chodecz

Population
  - Total: 6
- Time zone: UTC+1 (CET)
  - Summer (DST): UTC+2 (CEST)

Podgórze [pɔdˈɡuʐɛ] is a village in the administrative district of Gmina Chodecz, within Włocławek County, Kuyavian-Pomeranian Voivodeship, in central Poland.
