= Lubieniec, Kuyavian-Pomeranian Voivodeship =

Lubieniec
- Village
- Location within Poland
- Coordinates: 52°26′00″N 19°00′21″E
- Country: Poland
- Voivodeship: Kuyavian-Pomeranian
- County: Włocławek
- Gmina: Chodecz

Lubieniec [luˈbjɛɲɛt͡s] is a village in the administrative district of Gmina Chodecz, within Włocławek County, Kuyavian-Pomeranian Voivodeship, in north-central Poland.
