= Zbijewo =

- Village
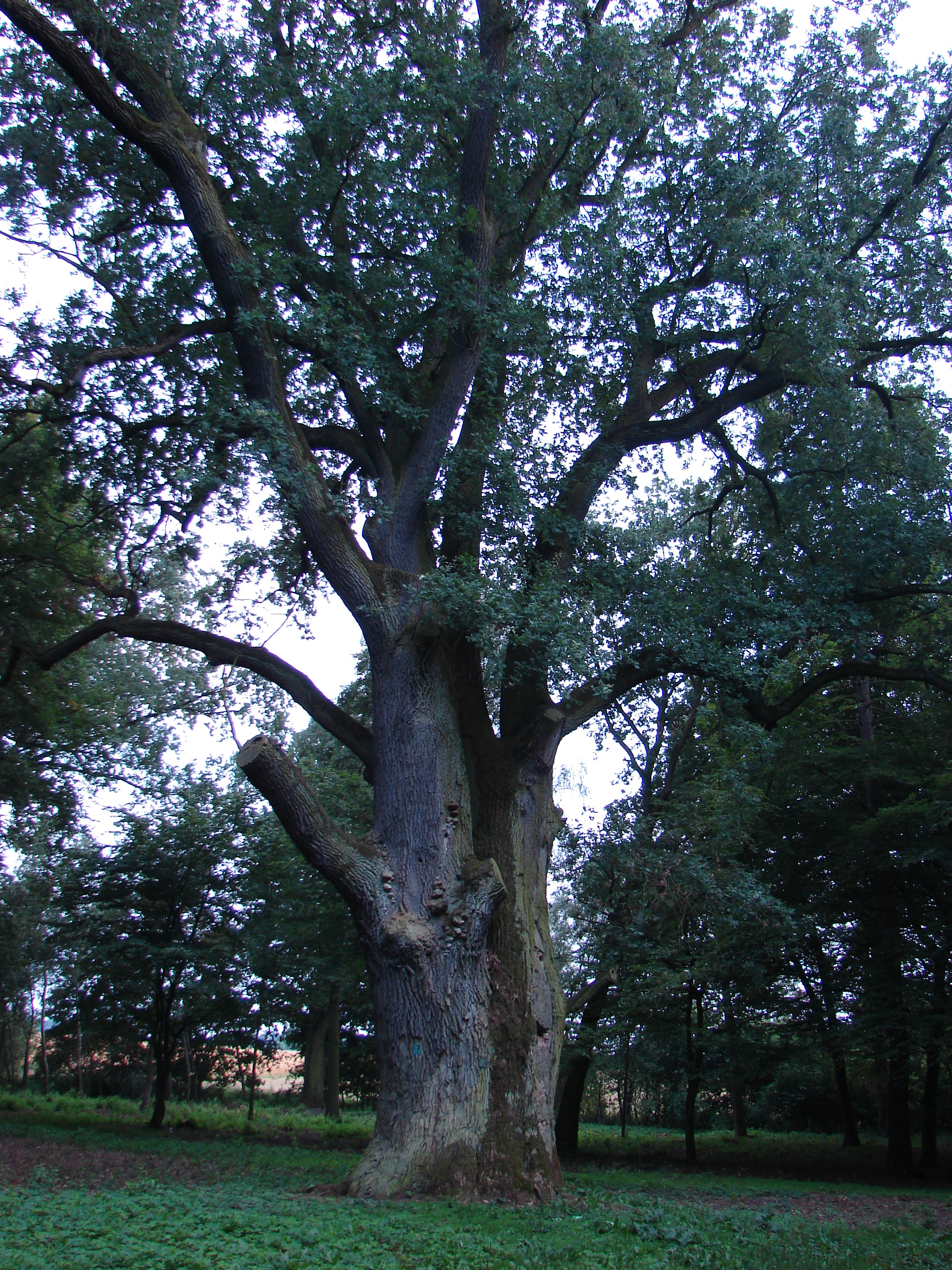
- Kiejstut, the pedunculate oak (Quercus robur). About 700 years old and 758 cm circuit.

- Location within Poland
- Coordinates: 52°22′N 18°58′E
- Country: Poland
- Voivodeship: Kuyavian-Pomeranian
- County: Włocławek
- Gmina: Chodecz

Zbijewo [zbiˈjɛvɔ] is a village in the administrative district of Gmina Chodecz, within Włocławek County, Kuyavian-Pomeranian Voivodeship, in north-central Poland.
