= Nowiny, Włocławek County =

Nowiny
- Village
- Location within Poland
- Coordinates: 52°27′N 19°1′E
- Country: Poland
- Voivodeship: Kuyavian-Pomeranian
- County: Włocławek
- Gmina: Chodecz

Nowiny [nɔˈvinɨ] is a village in the administrative district of Gmina Chodecz, within Włocławek County, Kuyavian-Pomeranian Voivodeship, in north-central Poland.
