= Zieleniewo, Kuyavian-Pomeranian Voivodeship =

Zieleniewo
- Village
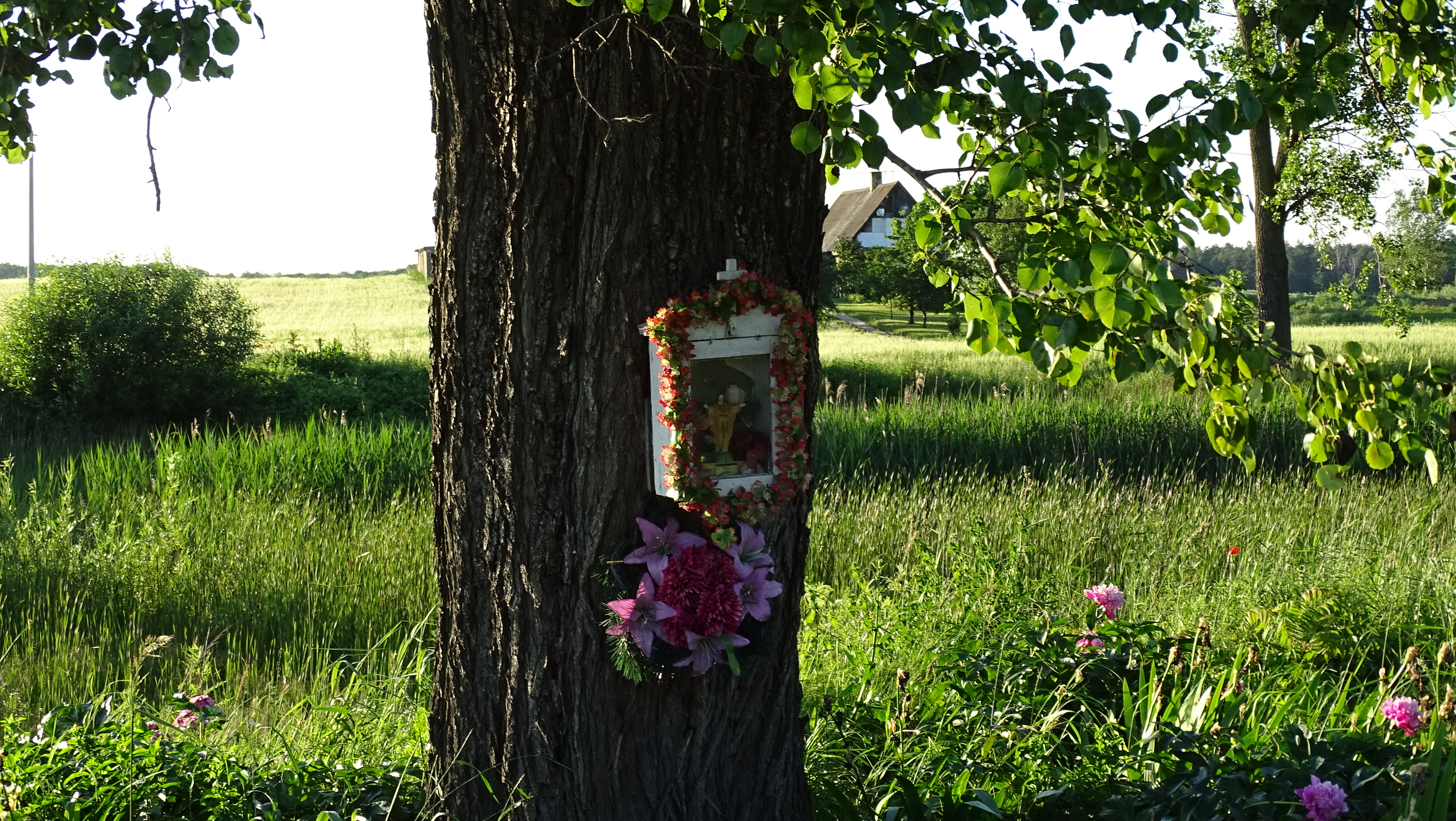
- The wayside shrine

- Location within Poland
- Coordinates: 52°24′26″N 18°59′11″E
- Country: Poland
- Voivodeship: Kuyavian-Pomeranian
- County: Włocławek
- Gmina: Chodecz

Zieleniewo [ʑɛlɛˈɲɛvɔ] is a village in the administrative district of Gmina Chodecz, within Włocławek County, Kuyavian-Pomeranian Voivodeship, in north-central Poland.
