= Wola Adamowa =

- Village
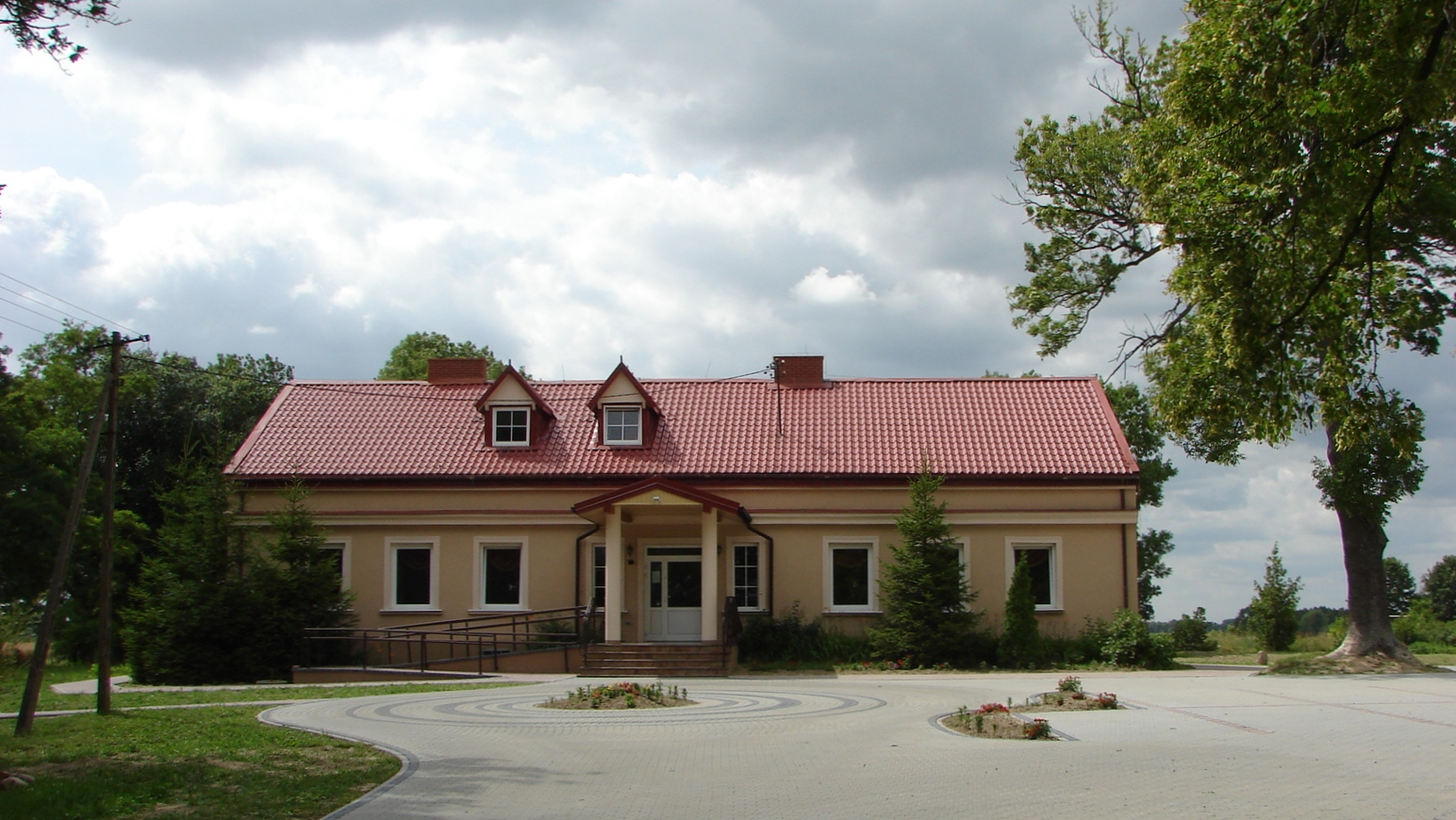
- The manor house, late 19th century

- Location within Poland
- Coordinates: 52°26′31″N 19°00′54″E
- Country: Poland
- Voivodeship: Kuyavian-Pomeranian
- County: Włocławek
- Gmina: Chodecz

Wola Adamowa [ˈvɔla adaˈmɔva] is a village in the administrative district of Gmina Chodecz, within Włocławek County, Kuyavian-Pomeranian Voivodeship, in north-central Poland.
