= Chodeczek =

- Village
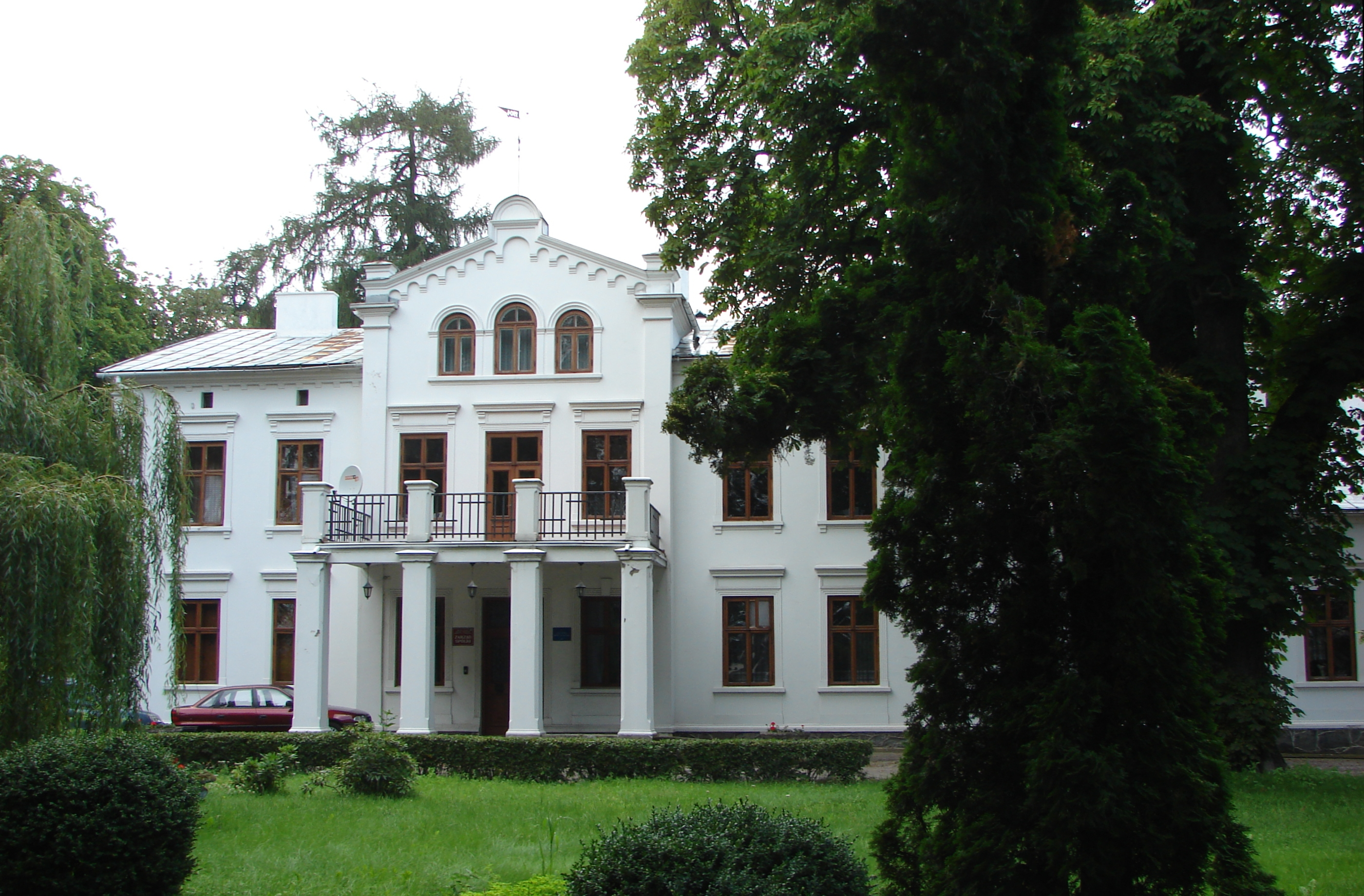
- Manor house, built 1904–1906

- Location within Poland
- Coordinates: 52°24′00″N 19°02′00″E
- Country: Poland
- Voivodeship: Kuyavian-Pomeranian
- County: Włocławek
- Gmina: Chodecz

Chodeczek [xɔˈdɛt͡ʂɛk] is a village in the administrative district of Gmina Chodecz, within Włocławek County, Kuyavian-Pomeranian Voivodeship, in north-central Poland.
