= Noteć =

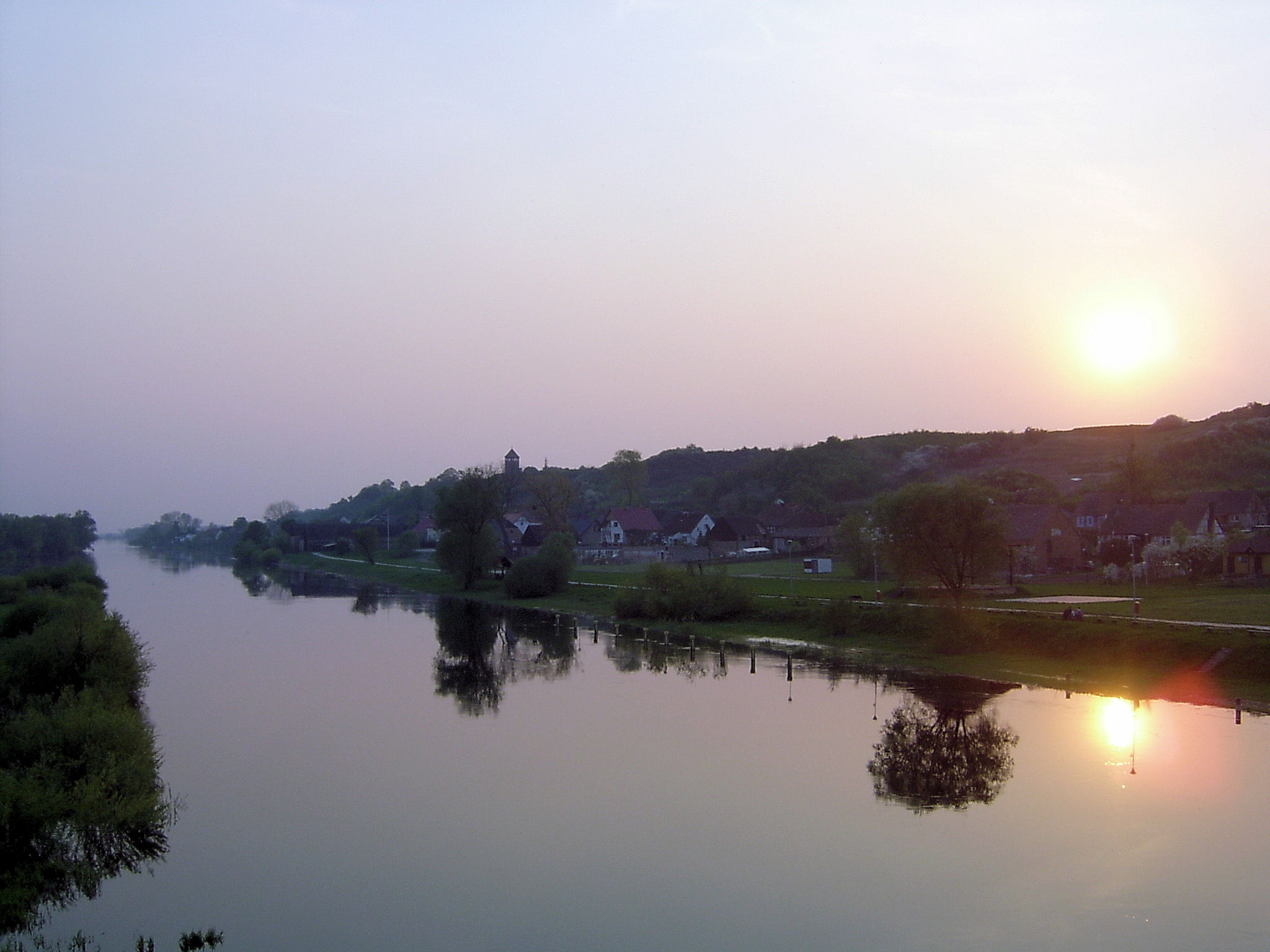
- Noteć near Santok

Location
- Country: Poland
- Voivodeships: Kuyavian-Pomeranian, Greater Poland, Lubusz
- Towns/Cities: Inowrocław, Kruszwica, Pakość, Barcin, Łabiszyn, Nakło nad Notecią, Ujście, Czarnków, Wieleń, Drezdenko

Physical characteristics
- Source: Between Szczecin and Bogołomia (Gmina Chodecz); 52°22′29″N 19°00′25″E
- Mouth: Warta at Santok; 52°44′09″N 15°24′20″E
- Length: 391 km (243 mi)
- Basin size: 17,302 km^{2} (6,680 sq mi)
- Discharge
  - average: 76.6 m^{3}/s (2,710 cu ft/s)

Basin features
- Progression: Warta→ Oder→ Baltic Sea
- Tributaries
  - left: Mała Noteć, Gąsawka, Kcyninka, Gulczanka
  - right: Gwda, Drawa

The Noteć (Polish pronunciation: [ˈnɔtɛtɕ]; German: Netze, Latin: Natissis) is a river in central Poland with a length of 391 km (243 mi) (7th longest) and a basin area of 17,302 km^{2} (6,680 mi^{2}). It is the largest tributary of the Warta river and lies completely within Poland.

== Course ==
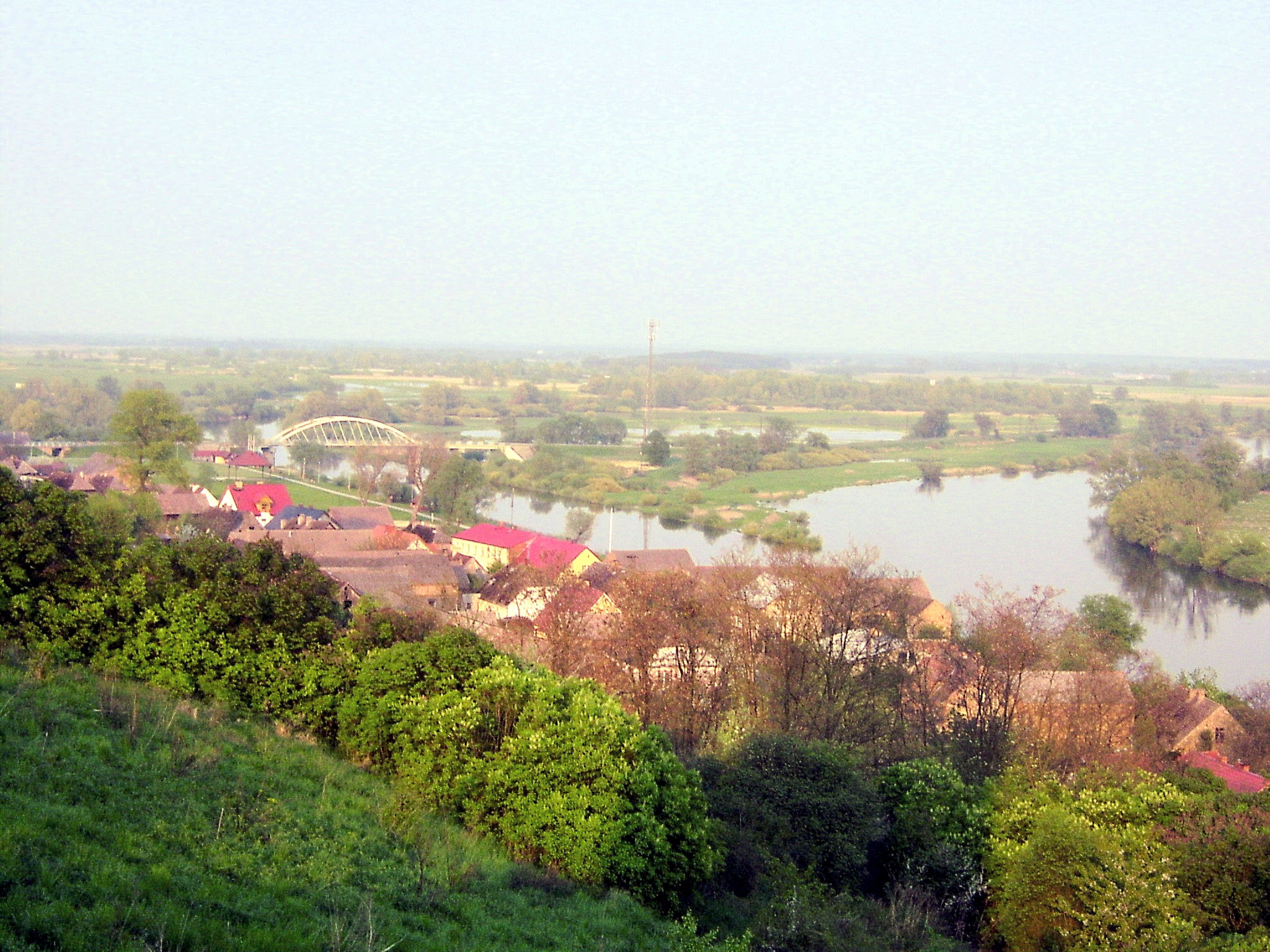
River mouth at Santok

It rises in the Kuyavian-Pomeranian Voivodeship and flows through Lake Gopło and the town of Inowrocław. It reaches the voivodeship of Greater Poland in the historic Pałuki region south of Piła. Further down in Lubusz Voivodeship, it empties into the Warta at Santok near Gorzów Wielkopolski. The river is usually subdivided into an upper part (Noteć Górna), running from its source to Nakło, and a lower part (Noteć Dolna) from Nakło to its mouth into the Warta River. At Nakło, the Bydgoszcz Canal, built in 1773/74, connects the Noteć River with the Brda river, a tributary of the Vistula, at Bydgoszcz.

The lower sections down from the mouth of the Drawa (near Krzyż Wielkopolski) are located within the broad Toruń-Eberswalde Urstromtal. These large wetlands, with only two historic river crossings at Santok and Drezdenko, are sparsely populated.

Most portions of the Noteć are navigable. Several locks and dams connect the Vistula and the Warta/Oder waterways.

== History ==
In medieval times, the impenetrable marshes of the lower Noteć River formed the border between the Kingdom of Poland and the lands of the Pomeranian tribes on the Baltic coast. Disputed for centuries, the fortresses of Santok and Drezdenko finally were acquired by Margrave Conrad of Brandenburg on the occasion of his wedding with Constance of Poznań, daughter of the Piast duke Przemysł I of Greater Poland, in 1260.

After several unsuccessful attempts by the Polish Piasts to regain control, the area along the lower Noteć was finally incorporated into the Brandeburg Neumark region. For centuries, the border with the Greater Polish Poznań Voivodeship ran between Drezdenko (Driesen) and Krzyż upstream in the east. Under the rule of Elector Joachim III Frederick of Brandenburg from about 1603, the fortress was rebuilt and further settlements were erected within the wetlands. First plans for a large-scale drainage and land amelioration were developed under King Frederick William I of Prussia in 1738/39, though not carried out until after the Seven Years' War in 1763.

After the First Partition of Poland in 1772 the adjacent Greater Polish lands up the river were annexed by the Kingdom of Prussia as the Netze District. The territory, created by the Prussian administration, was again ceded to newly established Duchy of Warsaw in 1807, but fell back to Prussia by resolution of the Vienna Congress in 1815.

== Towns ==
- Inowrocław
- Izbica Kujawska
- Kruszwica
- Pakość
- Barcin
- Labiszyn
- Nakło nad Notecią
- Ujście
- Czarnków
- Wieleń
- Krzyż Wielkopolski
- Drezdenko
- Village Santok near Gorzów Wielkopolski

== See also ==
- Rivers of Poland
