= Pyszkowo =

- Village
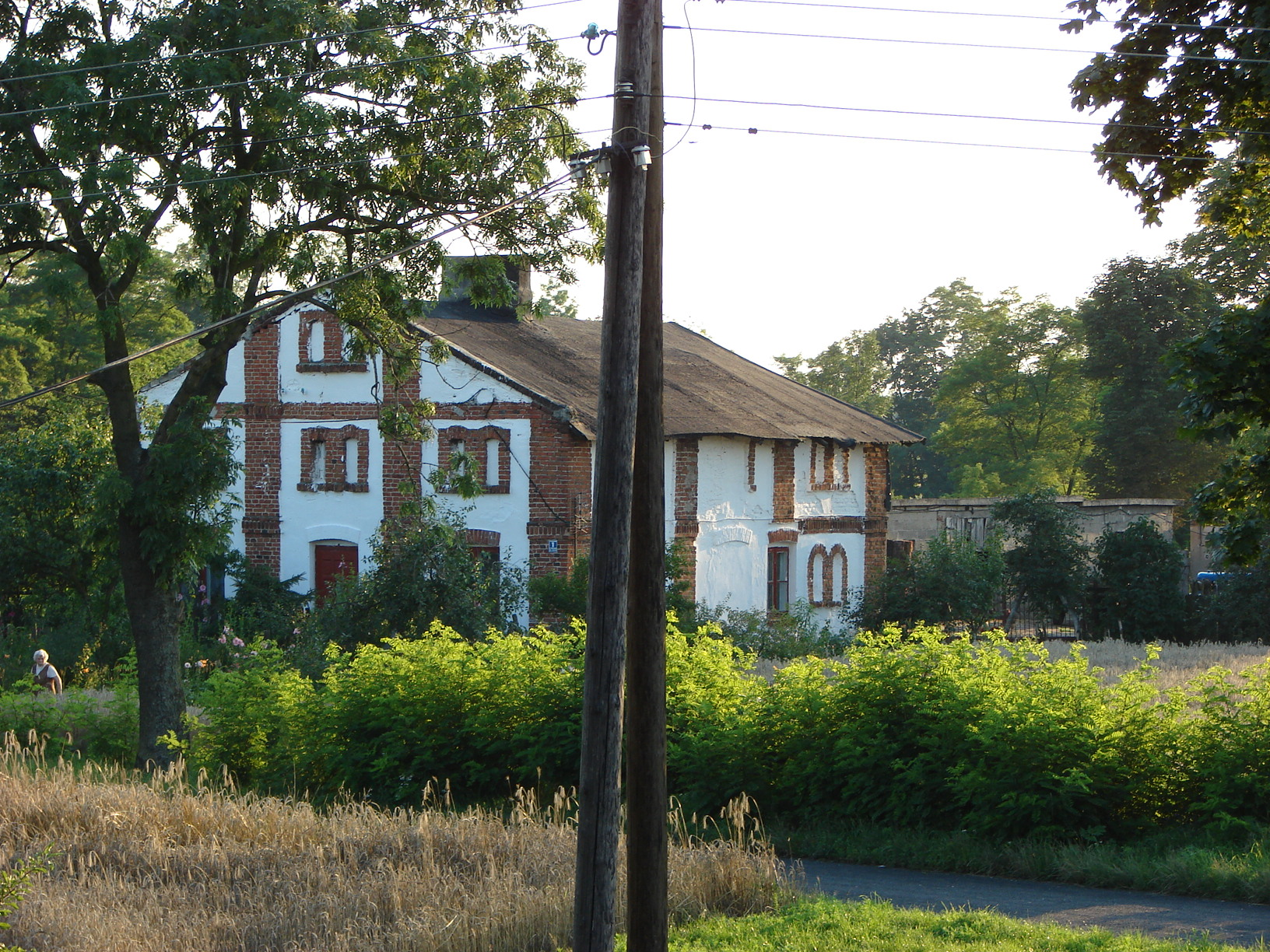
- Former granary.

- Location within Poland
- Coordinates: 52°26′N 18°57′E
- Country: Poland
- Voivodeship: Kuyavian-Pomeranian
- County: Włocławek
- Gmina: Chodecz

Pyszkowo [pɨʂˈkɔvɔ] is a village in the administrative district of Gmina Chodecz, within Włocławek County, Kuyavian-Pomeranian Voivodeship, in north-central Poland.
