= Zalesie, Włocławek County =

Zalesie
- Village
- Location within Poland
- Coordinates: 52°21′51″N 19°6′54″E
- Country: Poland
- Voivodeship: Kuyavian-Pomeranian
- County: Włocławek
- Gmina: Chodecz
- Time zone: UTC+1 (CET)
  - Summer (DST): UTC+2 (CEST)
- Vehicle registration: CWL

Zalesie [zaˈlɛɕɛ] is a village in the administrative district of Gmina Chodecz, within Włocławek County, Kuyavian-Pomeranian Voivodeship, in central Poland.
