= Niesiołów =

- Village
- Location within Poland
- Coordinates: 52°24′16″N 19°00′26″E
- Country: Poland
- Voivodeship: Kuyavian-Pomeranian
- County: Włocławek
- Gmina: Chodecz
- Population: 33

Niesiołów [ɲɛˈɕɔwuf] is a village in the administrative district of Gmina Chodecz, within Włocławek County, Kuyavian-Pomeranian Voivodeship, in north-central Poland.
