= Stanisław Kozierowski =

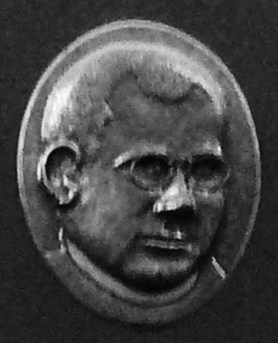
Stanisław Kozierowski

Stanisław Kozierowski (1874 – 1949) was a Polish Catholic priest and historian.

== Biography ==
Kozierowski was born in Tremessen (Province of Posen, Imperial Germany)(today Trzemeszno, Poland). He was a Catholic priest, professor and co-founder of the University of Poznan in 1919, also a member of the Polish Academy of Learning (Polska Akademia Umiejętności).

Kozierowski was specialised on the history of Greater Poland, Pomerania and the related aspects of Heraldic und Onomastic.

His most influential publication was the two-volume Atlas nazw geograficznych Słowiańszczyzny Zachodniej (Atlas of Geographical Names of Western Slavs), covering the toponym history of modern North-Western Poland and North-Eastern Germany. After World War II this atlas was often used by the Polish Committee for Settling of Place Names to determine Polish names for places and settlements in the Former eastern territories of Germany.

Kozierowski died in 1949 in Winna Góra.

== Publications ==
- Badania nazw topograficznych dzisiejszej archidyecezyi gnieźnieńskiej. (Poznań 1914)
- Badania nazw topograficznych dzisiejszej archidyecezyi poznańskiej. Tom I A-O (Poznańskie Towarzystwo Przyjaciół Nauk, Poznań 1916)
- Badania nazw topograficznych dzisiejszej archidyecezyi poznańskiej. Tom II P-Ż. Dodatek A-Ż (Poznańskie Towarzystwo Przyjaciół Nauk, Poznań 1916)
- Badania nazw topograficznych na obszarze dawnej zachodniej i środkowej Wielkopolski. Tom 1 A-Ł (Poznańskie Towarzystwo Przyjaciół Nauk, Poznań 1921)
- Badania nazw topograficznych na obszarze dawnej zachodniej i środkowej Wielkopolski. Tom 2 M-Z (Poznańskie Towarzystwo Przyjaciół Nauk, Poznań 1922)
- Pierwotne osiedlenie ziemi gnieźnieńskiej wraz z Pałukami w świetle nazw geograficznych i charakterystycznych imion rycerskich. (In: Slavia Occidentalis, t. III-IV 1923-24, s. 1-129. Uniwersytet Poznański, Poznań 1924)
- Pierwotne osiedlenie dorzecza Warty od Koła do Ujścia w świetle nazw geograficznych. (In: Slavia Occidentalis, t. V 1926, s. 112-246. Uniwersytet Poznański, Poznań 1926)
- Pierwotne osiedlenie pogranicza wielkopolsko-śląskiego między Obrą i Odrą a Wartą i Bobrem w świetle nazw geograficznych. (In: Slavia Occidentalis, t. VII 1928, s. 172-329. Uniwersytet Poznański, Poznań 1928)
- Atlas nazw geograficznych Słowiańszczyzny Zachodniej. Zeszyt I (Słupsk, Kołobrzeg, Szczecin, Piła; Nauka i Praca, Poznań 1934; Wydanie 2, Instytut Zachodni, Poznań 1945; Reprint, Archiwum Państwowe w Szczecinie, Szczecin 1990)
- Atlas nazw geograficznych Słowiańszczyzny Zachodniej. Zesz. II B (Nauka i Praca, Poznań 1935)
- Atlas nazw geograficznych Słowiańszczyzny Zachodniej. Zesz. II A (Strzałów, Utyń, Strzelce Nowe, Zwierzyn; Nauka i Praca, Poznań 1937)
