= Niwki, Włocławek County =

Niwki
- Village
- Location within Poland
- Coordinates: 52°26′25″N 19°00′04″E
- Country: Poland
- Voivodeship: Kuyavian-Pomeranian
- County: Włocławek
- Gmina: Chodecz
- Population: 45

Niwki [ˈnifki] is a village in the administrative district of Gmina Chodecz, within Włocławek County, Kuyavian-Pomeranian Voivodeship, in north-central Poland.
