= Sławęcin, Gmina Chodecz =

Sławęcin
- Village
- Location within Poland
- Coordinates: 52°22′43″N 19°06′33″E
- Country: Poland
- Voivodeship: Kuyavian-Pomeranian
- County: Włocławek
- Gmina: Chodecz
- Population: 20

Sławęcin [swaˈvɛnt͡ɕin] is a village in the administrative district of Gmina Chodecz, within Włocławek County, Kuyavian-Pomeranian Voivodeship, in north-central Poland.
