= Bogołomia-Kolonia =

- Village
- Location within Poland
- Coordinates: 52°22′56″N 19°01′15″E
- Country: Poland
- Voivodeship: Kuyavian-Pomeranian
- County: Włocławek
- Gmina: Chodecz
- Population: 14

Bogołomia-Kolonia [bɔɡɔˈwɔmja kɔˈlɔɲa] is a village in the administrative district of Gmina Chodecz, within Włocławek County, Kuyavian-Pomeranian Voivodeship, in north-central Poland.
