= Mała Noteć =

Location
- Country: Poland

Physical characteristics
- Source: Niedzięgiel
  - location: south of Popielarze, Gniezno County, Greater Poland Voivodeship
  - coordinates: 52°27′35″N 17°53′20″E
  - elevation: 103.2 m (339 ft)
- Mouth: Noteć
  - location: southeast of Pakość, Inowrocław County, Kuyavian–Pomeranian Voivodeship
  - coordinates: 52.8002°N 18.0924°E

Basin features
- Progression: Noteć→ Warta→ Oder→ Baltic Sea
- Tributaries
  - left: Panna

Mała Noteć is a river of Poland, a tributary of the Noteć in Pakość.
