= Stettin (disambiguation) =

Stettin is the German name of the city of Szczecin, Poland.

Stettin may also refer to:

== Places ==
- Stettin, Wisconsin, U.S., a town
  - Stettin (ghost town), Wisconsin, within the current town
- Stettin (region), a unit of territorial division in the Prussian Province of Pomerania 1816–1945
- Lagoon of Stettin or Stettin Bay, Szczecin Lagoon, a lagoon in the Oder estuary, shared by Germany and Poland
- Štítina (German: Stettin), a village in Moravian Silesia, the Czech Republic
- Stettin, a locality in Lac Ste. Anne County, Alberta, Canada
- Stettin Bay, a bay in West New Britain Province, Papua New Guinea

== Ships ==
- SMS Stettin, a light cruiser of the Imperial German Navy
- SS Stettin (1923), a German cargo ship
- SS Stettin (1925), a German cargo ship
- SS Stettin (1933), a German icebreaker

== People and characters ==
- Dinah Stettin or Dinah Shtettin, Yiddish theatre actress
- Stettin Palver, a fictional character in Isaac Asimov's Foundation Series

== See also ==
- Treaty of Stettin (1570), ending the Northern Seven Years' War
- Treaty of Stettin (1630), settling the conditions of Swedish occupation of the Duchy of Pomerania during the Thirty Years' War
- Treaty of Stettin (1653), settling territorial disputes of Brandenburg and Sweden in Pomerania after the Thirty Years' War
- Neu-Stettin or Szczecinek, a city in Poland
- Szczecin (disambiguation)
