= Kcyninka =

Location
- Country: Poland

Physical characteristics
- Mouth
  - location: Noteć
  - coordinates: 53°05′03″N 17°17′21″E

Basin features
- Progression: Noteć→ Warta→ Oder→ Baltic Sea

Kcyninka is a river of Poland, a tributary of the Noteć near Osiek nad Notecią.
