= Strzygi, Włocławek County =

Strzygi
- Village
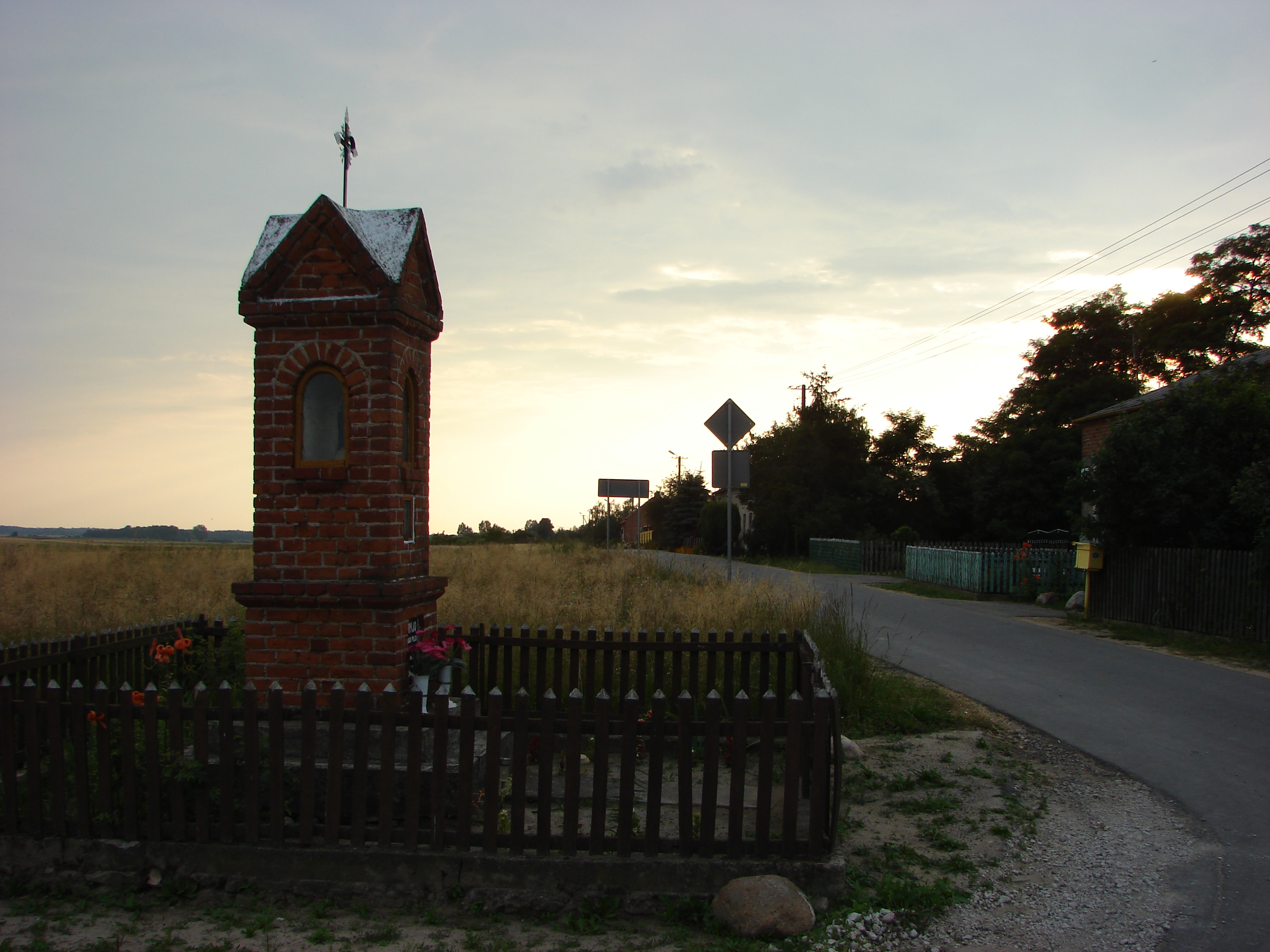
- The wayside shrine.

- Location within Poland
- Coordinates: 52°24′N 18°58′E
- Country: Poland
- Voivodeship: Kuyavian-Pomeranian
- County: Włocławek
- Gmina: Chodecz

Strzygi [ˈstʂɨɡi] is a village in the administrative district of Gmina Chodecz, within Włocławek County, Kuyavian-Pomeranian Voivodeship, in north-central Poland.
