= Psary, Kuyavian-Pomeranian Voivodeship =

Psary
- Village
- Location within Poland
- Coordinates: 52°21′11″N 19°02′33″E
- Country: Poland
- Voivodeship: Kuyavian-Pomeranian
- County: Włocławek
- Gmina: Chodecz

Psary [ˈpsarɨ] is a village in the administrative district of Gmina Chodecz, within Włocławek County, Kuyavian-Pomeranian Voivodeship, in north-central Poland.
