= Florkowizna =

- Village
- Location within Poland
- Coordinates: 52°23′55″N 19°3′45″E
- Country: Poland
- Voivodeship: Kuyavian-Pomeranian
- County: Włocławek
- Gmina: Chodecz
- Population: 20

Florkowizna [flɔrkɔˈvizna] is a village in the administrative district of Gmina Chodecz, within Włocławek County, Kuyavian-Pomeranian Voivodeship, in north-central Poland.
