= Łakno =

- Village
- Location within Poland
- Coordinates: 52°24′49″N 18°58′05″E
- Country: Poland
- Voivodeship: Kuyavian-Pomeranian
- County: Włocławek
- Gmina: Chodecz
- Population: 76

Łakno [ˈwaknɔ] is a village in the administrative district of Gmina Chodecz, within Włocławek County, Kuyavian-Pomeranian Voivodeship, in north-central Poland.
