= Piotrowo, Włocławek County =

Piotrowo
- Village
- Location within Poland
- Coordinates: 52°26′48″N 18°58′50″E
- Country: Poland
- Voivodeship: Kuyavian-Pomeranian
- County: Włocławek
- Gmina: Chodecz
- Population: 11

Piotrowo [pjɔˈtrɔvɔ] is a village in the administrative district of Gmina Chodecz, within Włocławek County, Kuyavian-Pomeranian Voivodeship, in north-central Poland.
