= Sadok, Kuyavian-Pomeranian Voivodeship =

Sadok
- Village
- Location within Poland
- Coordinates: 52°25′40″N 18°57′03″E
- Country: Poland
- Voivodeship: Kuyavian-Pomeranian
- County: Włocławek
- Gmina: Chodecz
- Population: 18

Sadok [ˈsadɔk] is a village in the administrative district of Gmina Chodecz, within Włocławek County, Kuyavian-Pomeranian Voivodeship, in north-central Poland.
