= Łanięta, Kuyavian-Pomeranian Voivodeship =

Łanięta
- Village
- Location within Poland
- Coordinates: 52°24′21″N 18°55′49″E
- Country: Poland
- Voivodeship: Kuyavian-Pomeranian
- County: Włocławek
- Gmina: Chodecz

Łanięta [waˈɲɛnta] is a village in the administrative district of Gmina Chodecz, within Włocławek County, Kuyavian-Pomeranian Voivodeship, in north-central Poland.
