= Gawin (surname) =

Gawin is a surname. Notable people with the surname include:

- August Gawin (1869–1945), Polish-born American politician
- Dariusz Gawin (born 1964), Polish historian and sociologist
- Jerzy Gawin (1922–1944), Polish scout master
- Tadeusz Gawin (born 1951), Belarusian Polish journalist and activist
