= Gulcz =

- Village
- Location within Poland
- Coordinates: 52°53′N 16°23′E
- Country: Poland
- Voivodeship: Greater Poland
- County: Czarnków-Trzcianka
- Gmina: Wieleń
- Population (approx.): 600

Gulcz [ɡult͡ʂ] is a village in the administrative district of Gmina Wieleń, within Czarnków-Trzcianka County, Greater Poland Voivodeship, in west-central Poland.

The village has an approximate population of 600.

== Twin towns – sister cities ==
Gulcz is twinned with:

- (United States) Stevens Point, USA
