= Łania, Kuyavian-Pomeranian Voivodeship =

Łania
- Village
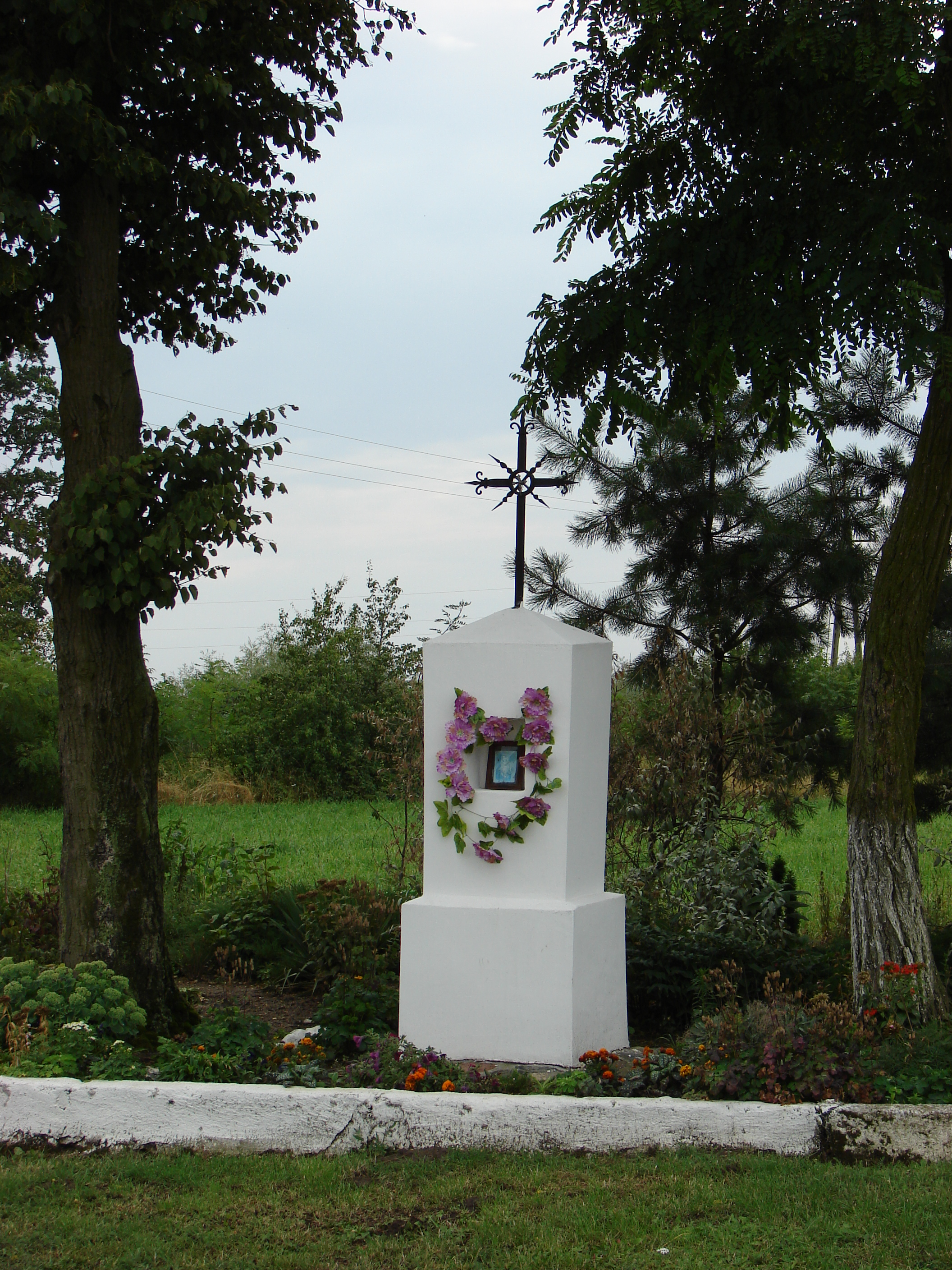
- The wayside shrine

- Location within Poland
- Coordinates: 52°25′N 18°56′E
- Country: Poland
- Voivodeship: Kuyavian-Pomeranian
- County: Włocławek
- Gmina: Chodecz

Łania [ˈwaɲa] is a village in the administrative district of Gmina Chodecz, within Włocławek County, Kuyavian-Pomeranian Voivodeship, in north-central Poland.
