= Trzemeszno =

Town in Greater Poland Voivodeship, Poland

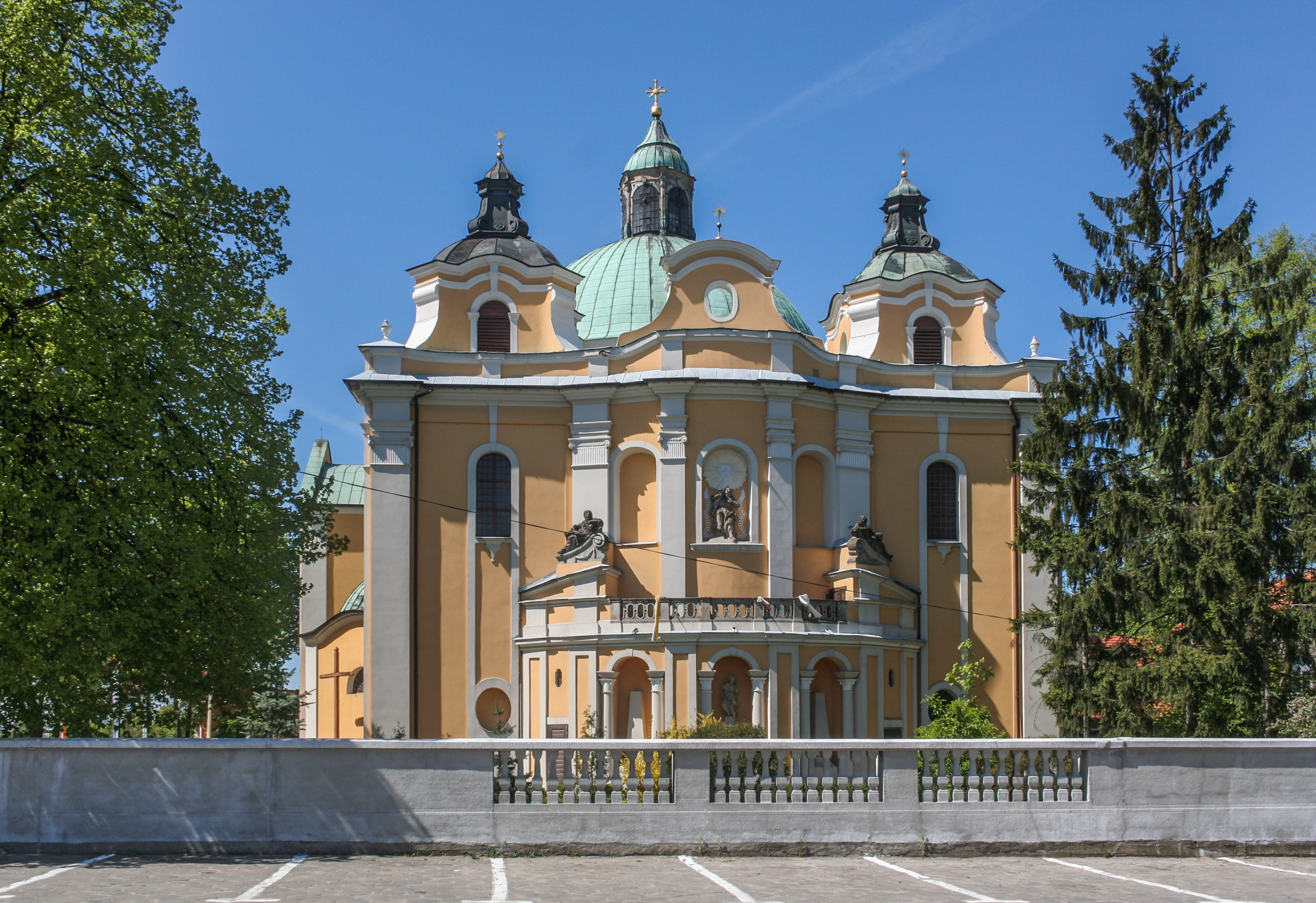
- Basilica

- Coat of arms

- Location within Poland
- Coordinates: 52°34′N 17°49′E
- Country: Poland
- Voivodeship: Greater Poland
- County: Gniezno
- Gmina: Trzemeszno
- Established: 10th century
- Town rights: 1382

Government
  - Mayor: Kacper Lipiński

Area
  - Total: 5.46 km^{2} (2.11 sq mi)

Population (2006)
  - Total: 7,789
  - Density: 1,430/km^{2} (3,690/sq mi)
- Time zone: UTC+1 (CET)
  - Summer (DST): UTC+2 (CEST)
- Postal code: 62-240
- Area code: +48 61
- Car plates: PGN
- Climate: Dfb
- Website: http://www.trzemeszno.pl

Trzemeszno [tʂɛˈmɛʂnɔ] is a town in Gniezno County in Greater Poland Voivodeship, west-central Poland. It is situated on the eastern shore of the Popielewskie Lake, and is one of the oldest settlements in the region.

== Etymology ==
The town's name derives from an Old Polish word Trzemcha meaning the flower of the "Bird’s Cherry" plant, which once grew in the vicinity.

== History ==
=== Medieval and early modern period ===
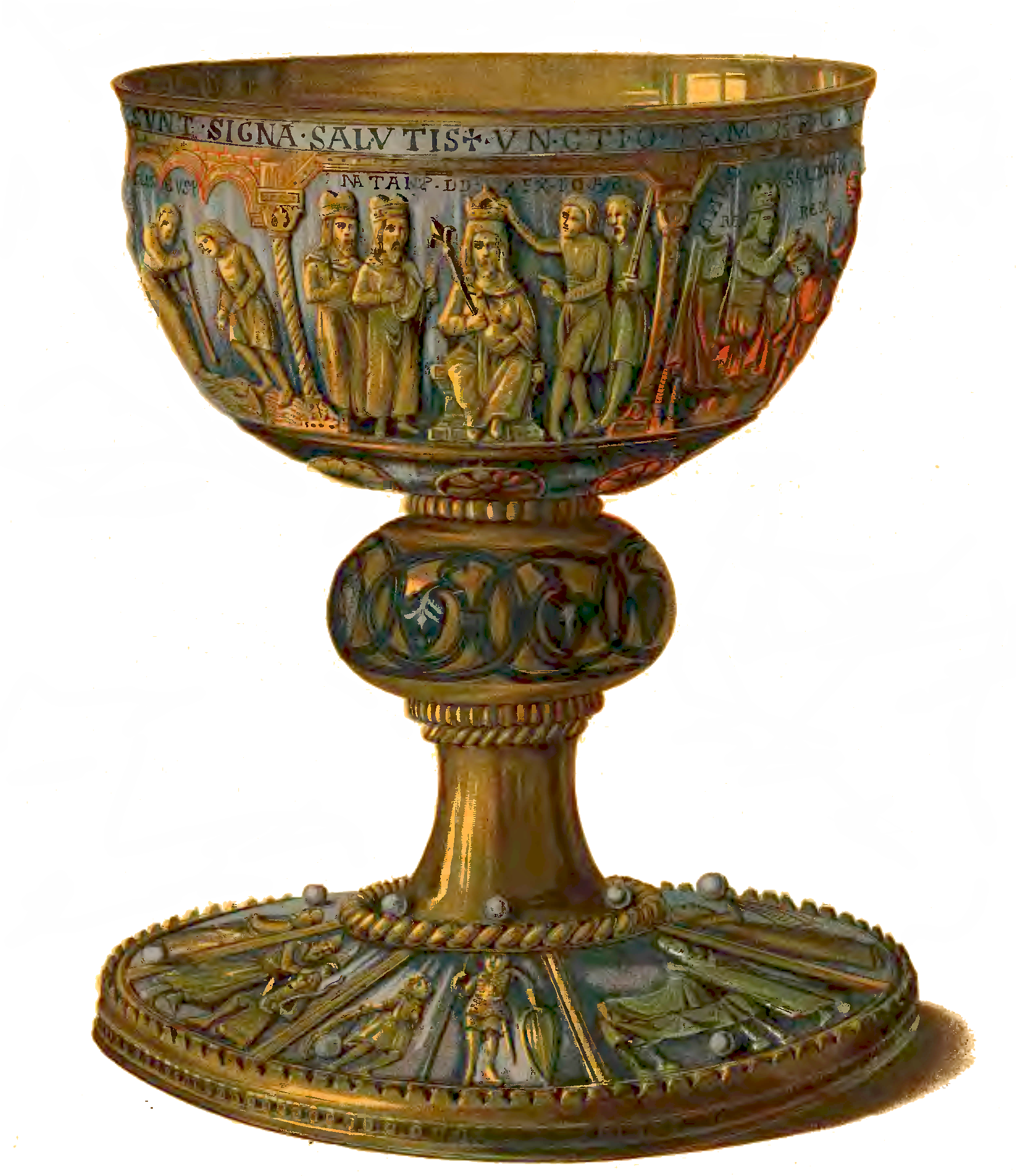
12th-century Royal chalice from Trzemeszno

Around the 10th century, a kind of defensive settlement was created here. It soon changed its function into a market settlement. It was significant that the town lay on the trade route joining Greater Poland with northern Masovia and Pomerelia.

In the 12th century, Trzemeszno became a property of the monastery of Canons regular of St. Augustine. The monks were brought there by Duke Bolesław III Wrymouth. Trzemeszno received its town rights before 1382. It was a private church town, administratively located in the Gniezno County in the Kalisz Voivodeship in the Greater Poland Province of the Kingdom of Poland.

From the second half of the 17th century, there began a decline of the town caused by the Swedish invasion of Poland (Deluge) and plagues. In 1766, there were only 15 houses left in Trzemeszno. However, soon the town started to develop rapidly. An important period in town's history is due to the activity of Michał Kościesza Kosmowski, who was the monastery abbot (1761–1804). He founded the "New Town" – a suburb, where cloth makers were settled, and St. Michael's suburb for other craftsmen. Kosmowski founded also several buildings of public services: Collegium Tremesnensis a secondary school (currently Liceum Ogólnokształcące im. Michała Kosmowskiego), hospital and a new brewery. The Polish patriot, Jan Kiliński, was born here in 1760. In 1791, there were 144 buildings in the town and almost 1,000 people lived there. The main activities of the residents were connected to crafts, trade and framing. The enterprise, which took up artistic challenges, was rebuilding and changing into baroque style of the monastery church. The work was finished in 1791 when the church was consecrated.

=== Late modern period ===
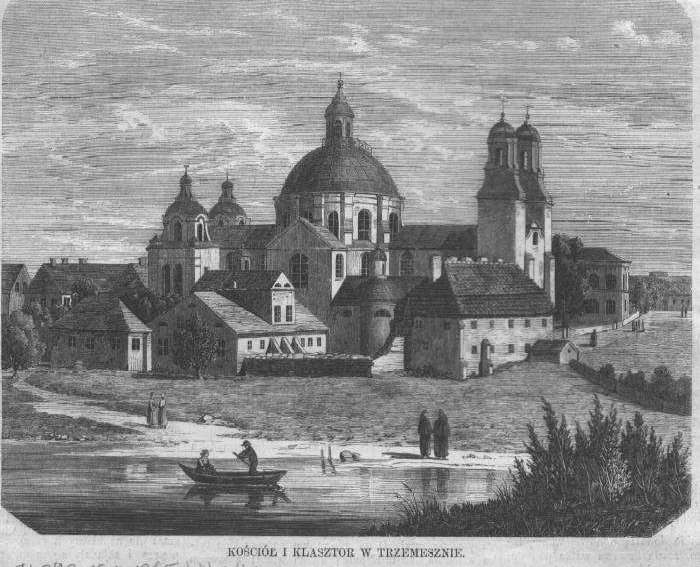
19th-century view of the church and monastery

In 1793, during the Second Partition of Poland, Trzemeszno was annexed by Prussia. Following the successful Greater Poland uprising of 1806, it was regained by Poles and included within the short-lived Duchy of Warsaw. After the duchy's dissolution in 1815, it was re-annexed by Prussia and incorporated into the newly formed Grand Duchy of Posen (Poznań). In 1836, the Prussian government secularized the monastery. In 1848 Trzemeszno became one of the main centers of the Polish Greater Poland uprising against Prussia, and was the site of a battle, won by the Poles. The town's residents (including many students) were also involved in the January Uprising (1863). Trzemeszno's secondary school has traditions of participating in national liberation fights. In 1844, a secret society of students called Sarmatia formed, and from 1861 the national society Zan was active.

In 1865, a Loan Bank (Kasa Pożyczkowa) and in 1874 an Industrial Society (Towarzystwo Przemysłowe) were founded in Trzemeszno. The latter was significant for culture and education. Around 1880, a branch of Towarzystwo Czytelni Ludowych ("Society of Public Reading Rooms") and in 1894 the Gymnastic Society Sokół were founded.

Opening a railway line in 1872 joining Trzemeszno with Poznań, Toruń and Inowrocław had contributed to the town's development.

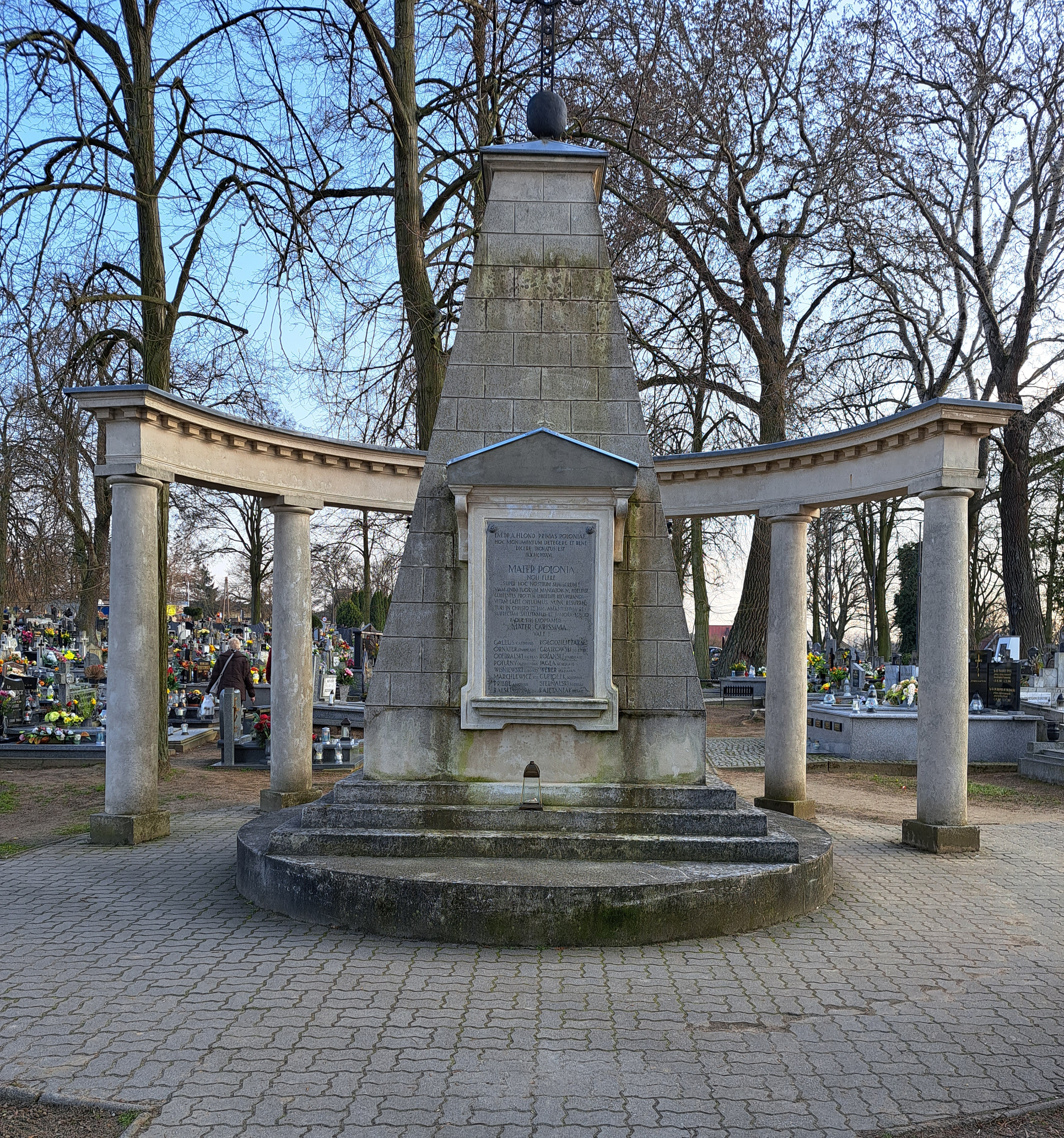
Mausoleum of the insurgents of the Greater Poland Uprising of 1918–1919

At the end of World War I, in the early days of the Greater Poland Uprising, the Polish residents of Trzemeszno took control of their town on 29 December 1918; the town was confirmed part of newly reconstituted Poland in the following months. Five insurgents from the town died in the uprising. The first years in free Poland were good for developing trade and crafts. However the situation was complicated by inflation, unemployment and economical crisis. Despite these problems, cultural and educational life flourished. Many events were organized by local societies and organizations. There was a cinema, and in 1937 the local weekly newspaper “Kosynier” began to be published. Secondary school played an important role in local culture.

=== World War II ===
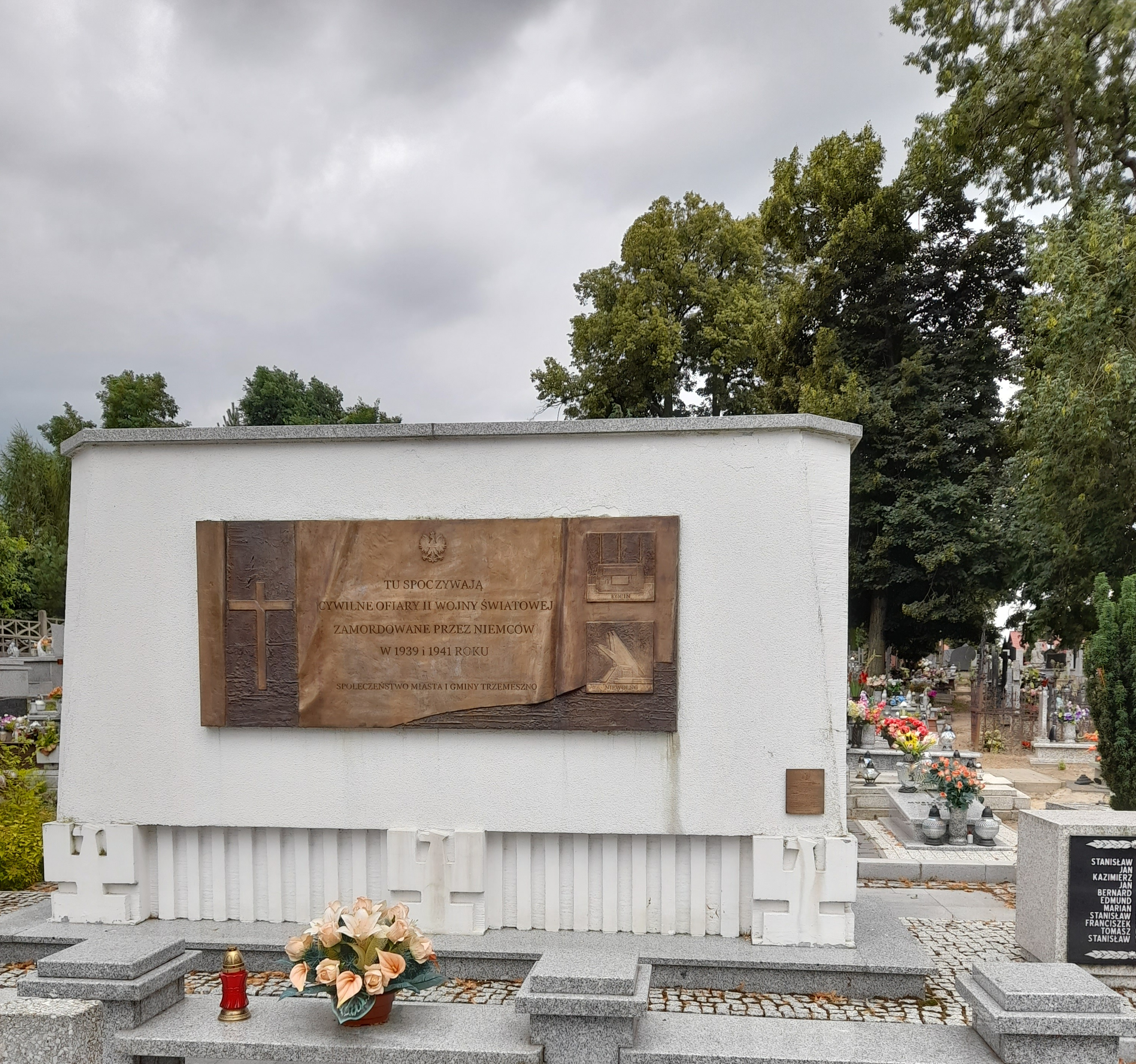
Mass grave of Polish civilians murdered by the German occupiers in World War II

During the German invasion of Poland at the start of World War II, it was the site of Polish defense, and on 11 September 1939 German troops carried out a massacre of dozens of Polish defenders in the town (see Nazi crimes against the Polish nation). Soon afterwards, the Germans carried out mass arrests of local notable Poles during the genocidal Intelligenzaktion campaign. In late 1939, the occupiers carried out expulsions of Poles, mainly families of massacred Polish defenders and families of Poles who were murdered or deported to concentration camps during the Intelligenzaktion. Expelled Poles were deported to the General Government in the more eastern part of German-occupied Poland, while their houses, shops and workshops were handed over to German colonists as part of the Lebensraum policy. The Germans renamed the town to Tremessen. A pre-war monument to Polish insurgents of the Greater Poland uprising was destroyed, and schools, libraries and the church were closed. Several Poles who were either born or lived and worked in Trzemeszno, including participants of the Greater Poland uprising of 1918–1919 and Polish–Soviet War of 1919–1921, were murdered by the Russians in the Katyn massacre in 1940.

Terrorized residents did not remain passive. There were local units of the Home Army and Grey Ranks secret resistance organizations. Artur Baumgart, commander of the local Home Army unit, and organizers of the Grey Ranks unit were arrested by the Germans in 1942–1943, and eventually sentenced to death and executed. In Trzemeszno, Polish resistance members from other places were imprisoned and sentenced to death.

Historical population
Year	Pop.	±%
1875	4,300	—
1880	4,439	+3.2%
1921	5,093	+14.7%
1931	5,218	+2.5%
2010	7,807	+49.6%

=== Recent period ===
After 1945, residents of Trzemeszno faced many difficult tasks. "Citizen Committees" were responsible for restoring closed enterprises and community services. The greatest challenge was restoration of the basilica church and secondary school which had been burned down by retreating German troops.

Rapid development of Trzemeszno took place in the 1960s and 1970s. The largest enterprise, employing over 1,000 people, was Pomorskie Zakłady Materiałów Izolacyjnych "Izopol" (factory producing insulation materials). Izopol played an important role as a financial supporter and developer of the town.

In 1975–1998, it was administratively located in the Bydgoszcz Voivodeship. In 1999, due to the administrative reform of Poland, Trzemeszno became a part of the Gniezno powiat and the Greater Poland Voivodeship.

== Transport ==
Trzemeszno lies on national road 15 which connects it to Gniezno and Inowrocław.

Trzemeszno has a station on the important Poznań-Toruń railway line.

== Notable residents ==
- Stanisław Kozierowski (1874–1949), historian

== Gallery ==
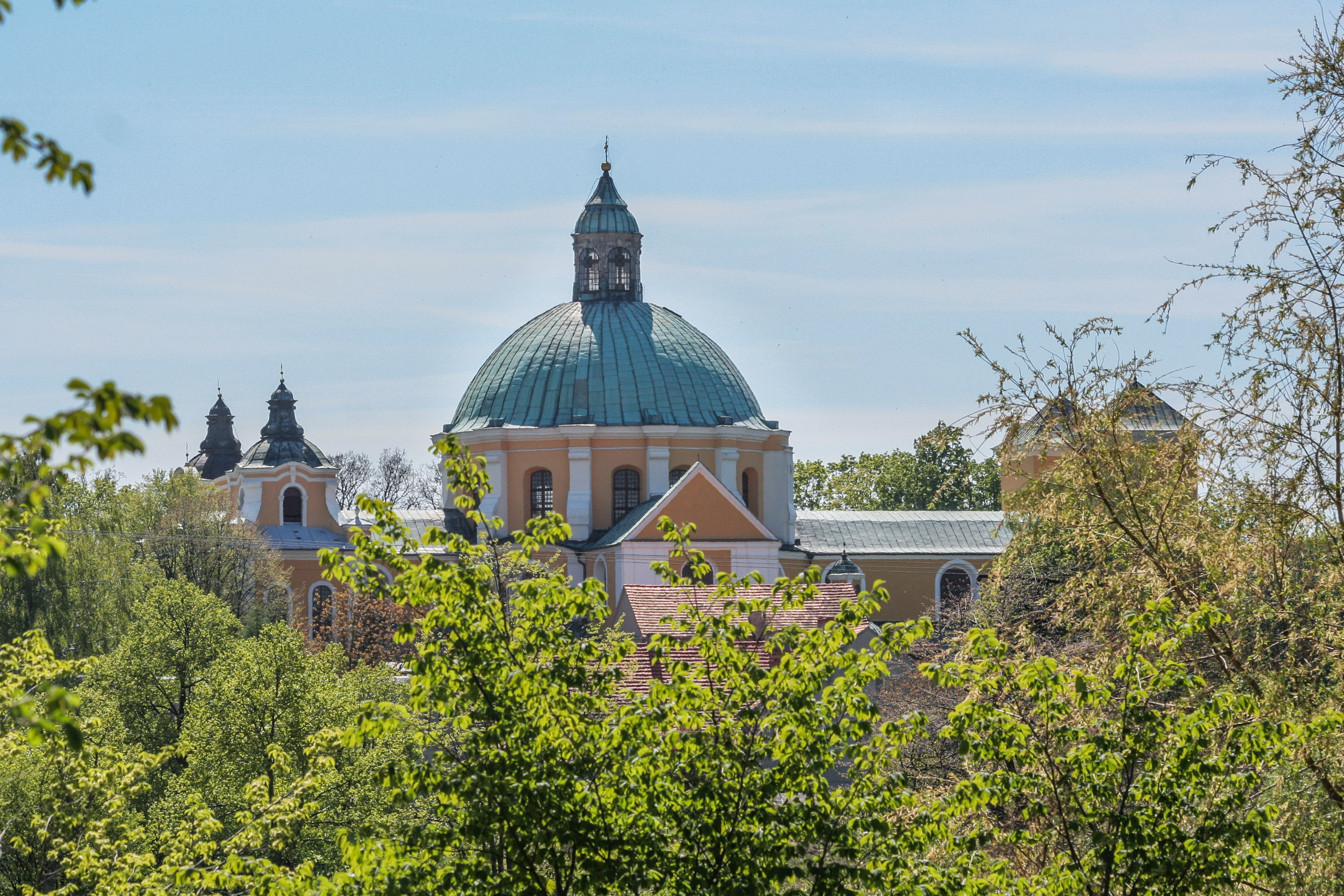
Basilica of St. Mary and St. Michael, former Regular Canonics church

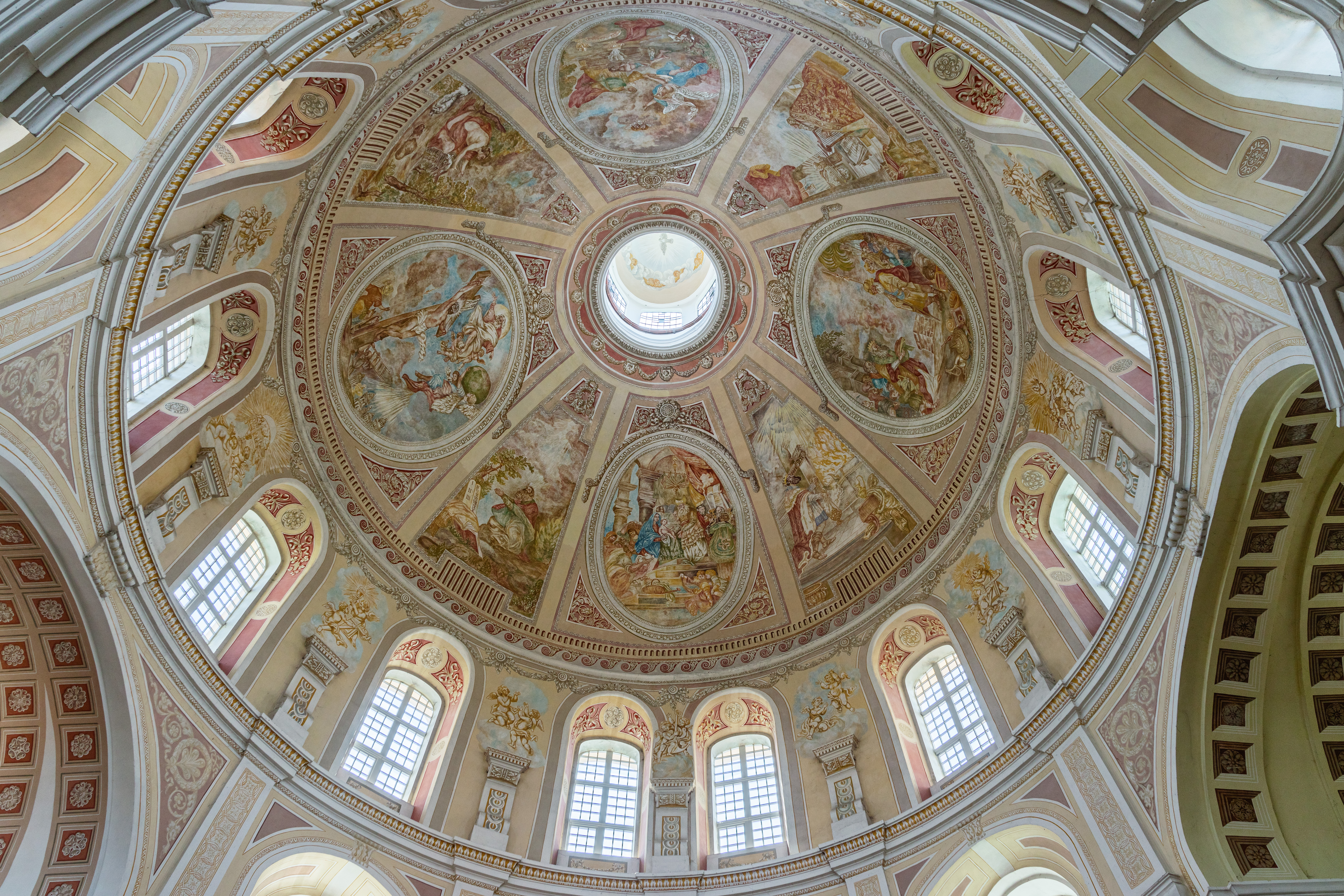
Basilica interior

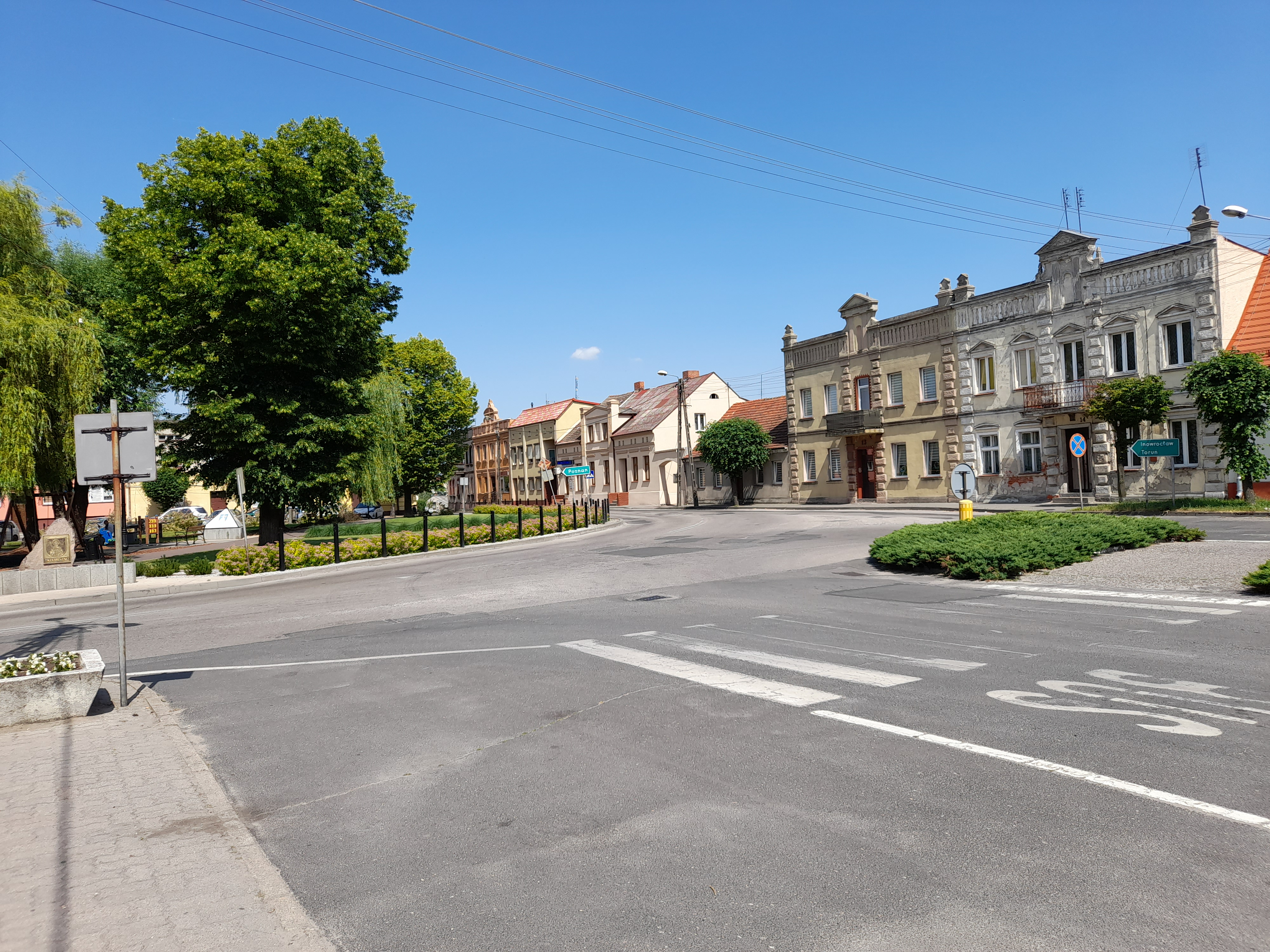
Plac Świętego Wojciecha (Saint Adalbert Square)

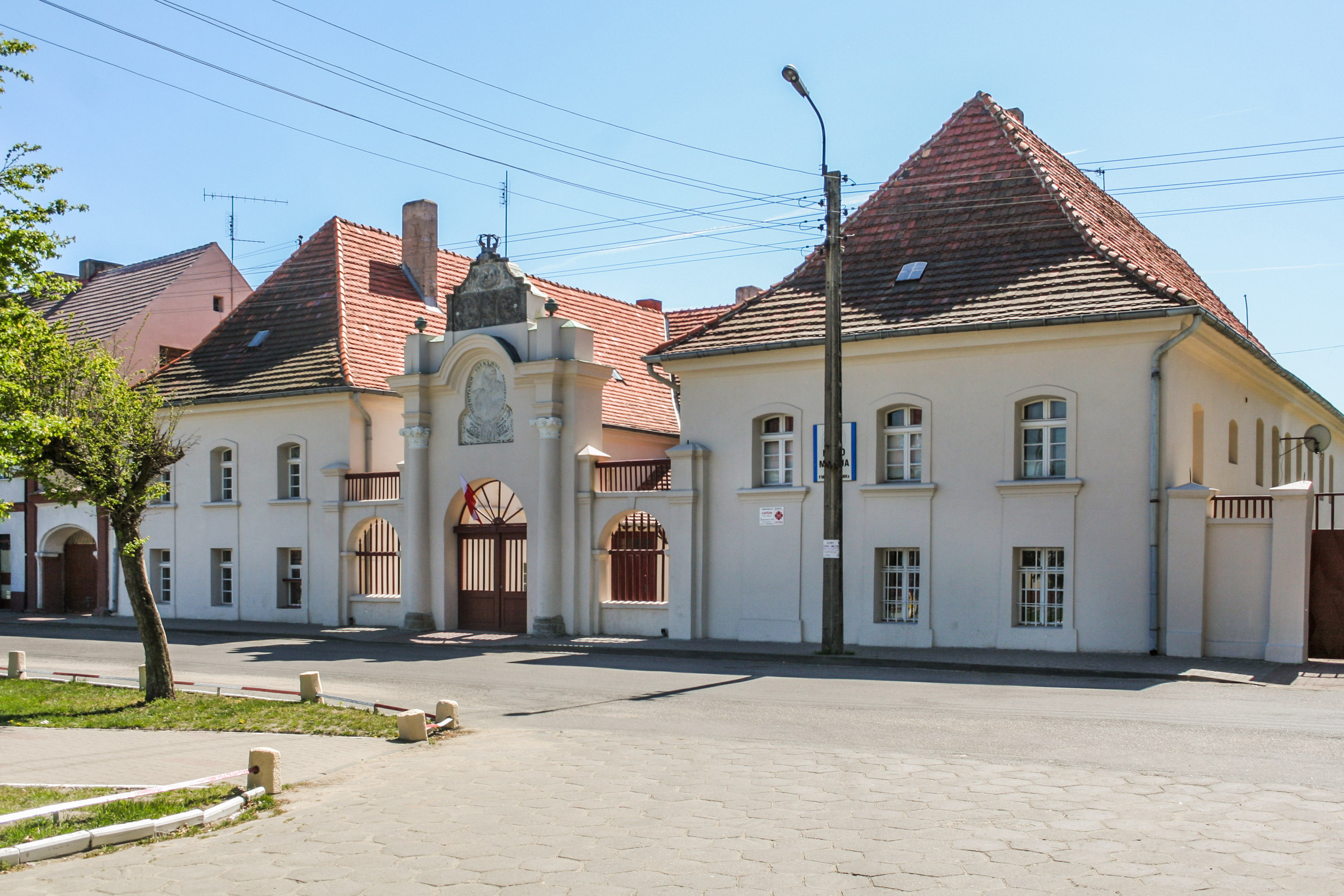
Liceum Ogólnokształcące im. Michała Kosmowskiego, high school est. in the 18th century

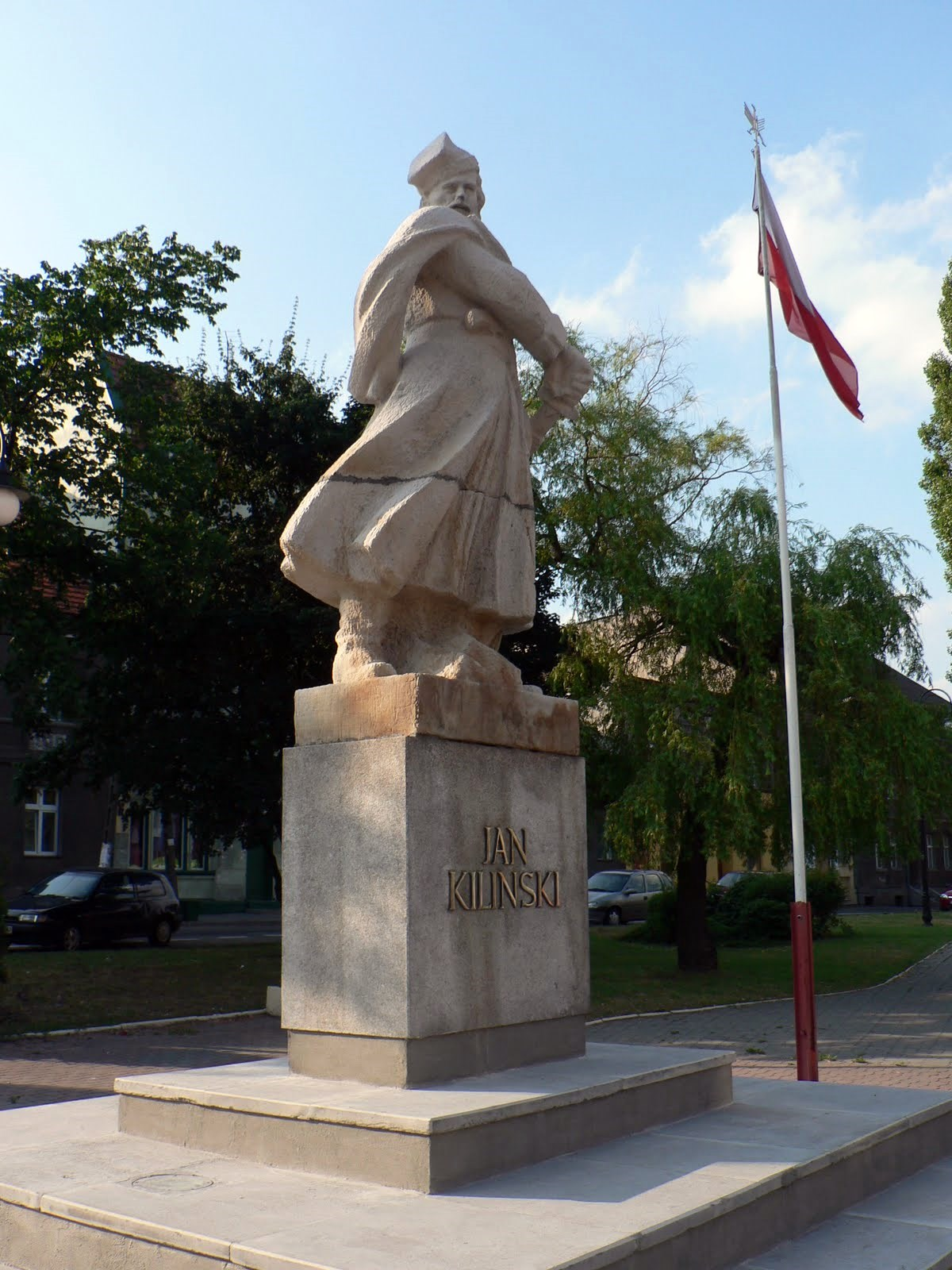
Jan Kiliński Monument
