= Gmina Chodecz =

Gmina Chodecz Chodecz Commune
- Gmina
- Flag Coat of arms
- Interactive map of Gmina Chodecz
- Coordinates (Chodecz): 52°24′19″N 19°1′42″E
- Country: Poland
- Voivodeship: Kuyavian-Pomeranian
- County: Włocławek County
- Seat: Chodecz

Area
  - Total: 122.23 km^{2} (47.19 sq mi)

Population (2006)
  - Total: 6,395
  - Density: 52.32/km^{2} (135.5/sq mi)
  - Urban: 1,936
  - Rural: 4,459
- Time zone: UTC+1 (CET)
  - Summer (DST): UTC+2 (CEST)
- Vehicle registration: CWL
- Website: http://www.chodecz.pl/

Gmina Chodecz is an urban-rural gmina (administrative district) in Włocławek County, Kuyavian-Pomeranian Voivodeship, in central Poland. Its seat is the town of Chodecz, which lies approximately 28 kilometres (17 mi) south of Włocławek and 76 km (47 mi) south of Toruń.

The gmina covers an area of 122.23 square kilometres (47.2 sq mi), and as of 2006 its total population is 6,395 (out of which the population of Chodecz amounts to 1,936, and the population of the rural part of the gmina is 4,459).

== Villages ==
Apart from the town of Chodecz, Gmina Chodecz contains the villages and settlements of Bogołomia, Bogołomia-Kolonia, Brzyszewo, Cetty, Chodeczek, Chodeczek-Wieś, Florkowizna, Gawin, Huta Chodecka, Huta Towarzystwo, Ignalin, Kołatki, Kromszewice, Kubłowo, Kubłowo Małe, Łakno, Łania, Łanięta, Lubieniec, Micielno, Mielinek, Mielno, Mstowo, Niesiołów, Niwki, Nowiny, Ogorzelewo, Pieleszki, Piotrowo, Podgórze, Prosno, Przysypka, Psary, Pyszkowo, Ruda Lubieniecka, Sadok, Sławęcin, Sobiczewy, Strzygi, Strzyżki, Szczecin, Trzeszczon, Uklejnica, Wola Adamowa, Zalesie, Zbijewo and Zieleniewo.

== Neighbouring gminas ==
Gmina Chodecz is bordered by the gminas of Boniewo, Choceń, Dąbrowice, Lubień Kujawski and Przedecz.
