= Gawin, Kuyavian-Pomeranian Voivodeship =

Gawin
- Village
- Location within Poland
- Coordinates: 52°25′27″N 18°57′23″E
- Country: Poland
- Voivodeship: Kuyavian-Pomeranian
- County: Włocławek
- Gmina: Chodecz

Gawin [ˈɡavin] is a village in the administrative district of Gmina Chodecz, located within Włocławek County, Kuyavian-Pomeranian Voivodeship, in north-central Poland.
