= Prosno, Kuyavian-Pomeranian Voivodeship =

Prosno
- Village
- Location within Poland
- Coordinates: 52°23′N 19°6′E
- Country: Poland
- Voivodeship: Kuyavian-Pomeranian
- County: Włocławek
- Gmina: Chodecz
- Population: 49

Prosno [ˈprɔsnɔ] is a village in the administrative district of Gmina Chodecz, within Włocławek County, Kuyavian-Pomeranian Voivodeship, in north-central Poland. The village is part of the historic region of Kuyavia.
