= Szczecin, Kuyavian-Pomeranian Voivodeship =

Szczecin
- Village
- Location within Poland
- Coordinates: 52°21′43″N 19°0′36″E
- Country: Poland
- Voivodeship: Kuyavian-Pomeranian
- County: Włocławek
- Gmina: Chodecz

Szczecin (Polish: [ˈʂtʂɛtɕin]) is a village in the administrative district of Gmina Chodecz, within Włocławek County, Kuyavian-Pomeranian Voivodeship, in north-central Poland.
