= List of recipients of the Order of the Smile =

This is the list of the recipients of the Order of the Smile:

- Abdullah of Saudi Arabia
- Bartosz Arłukowicz
- Tadeusz Balcerowski
- Agniya Barto
- Gerhard Behrendt
- Nina Bichuya
- Maria Biliżanka
- Ewa Błaszczyk
- Wanda Błeńska
- Jakub Błaszczykowski
- Henryk Borowski
- Marek Borowski
- Assen Bossev
- Bohdan Butenko
- Czesław Centkiewicz
- Bernadette Chirac
- Henryk Chmielewski
- Wanda Chotomska
- Václav Čtvrtek
- Jacek Cygan
- Tibor Czorba
- 14th Dalai Lama
- Wiktor Dega
- Janusz Dobrosz
- Anna Dymna
- Joni Eareckson Tada
- Joanna Fabisiak
- Krystyna Feldman
- Arkady Fiedler
- Benjamin Fiore, SJ
- Pope Francis
- Piotr Fronczewski
- Stanley H. Fryczynski Jr.
- Dora Gabe
- Janina Garścia
- Niki Goulandris
- Henryk Gulbinowicz
- Andrzej Gut-Mostowy
- Judit Halász
- Dagmar Havlová
- Zbigniew Herman
- Mirosław Hermaszewski
- Gavriil Ilizarov
- Tadeusz Isakowicz-Zaleski
- Stanisław Jankowski
- Alina Janowska
- Éva Janikovszky
- Tove Jansson
- Otylia Jędrzejczak
- Ignacy Jeż
- Majka Jeżowska
- Michał Józefczyk
- Pope John Paul II
- Irena Jurgielewiczowa
- Bogusław Kaczyński
- Eunice Kennedy Shriver
- Zygmunt Kęstowicz
- Ian Kiernan
- Leon Knabit, OSB
- Hilary Koprowski
- Marek Kotański
- Maria Kownacka
- Vyacheslav Kotyonochkin
- Paweł Kukiz
- Dominika Kulczyk
- Jacek Kuroń
- Jolanta Kwaśniewska
- Aleksander Kwaśniewski
- Irena Kwiatkowska
- Henry Richardson Labouisse Jr.
- Zbigniew Lengren
- Robert Lewandowski
- Astrid Lindgren
- Franciszek Macharski
- Halina Machulska
- Peter Maffay
- Ivan Malkovych
- Nelson Mandela
- Alina Margolis-Edelman
- Anđelka Martić
- Robert Mayer
- Marek Michalak
- Sergey Mikhalkov
- Leszek Miller
- Anna Mkapa
- Małgorzata Musierowicz
- Anne, Princess Royal
- Moza bint Nasser
- Władysław Nehrebecki
- Edmund Niziurski
- Józef Nowak
- Sergey Obraztsov
- Wiesław Ochman
- Janina Ochojska
- Jerzy Owsiak
- Hanna Ożogowska
- Ryszard Pacławski
- Stanisław Pagaczewski
- Farah Pahlavi
- Waldemar Pawlak
- Marek Plura
- Jerzy Przybylski
- Janusz Przymanowski
- Abdullah bin Abdulaziz Al Rabeeah
- Zbigniew Religa
- J. K. Rowling
- Viktar Shalkevich
- K. Shankar Pillai
- James Rutka
- Zbigniew Rychlicki
- Sue Ryder
- Ryszard Rynkowski
- Irena Santor
- Irena Sendler
- Queen Silvia of Sweden
- Sargent Shriver
- Stanisław Skalski
- Henryk Skarżyński
- Adam Słodowy
- Steven Spielberg
- Jerzy Stuhr
- Jan Szczepański
- Ewa Szelburg-Zarembina
- Alfred Szklarski
- Mother Teresa
- Jan Twardowski
- Eleni Tzoka
- Peter Ustinov
- Mariele Ventre
- Kurt Waldheim
- David Weinstein, MD
- Oprah Winfrey
- Maciej Wojtyszko
- Marian Woronin
- Sarah, Duchess of York
- Malala Yousafzai
- Faye Simanjuntak
- Rolf Zuckowski
- Wojciech Żukrowski

The youngest Knight to ever receive the Order of the Smile is Malala Yousafzai, who was awarded the order in 2016, then aged 19. The oldest was Irena Sendler in 2007, aged 97.
