= Tomek =

Tomek is a Polish-language masculine given name, a diminutive of Tomasz. It may also serve as a surname.

The name may refer to:

== Given name ==
- Tomek Baginski (born 1976), a Polish illustrator, animator and director
- Tomek Bartoszyński (born 1957), Polish-American mathematician who works in set theory
- Tomek Bork (born 1952), Polish actor, working in the United Kingdom since the early 1980s
- Tomek Iwan (born 1971), Polish former professional footballer
- Tomek Makowiecki (born 1983), Polish musician, singer and songwriter
- Tomek Valtonen (born 1980), Polish-born Finnish former professional ice hockey forward
- Tomek Wilmowski, series of nine youth adventure novels written by Polish author Alfred Szklarski

=== Fictional characters ===
- Tomek from Kasia i Tomek a Quebec comedy television series
- Tomek Ovadya Morah or T. O. Morrow, comic book supervillain published by DC Comics

== Surname ==
- Ferdinand Frederick Tomek, the namesake of the F. F. Tomek House, an example of Frank Lloyd Wright's prairie house
- Václav Vladivoj Tomek (1818–1905) – Czech historian
- Eduard Tomek (1912–2001) – Czech-Austrian painter
- Václav Tomek (1942–2022) – Czech historian
- Ellen Tomek (born 1984), American rower
- Erich Tomek (1930–2025), Austrian screenwriter, film producer and production manager
- Martin Tomek (born 1969), Czech football goaltender
- Tomáš Tomek (born 1988), Slovak ice hockey player

== See also ==
- Tomášek
- Tomíček
