= Tomíček =

Tomíček (feminine: Tomíčková) is a Czech surname, derived from the given name Tomáš. Notable people with the surname include:

- Jan Slavomír Tomíček (1806–1866), Czech writer, journalist and historian
- Luboš Tomíček Sr. (1934–1968), Czech speedway rider
- Luboš Tomíček Jr. (born 1986), Czech speedway rider

== See also ==
- Tomczak
- Tomášek
- Tomčić
