= Jan Güntner =

Polish stage and film actor and theatre director (born 1931)

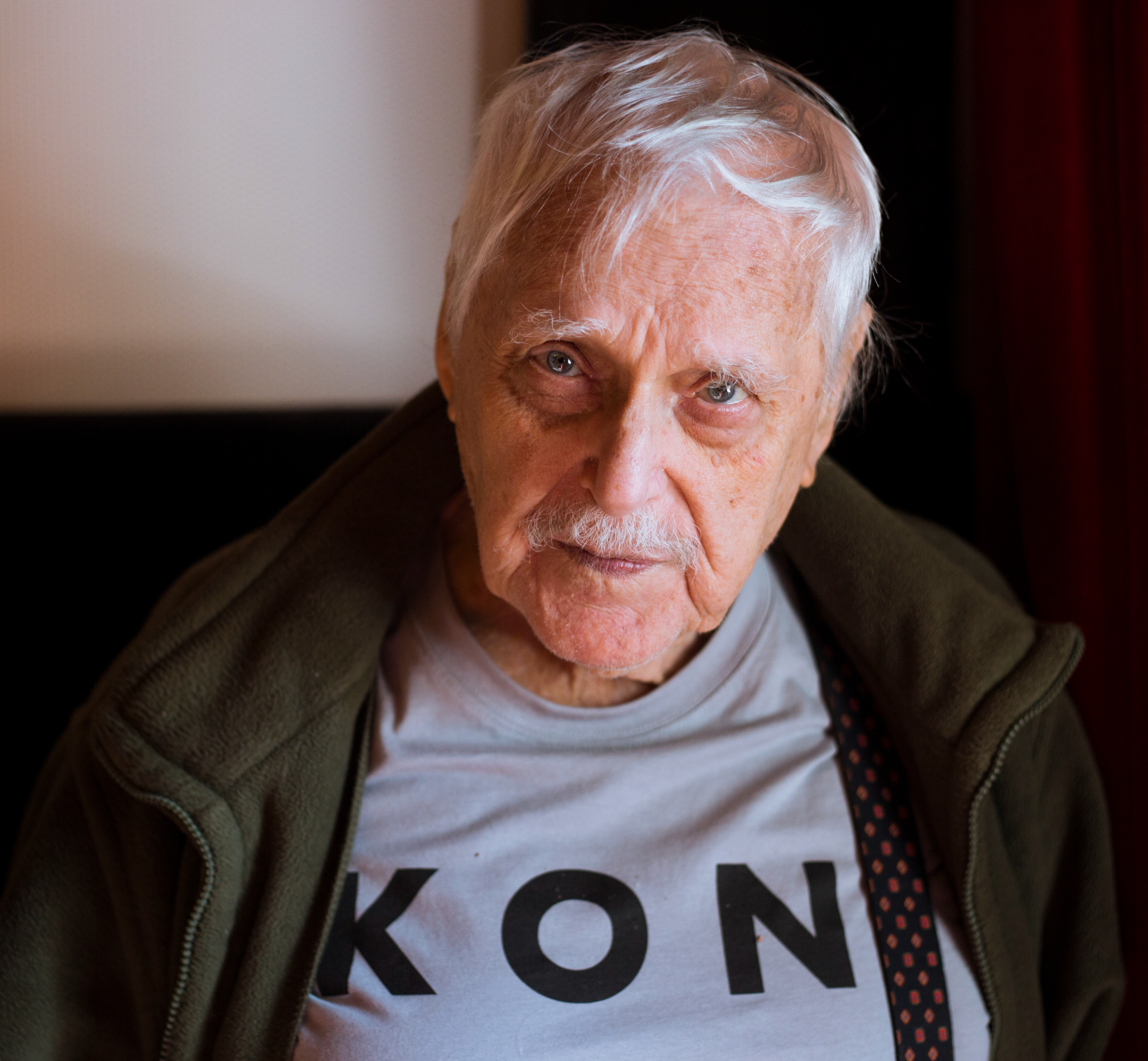
- Jan Güntner, 2018
- Born: 17 June 1931 (age 95)
- Citizenship: Polish
- Education: State College of Acting in Kraków
- Occupation: actor

Jan Władysław Güntner (born 17 June 1931) is a Polish actor, theatre director and activist.

== Biography ==
He was a cousin of Jerzy Nowak. He graduated from the State College of Acting in Kraków in 1953. There, his teachers included Adam Polewka, Władysław Krzemiński, Władysław Józef Dobrowolski, Władysław Woźnik and Kazimierz Meierhold. Since the beginning of Piwnica pod Baranami activity in 1958 he was a regular participant of the cabaret, he was the first to declaim poems by his friend Andrzej Bursa on the stage.

Jan Güntner made his first steps in acting at Teatr Młodego Widza (the Young Viewer Theatre) led by Maria Biliżanka. He was an actor of Ludowy Theatre (1958–1971), National Stary Theatre (1972–1973; 1982–2000; guest starring 2005) and Bagatela Theatre (1976–1982). He starred in more than twenty plays of Teatr Telewizji.

In 2000 he was awarded by President of Poland Aleksander Kwaśniewski with an Officer's Cross of the Order of Polonia Restituta.

He was a member and vice-chairman of Kuźnica. He was married to Anna Güntner until her death in 2013. He befriended Jerzy Vetulani.

== Filmography ==
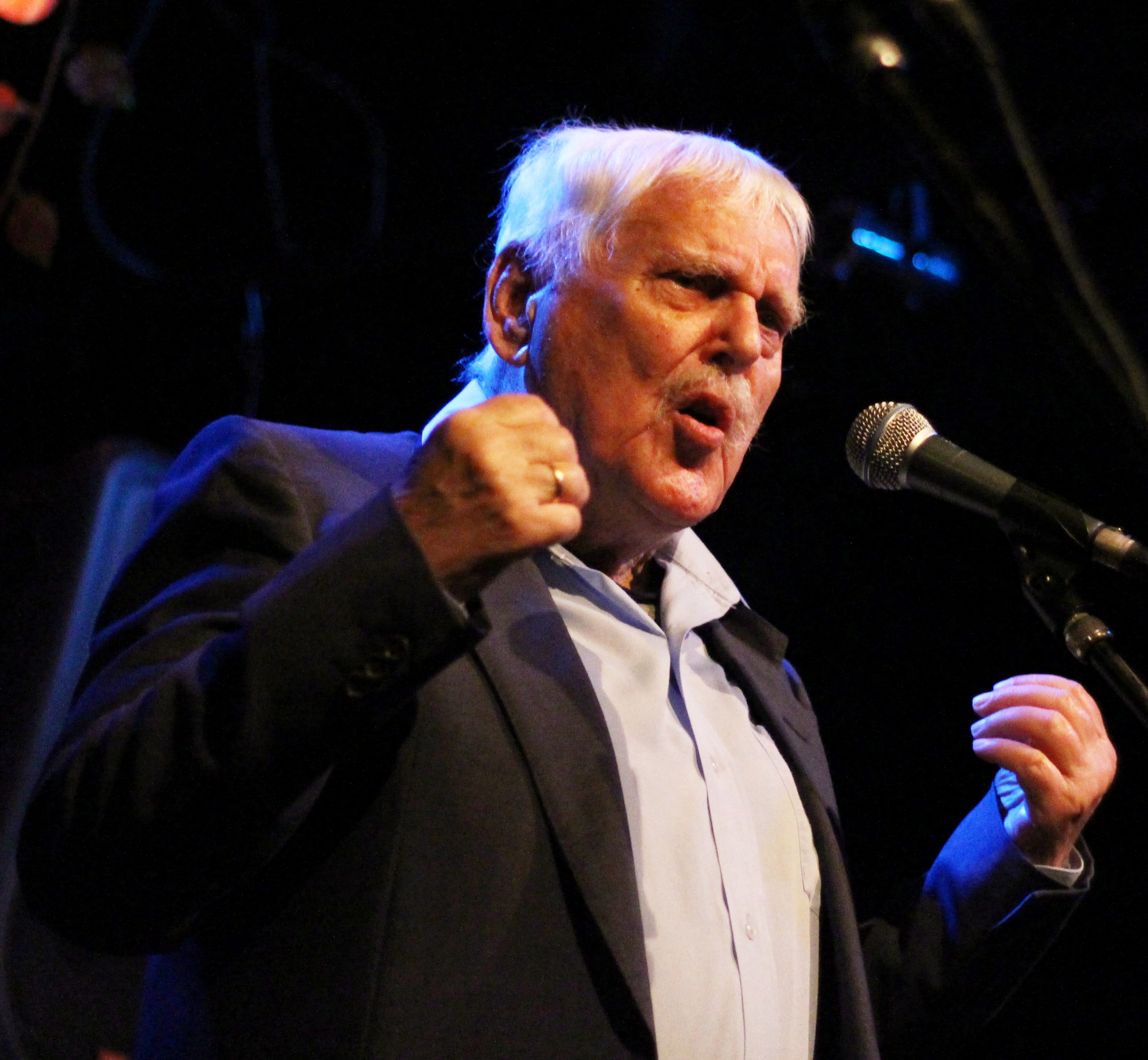
Jan Güntner at Piwnica pod Baranami (2014)

Source.

- Dziewczyna z dobrego domu (1962) as Filip, Joanna's colleague
- Niekochana (1965) as Piotr, friend of Kamil
- Serce (1965; short animated film)
- Trzecia granica (1975; TV series), episode 3
- Sprawa osobista (1984; TV film) as antiquarian Kropaczewski; film from the Zdaniem obrony film cycle
- Blisko, coraz bliżej (1986; TV series) as Doctor Bedweiser on a passenger train, episode 17
- Gry uliczne (1996) as a lawyer
- Kazimierz zamknięty (2004; short film) as an old man
- Ad maiorem pastae gloriam (2017; short film) as reverent Spaghettus

== Television theatre ==
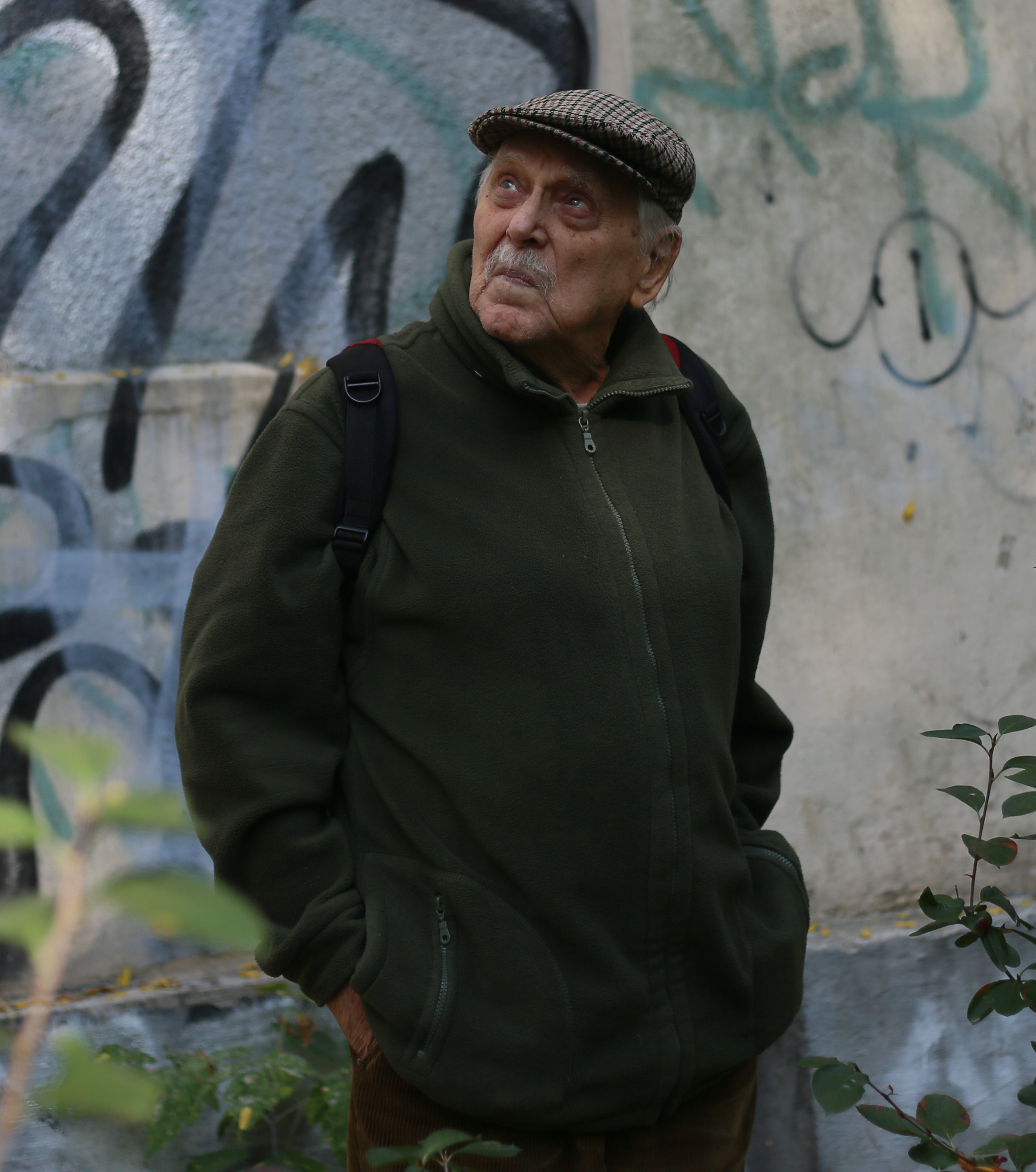
Jan Güntner at Park Krakowski, 2018

Source.

- Smok (1961) as Szarleman, archivist
- Pensjonat pod Aniołem Stróżem (1963)
- Dwa zmartwienia Obłomowa (1963)
- Rewizor (1964) as Bobczyński
- Gry i zabawy (1964) as Poboczny; also: assistant director
- Futro bobrowe (1970) as Motes
- Rh Inżynier (1978) as professor Pistjan
- Pastorałka (1979) as Prologus, Dameta, Pachoł 2
- Odprawa posłów greckich (1982)
- Żałoba przystoi Elektrze (1983) as doctor
- Polski listopad (1983) as count Ostrowski
- Poeta Laureatus (1983)
- Dziady (1983) as Pelikan
- Granica (1984) as count Toczewski
- Prawdziwe Lemuela Gulliwera Przygody (1987) jako Guliwer, Hulgo, Glum
- Pięćdziesiąt dukatów (1987) as Nowicki
- Ostatni z Jagiellonów czyli Rzeczpospolita na rozdrożu (1988) as Kyiev voivode
- Reformator (1989) as old man with an umbrella
- Bruno (1989) as Emisariusz
- Zapach orchidei (1991) as Gęsikowski
- Sprawa Andersa (1993)
- Wiosna narodów w cichym zakątku (1997) as senator
- Strach na strychu (1998) as director
