= Tomaschek =

Tomaschek, also Tomascheck is a Germanized version of the Czech and Slovak surname Tomášek, Croatian surname Tomašek, or Polish surname Tomaszek. Notable people with the surname include:

- Johann Wenzel Tomaschek or Václav Tomášek, Czech music educator and composer
- Karl Tomaschek (1828–1878), Austrian literary historian
- Róbert Tomaschek (born 1972), Slovak footballer
- Rudolf Tomaschek (1895–1966), a German experimental physicist
- Wilhelm Tomaschek (1841–1901), a Czech-Austrian geographer and orientalist
