= Slodowy =

Slodowy or Słodowy is a surname. Notable people with the surname include:

- Adam Słodowy (1923–2019), Polish inventor and writer
- Peter Slodowy (1948–2002), German mathematician
