= Tomek in the Land of Kangaroos =

1957 novel by Alfred Szklarski

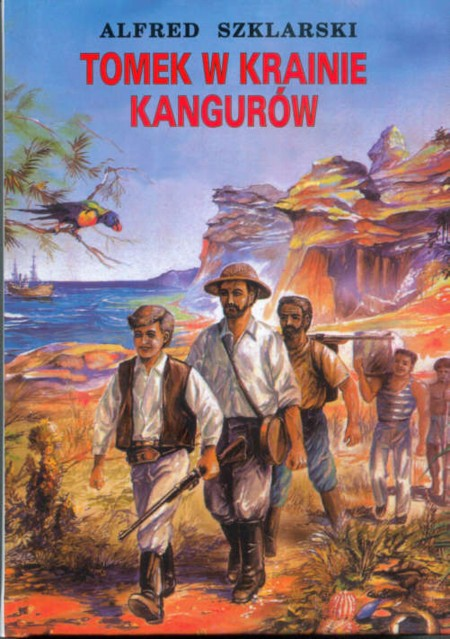
- Author: Alfred Szklarski
- Original title: Tomek w krainie kangurów
- Language: Polish
- Genre: Adventure novel
- Publisher: Wydawnictwo Naukowe "Śląsk"
- Publication date: 1957
- Publication place: Poland
- Followed by: Tomek on the Black Continent

Tomek in the Land of Kangaroos (Polish: Tomek w krainie kangurów) is a youth adventure novel by Alfred Szklarski, in 1957. It tells about the hunting expedition into Australia of Tomek Wilmowski and his father. It is the first book in the series.

== Plot ==
The story takes place in 1902. Tomek Wilmowski, a 14-year-old Polish boy, is a student of a Warsaw gymnasium. Tomek is an emigrant who has to flee from the country that is under Russian occupation. Friend of Andrzej Wimowski, Jan Smuga is an explorer and Andrzej Wilmowski's friend that comes to Warsaw. Tomek goes with him on an adventure to Australia. During his travels, Tomek hunts kangaroos, survives a sandstorm, and learns to cooperate with others.

== Characters ==
- Tomek Wilmowski – a 14-year-old Polish boy, son of Andrzej Wilmowski. Member of the hunting expedition to Australia.
- Andrzej Wilmowski – father of Tomek Wilmowski, organiser of the hunting expedition to Australia.
- Jan Smuga – experienced hunter and animal tracker.
- Bosman Nowicki – member of the expedition.
- Karol Bentley – zoologist, manager of a zoo in Melbourne.
- Hagenbeck – entrepreneur involved in supplying animals to Australian zoos.
- Tony – guide and animal tracker, Aboriginal Australian, friend of Tomek Wilmowski.
- Mac Dougal – Scottish captain of the "Aligator" ship.
- John Clark – former employee of transcontinental telegraph in Australia, owner of a farm where hunting was arranged.
- Watsung – a Chinese man housekeeping the farm of John Clark.
- Lorenc – worker on John Clark's farm.
- Albanowie family – farmers
- O'Donells – father and son, Irish gold prospectors.
- Tomson – partner of the O'Donells in gold prospecting.
- Carter – bushranger, terrorist
- Aboriginals from the kangaroo tribe
- Dingo – Tomek's dog
- Mielnikow – director of the gymnasium where Tomek studied
- Krascew – geography teacher, called Piła by students. Does every command of Mielnikov and russificator of the school.
- Jurek Tymowski – Tomek's classmate.
- Pawluk – Tomek's classmate, the best student, favoured by teachers
- Janina Karska – Tomek's aunt, his guardian after the death of Tomek's mother
- Antoni Karski – Tomek's uncle, Janina's husband, works as an accountant.
- Witek, Zbyszek and Irena Karska – Tomek's cousins, children of Janina and Antoni.
- Old Arab fortune teller from Port Said.
