= Ten obcy =

1961 novel by Irena Jurgielewiczowa

That Stranger
- First edition
- Author: Irena Jurgielewiczowa
- Original title: Ten obcy
- Language: Polish
- Publication date: 1961
- Publication place: Poland
- Followed by: Inna?

That Stranger (Polish: Ten obcy) is a novel by the Polish author Irena Jurgielewiczowa, published in 1961. It is required reading for Year 6 students in Poland. That Stranger has been translated into 23 languages.

The novel was placed on the Honour List at the 1964 Hans Christian Andersen Awards.

The main characters of this novel also appear in another of Irena Jurgielewiczowa's novels, Inna? (Another?) (1975).

== Plot summary ==
The book is about teen love problems and the challenges of growing up. The main characters are four friends: Ula, Pestka (Pip), Marian and Julek. The story takes place in Olszyna, a small village about 150 km from Warsaw. During the summer holiday, the teens spend a lot of time on an island created by spring floods. They create a hut and set poles in order to make access to the island easier. One day, a mysterious boy shows up on the island. The boy is injured, so the group of friends decide to take care of him. The boy says little at first, but eventually begins to reveal his secrets.

== Major characters ==
- Zenon Wójcik (called Zenek) is the main and title character of the book. After the death of his mother he lived alone in Wrocław with an alcoholic father. He had had enough of this life, so he decided to flee to his uncle. While trying to escape he hurt his leg with a piece of glass and stopped on an island near Olszyny. There he found the four friends. Zenek falls in love with Urszula Zalewska.
- Urszula Zalewska (called Ula) is a very quiet and a shy girl. She doesn't like to talk about her feelings. She was the first to notice that Zenek is wounded, and that the group of friends should help him. Ula lives with her aunts in Warsaw. Her father is a doctor. Like Zenek she has no mother.
- Juliusz Miler (called Julek) is a younger cousin of Marian. He is very energetic and dynamic. He does not like to play with girls, unless the 'Pip'. Julek loves the fact that Zenek saved the child and treats him as the greatest hero and his authority, although at first he wanted him as a first strike.
- Pestka Ubyszówna (called Pip) is energetic and likes to impress Zenek by doing things, such as swimming. Pip is the best friend of Ula, although sometimes both fight. Zenek admires her for her courage.
- Marian Pietrzyk is the oldest of the entire group. He is fully in the role of leader and guide. He is the older cousin of Julek. Zenek does not like the group, but Marian makes him stay. When the holidays come along, he decides to visit his grandparents in Olszyny with Julek.
- Danube (Dunaj) is an unknown dog, which likes Ula. At the beginning of the book he is wild, but then the children with the help of Zenek embrace the animal. When Victor later on in the book throws a stone at the Danube, the dog becomes wild again.
