= Adam Polewka =

Writer, translator, theatre director, politician (1903–1956)

- Born: 4 March 1903; Kraków
- Died: 1 October 1956 (aged 53); Kraków
- Occupations: Writer, translator, journalist, theatre director, politician

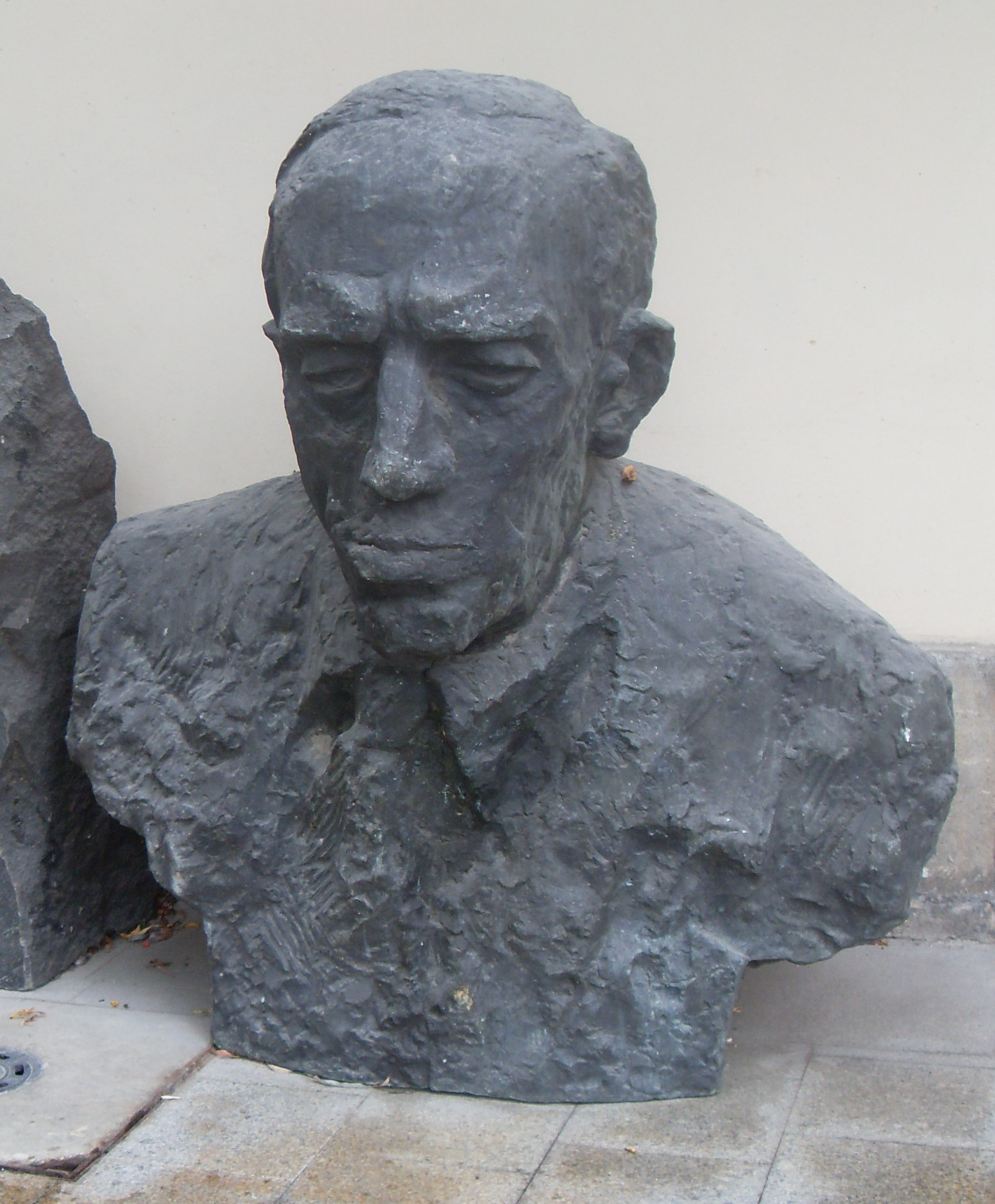
Bust of Adam Polewka by Wincenty Kućma

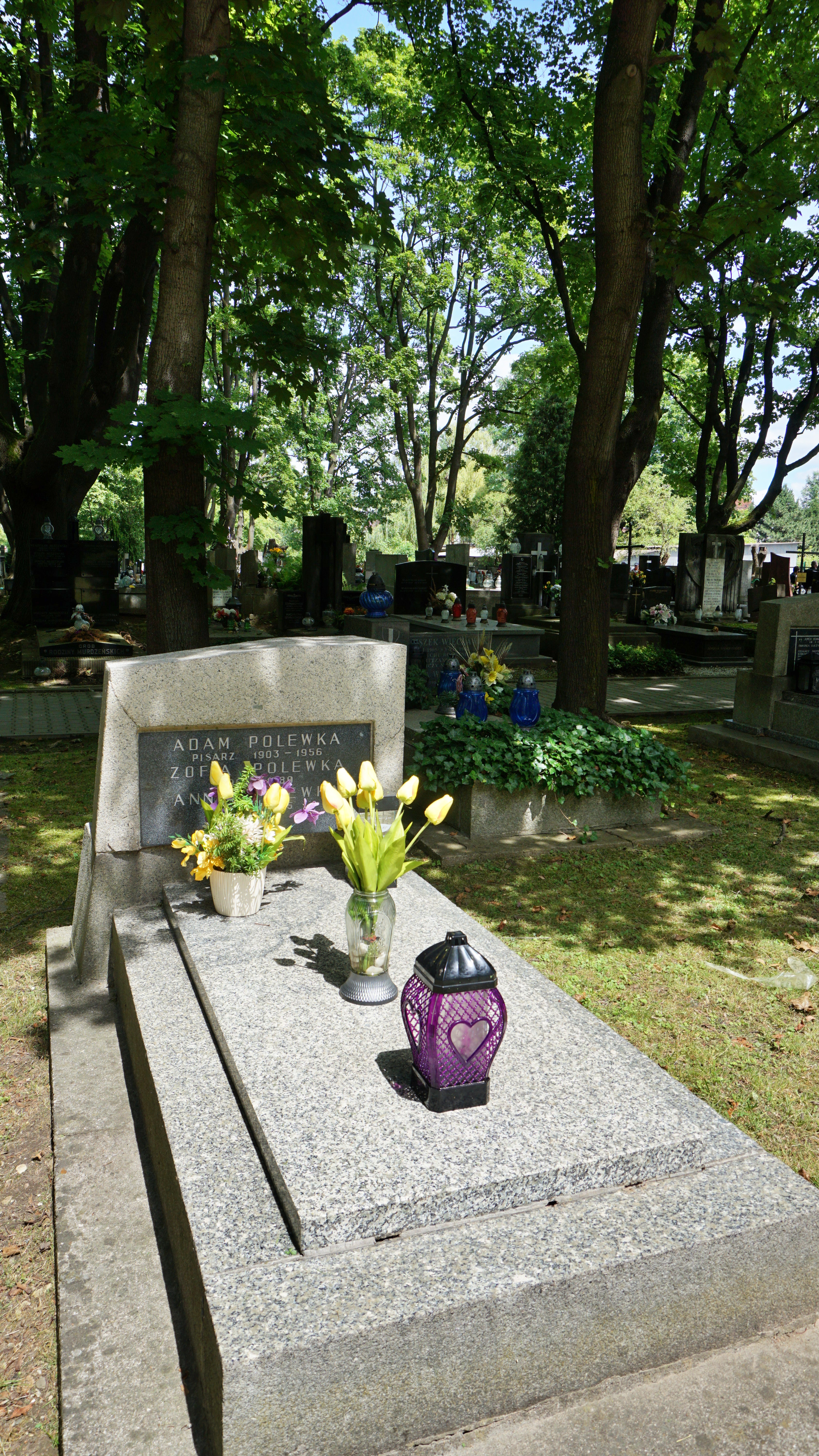
Grave of Adam Polewka at the Rakowicki Cemetery

Adam Antoni Polewka (4 March 1903 – 1 October 1956) was a writer, translator, journalist, theatre director and communist politician.

== Biography ==
Son of Antoni Polewka (1871–1929) and Anna née Wątrubek.

From 1929 to 1930 he directed a workers' theater in Sosnowiec. In 1932 he joined Communist Party of Poland. In 1935 he co-created experimental theatre Cricot in Kraków.

In 1945 he joined Polish Workers' Party, and in 1948 – Polish United Workers' Party. In 1946 he initiated Echo Krakowa; and in March 1946 he became its first editor-in-chief. From 1947 he was a member of Sejm. In the following years, he worked primarily as a contract lecturer in the fundamentals of Marxism–Leninism and other ideological subjects at higher art schools in Kraków. In 1946, he presented a series of daily, improvised radio talks — New Times, New People — that led to him receiving death threats from the anti-communist underground. From 1954 to 1955 he contributed to Szpilki. He was twice penalized with party reprimands, which were expunged in 1956. He taught at the PWST in Kraków, where his students included Jan Güntner.

He was married to Zofia Suchta; he had children: Maria Anna (1933–1955), a poet; Andrzej (born 1941), psychiatrist, and Jan (born 1945), visual artist and set designer.

He suffered from pulmonary tuberculosis. He was buried at the Rakowicki Cemetery, in the Avenue of the Meritorious.

In 1969 a monument of Adam Polewka, designed by Wincenty Kućma, was placed in Kraków, in the park named after Polewka. The monument was removed in the early 1990s, and the park was renamed to Vincent de Paul Park.

== Works ==
- Kocham i nienawidzę. Kraków: Wydawnictwo Literackie. 1955.

== Awards ==
- Knight's Cross of the Order of Polonia Restituta (1946)
- Medal of the 10th Anniversary of People's Poland (1955)
- Order of the Banner of Labour, 2nd class
- Order of the Banner of Labour, 1st class (posthumously)

== Bibliography ==
- Kydryński, Juliusz (1969). Próba portretu. Rzecz o Adamie Polewce. Kraków: Wydawnictwo Literackie.
