= Jacek i Agatka =

Polish television series

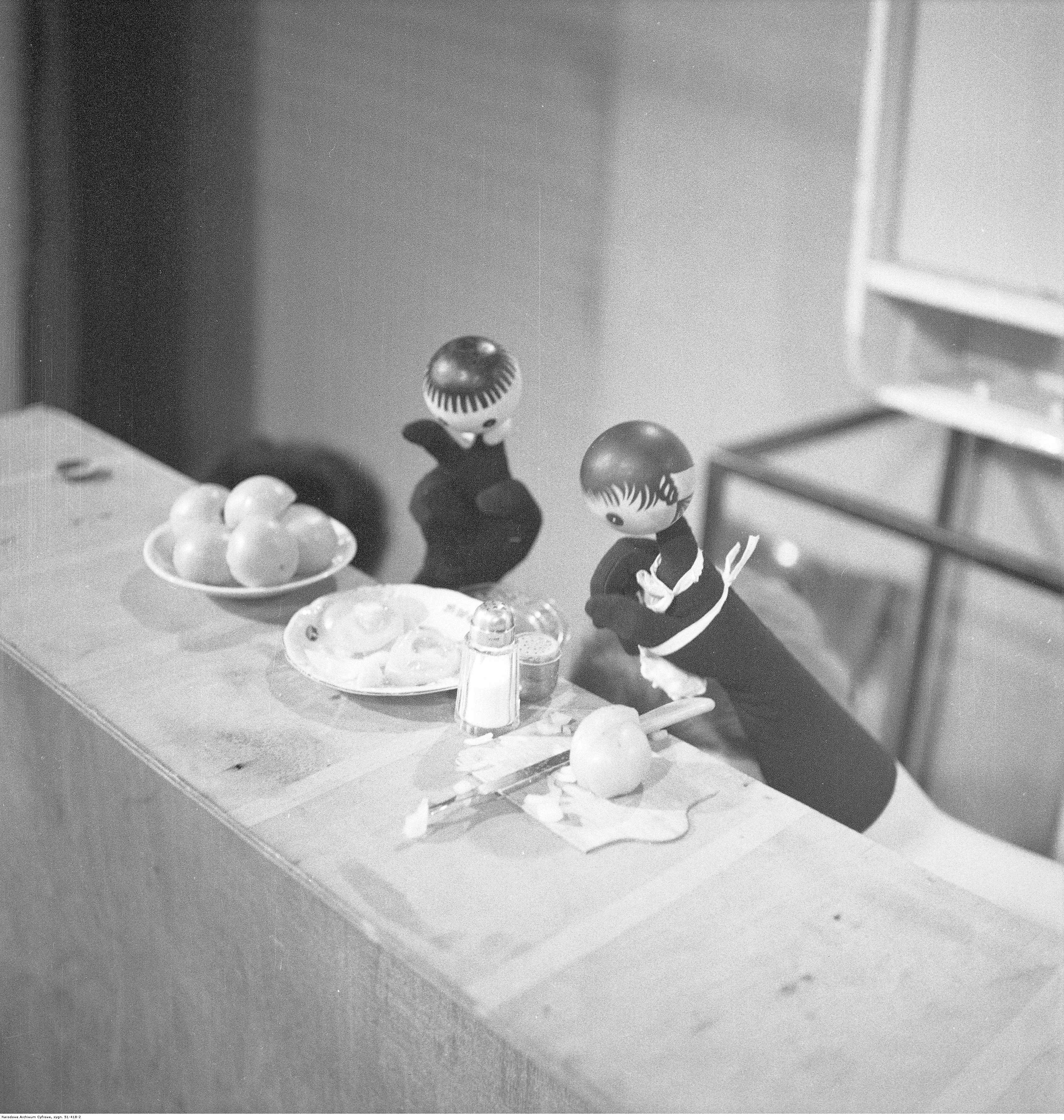
- Genre: Children's television, finger puppetry
- Written by: Wanda Chotomska
- Voices of: Zofia Raciborska
- Country of origin: Poland
- Original language: Polish

Original release
- Network: Telewizja Polska
- Release: 2 October 1962 – 1973

Jacek i Agatka (Jacek and Agatka) is a Polish television program created by writer Wanda Chotomska. It was created for the Telewizja Polska's children's television block Dobranocka. It was the first Polish television show intended for bedtime. Featuring finger puppetry, the show centers on the young siblings Jacek and Agatka who explore children's topics and curiously crafted ideas. The program aired at 19:20 CET three times a week between 2 October 1962 and 1973. It was merchandised with bathing products and toys.

Adam Kilian designed the puppet characters and Zofia Raciborska voiced them. Jacek was performed by Teresa Olenderczyk and Agatka was performed by Barbara Skokowska. Each character is made out of a painted wood ball of approximately 8 cm (3.1 in) diameter as a head on top of each performer's index finger on a black gloved hand. The heads have been mistaken by audiences to derive from ping-pong balls. Raciborska also plays Lady Zosia, a neighbouring woman who listens and responds to the siblings' subjects.

One episode has Jacek and Agatka introducing a competition for viewers to design the appearance of the new Order of the Smile award. The award was established by Kurier Polski and Chotomska after the publication interviewed her on the show's fifth anniversary. According to the award's website, she was told from a boy in a Konstancin-Jeziorna-based hospital about his dream to award Jacek a medal. Another account of the Konstancin visit according to the Muzeum Dobranocek website has a boy desiring an award given on behalf of children.

== Legacy ==
The name "Jacek i Agatka" has been used for the names of many kindergartens (przedszkole) of Poland. Both characters appear on cultural commemorative ducat coins featuring Rzeszów and the Muzeum Dobranocek issued in the Spring of 2011. The museum also possesses several objects related to the show including screenplays.
