= Wilfried Erdmann =

German sailor and author (1940–2023)

- Born: 15 April 1940; Scharnikau, Reichsgau Wartheland, Nazi Germany
- Died: 8 May 2023 (aged 83)
- Children: 1 son

Wilfried Erdmann (15 April 1940 – 8 May 2023) was a German sailor and author. He was known for his single-handed, non-stop circumnavigations.

== Biography ==
Erdmann was born on 15 April 1940 in Scharnikau in Reichsgau Wartheland during the German occupation of Poland during World War II, but grew up in Karstädt in East Germany. After finishing school he worked as a carpenter before relocating to West Germany at the age of 17. From 1958 to 1959, he traveled alone to India by bicycle via Southern France, North Africa, the Near East, and Afghanistan. It was in India that he first encountered the idea of sailing across the oceans. Because he couldn't afford a boat, he made his living for a couple of years as a seaman in the Merchant navy.

Erdmann embarked on his first circumnavigation in 1967. He bought his first boat, a used 25 ft wooden sloop in Alicante, Spain – where he met Bernard Moitessier who introduced him to the art of astronavigation – and renamed it Kathena, arriving back on the German island of Heligoland on 7 May 1968 after 421 days. He was the first German to sail single-handed around the world. Because of the size of his boat, nobody in Germany believed him at first despite Erdmann producing carefully maintained logbooks and documentary evidence of his ports of call.

His honeymoon with his wife Astrid was spent on a 1,011-day voyage from 1969 to 1972 which eventually became his second circumnavigation. Having sold Kathena, his first boat, they travelled aboard his second boat Kathena 2.

Further voyages included:

- 1976 to 1979: journey to the South Pacific with his wife and three-year-old son Kym.
- 1984 to 1985: non-stop, solo circumnavigation from west to east with the prevailing winds on Kathena Nui in 271 days.
- 1989: two Atlantic crossings with winners of a contest run by German magazine Stern.
- 2000 to 2001: non-stop, solo circumnavigation from east to west (against the prevailing winds) on Kathena Nui in 343 days. He was the fifth sailor in the world to achieve this.

Erdmann died on 8 May 2023, at the age of 83.

== Sources ==
1. CV on his homepage (German)
2. "Article about his circumnavigation (German)". spiegel.de. Archived from the original on July 22, 2011.
