= Czarnków =

Town in Greater Poland Voivodeship, Poland

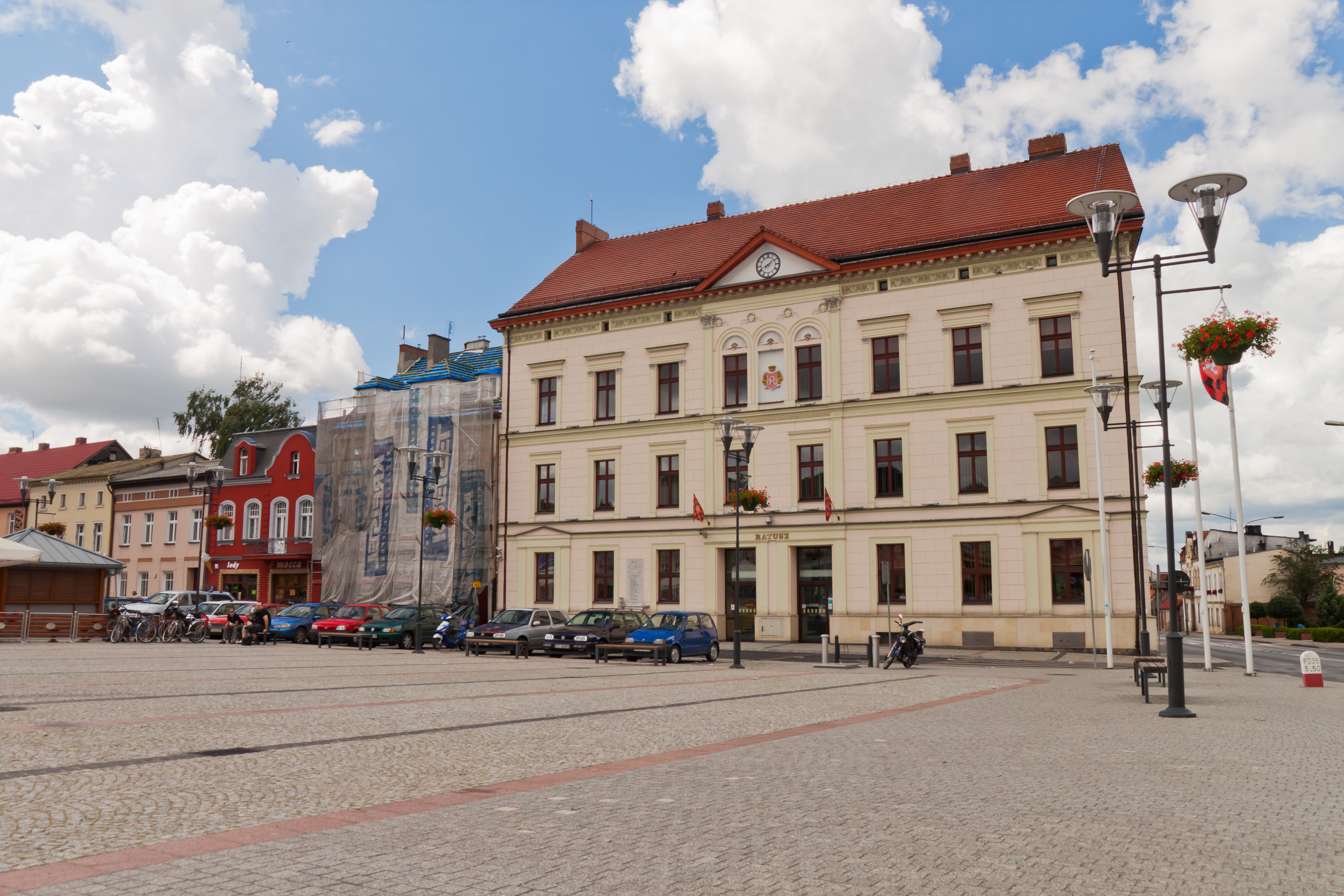
- Town Hall

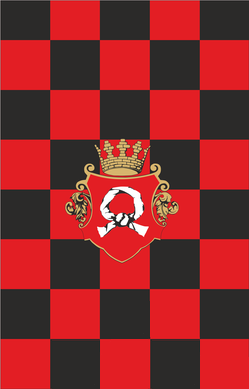
- Flag Coat of arms

- Location within Poland
- Coordinates: 52°54′N 16°34′E
- Country: Poland
- Voivodeship: Greater Poland
- County: Czarnków-Trzcianka
- Gmina: Czarnków (urban gmina)
- Established: 10th century
- First mentioned: 12th century
- Town rights: Before 1369

Government
  - Mayor: Andrzej Tadla

Area
  - Total: 9.7 km^{2} (3.7 sq mi)

Population (31 December 2021)
  - Total: 10,279
  - Density: 1,100/km^{2} (2,700/sq mi)
- Time zone: UTC+1 (CET)
  - Summer (DST): UTC+2 (CEST)
- Postal code: 64-700
- Area code: +48 67
- Vehicle registration: PCT
- Website: http://www.czarnkow.pl

Czarnków [ˈt͡ʂarŋkuf] is a town in Poland in Czarnków-Trzcianka County in Greater Poland Voivodeship. As of December 2021, the town has 10,279 inhabitants.

The town lies on the Noteć river. Because there are many hills around the town, the area is called Szwajcaria Czarnkowska ("Czarnków's Switzerland").

== History ==
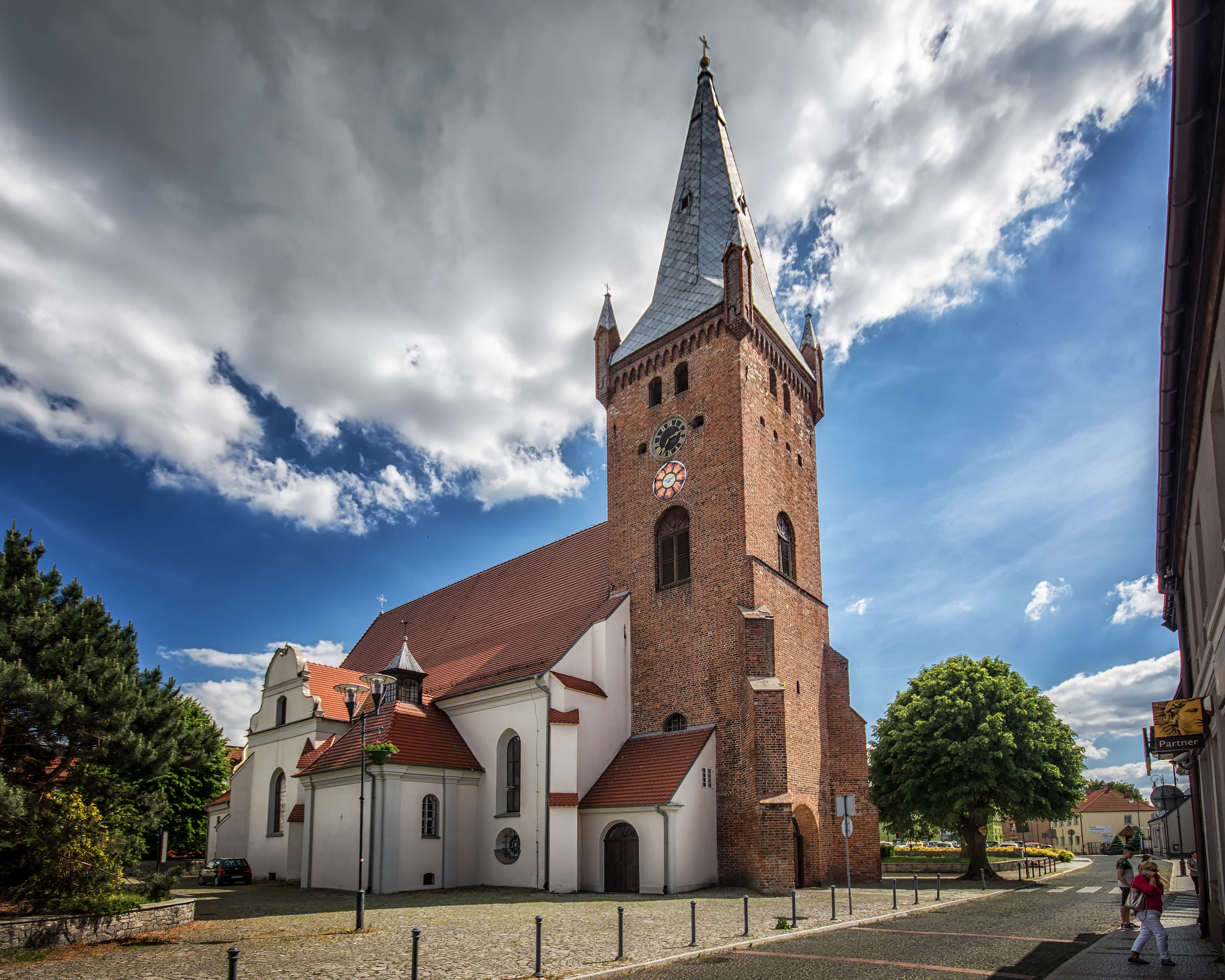
Saint Mary Magdalene church

The area was included within the emerging Polish state in the 10th century by its first historic ruler Mieszko I of Poland. An early Polish stronghold and settlement were founded in the 10th century. In the early 12th century, it was a stronghold of pagan Pomeranians, ruled by local Pomeranian ruler Gniewomir. It was reconquered by Polish Duke Bolesław III Wrymouth in 1108, and shortly after it was noted for the first time in the early 12th century Gesta principum Polonorum by Gallus Anonymus, the oldest Polish chronicle. Czarnków developed at the intersection of trade routes connecting Poznań with Pomerania and Wieleń with Nakło nad Notecią. During the fragmentation of Piast-ruled Poland it formed part of the Duchy of Greater Poland, and afterwards, it was made a private town, administratively located in the Poznań County in the Poznań Voivodeship in the Greater Poland Province of the Kingdom of Poland. From 1244 until 1407 Czarnków was the seat of a castellany.

In the late 13th century Polish monarch Władysław I Łokietek granted Czarnków to the Polish noble family of Nałęcz, which then changed its name to Czarnkowski after the town. The Czarnkowski family built a new castle (first time noted in 1331 and destroyed at the end of the 17th century) and established town privileges before 1369. Czarnków remained a private town of the Czarnkowski family until the mid-17th century, and the family's Nałęcz coat of arms remains the town's coat of arms to this day. In the 16th (or 15th) century the family erected the Gothic Saint Mary Magdalene church, which became its official burial site, and it is the most distinctive historic landmark of the town. Afterwards, the town was owned by the Polish families of Grzymułtowski, Gembicki, Naramowski, Poniatowski, Świniarski. In the 17th century Protestant refugees from Silesia settled in the town and helped develop its cloth industry.

The town was annexed by the Kingdom of Prussia in the First Partition of Poland in 1772. Following the successful Greater Poland uprising of 1806, it was regained by Poles and included within the short-lived Duchy of Warsaw, in 1815 it was re-annexed by Prussia, and was the centre of Kreis Czarnikau; from 1871 to 1919 it also formed part of the German Empire. Poland regained independence after World War I in 1918, and during the Greater Poland uprising (1918–19) the town was recaptured by Polish insurgents. 21 Polish insurgents died in battle in Czarnków. Afterwards it was divided by the new German-Polish border. The western part of the town remained within Weimar Germany and was renamed Deutsch Czarnikau in 1920 and Scharnikau in 1937, while Polish Czarnków became a county seat within the Poznań Voivodeship.

During the German occupation (World War II), in November 1939, the Germans murdered many inhabitants of Czarnków during large massacres of Poles carried out in Mędzisko as part of the Intelligenzaktion. Six local Polish police officers, a local school teacher, a local tax inspector, and six graduates from the local teachers' college were murdered by the Russians in the Katyn massacre in 1940. In August 1944, the Germans carried out mass arrests of local members of the Home Army, the leading Polish underground resistance organization. Czarnków was eventually liberated in January 1945, and then restored to Poland, although with a Soviet-installed communist regime, which stayed in power until the Fall of Communism in the 1980s. Edmund Maron, commander of the local Home Army unit, who was not arrested by the Germans, was arrested by the communists in August 1945, and then imprisoned.

From 1975 to 1998, the town was administratively located in the Piła Voivodeship. In August 1980, employees of local factories joined the nationwide anti-communist strikes, which led to the foundation of the Solidarity organization, which played a central role at the end of communist rule in Poland.

== Historic architecture and tourist sights ==
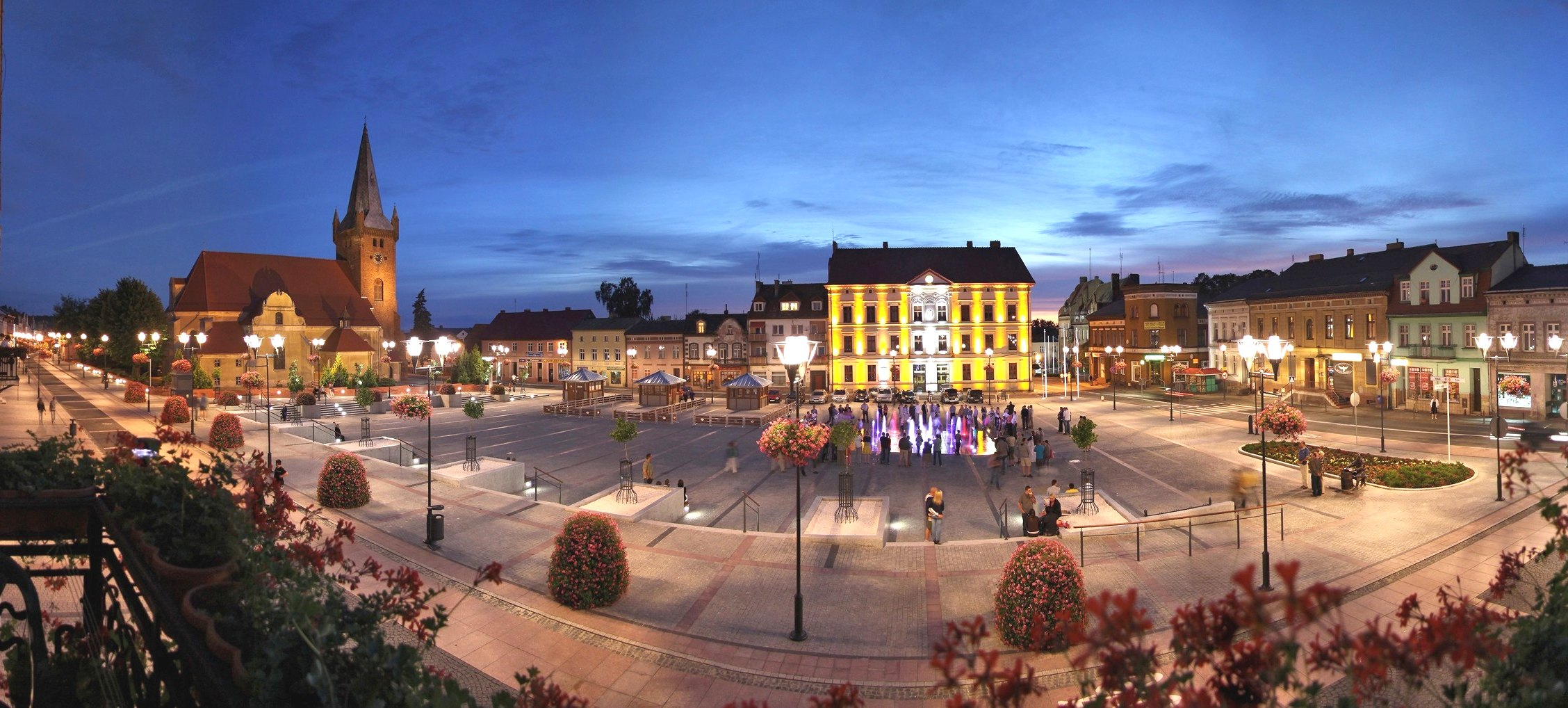
Evening view of the Plac Wolności with the Saint Mary Magdalene church on the left and the illuminated town hall in the middle

- Gothic church of Saint Mary Magdalene with rich Renaissance and Baroque interior
- Plac Wolności (Liberty Square), the town's main square filled with historic townhouses
- 19th-century Eclectic town hall
- Muzeum Ziemi Czarnkowskiej, local historic, archaeological and ethnographic museum
- Neoclassical Świniarski Manor
- County Office
- old brewery
- 18-19th-century houses
- Park Miejski im. Stanisława Staszica (Stanisław Staszic City Park) with the only ski jump in the Polish Lowlands
- Marina on the Noteć river
- remnants of a 19th-century Jewish cemetery

== Culture ==
Czarnków is a brewing center with traditions dating back to the 16th century. The local Noteckie beer is an officially protected traditional beverage, as designated by the Ministry of Agriculture and Rural Development of Poland.

== Notable people ==
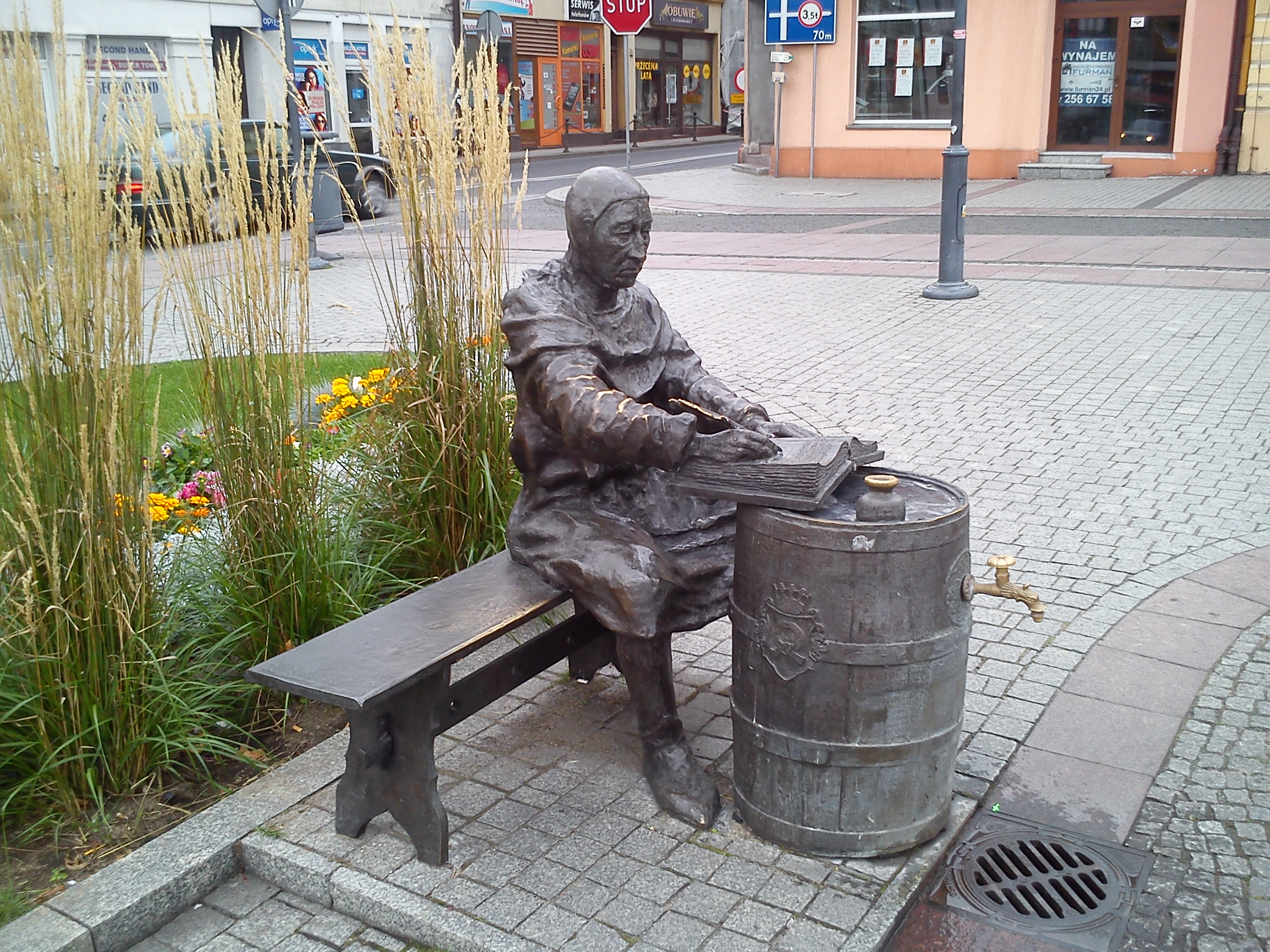
Jan of Czarnków monument

- Wilfried Erdmann (1940–2023), sailor
- Jan of Czarnków, Polish 14th-century chronicler and Deputy Chancellor of the Crown
- Ada von Maltzahn (Ada von Gersdorff) (1854–1922), German novelist
- Wincenty Niałek, 13th-century archbishop of Gniezno
- Milena Olszewska (born 1984), Polish archer
- Frieda Riess (1890–c. 1955), photographer
- Reinhold Sadler (1848–1906), former governor of Nevada
- Wacław Taranczewski (1903–1987), Polish painter and professor of the Jan Matejko Academy of Fine Arts in Kraków
- Adam Słodowy (1923–2019), Polish author and TV host

== International relations ==
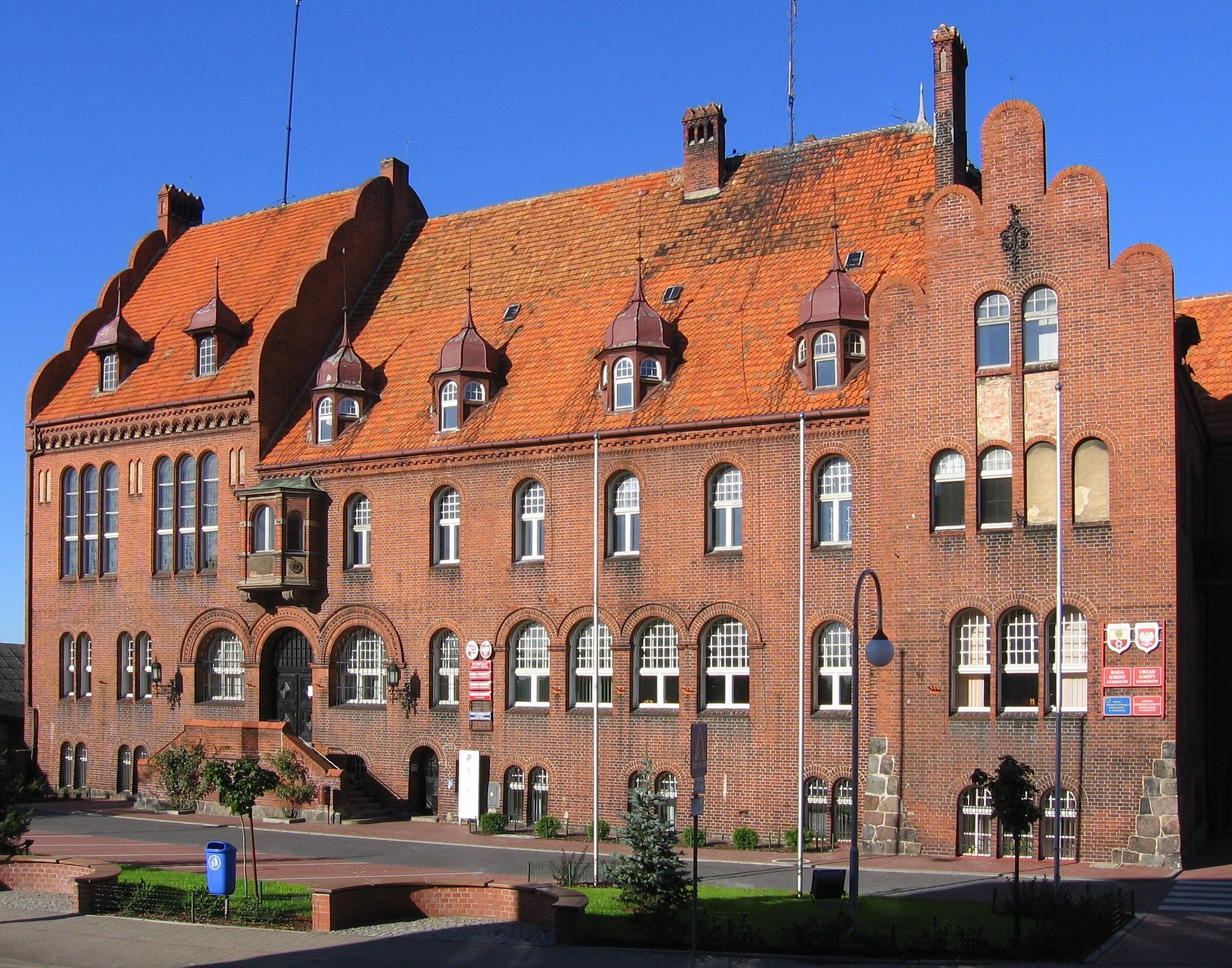
District municipal offices in Czarnków

=== Twin towns — Sister cities ===
Czarnków is twinned with:

- Coevorden in Netherlands
- Gadebusch in Germany
