= Alfred Szklarski =

Polish children's author

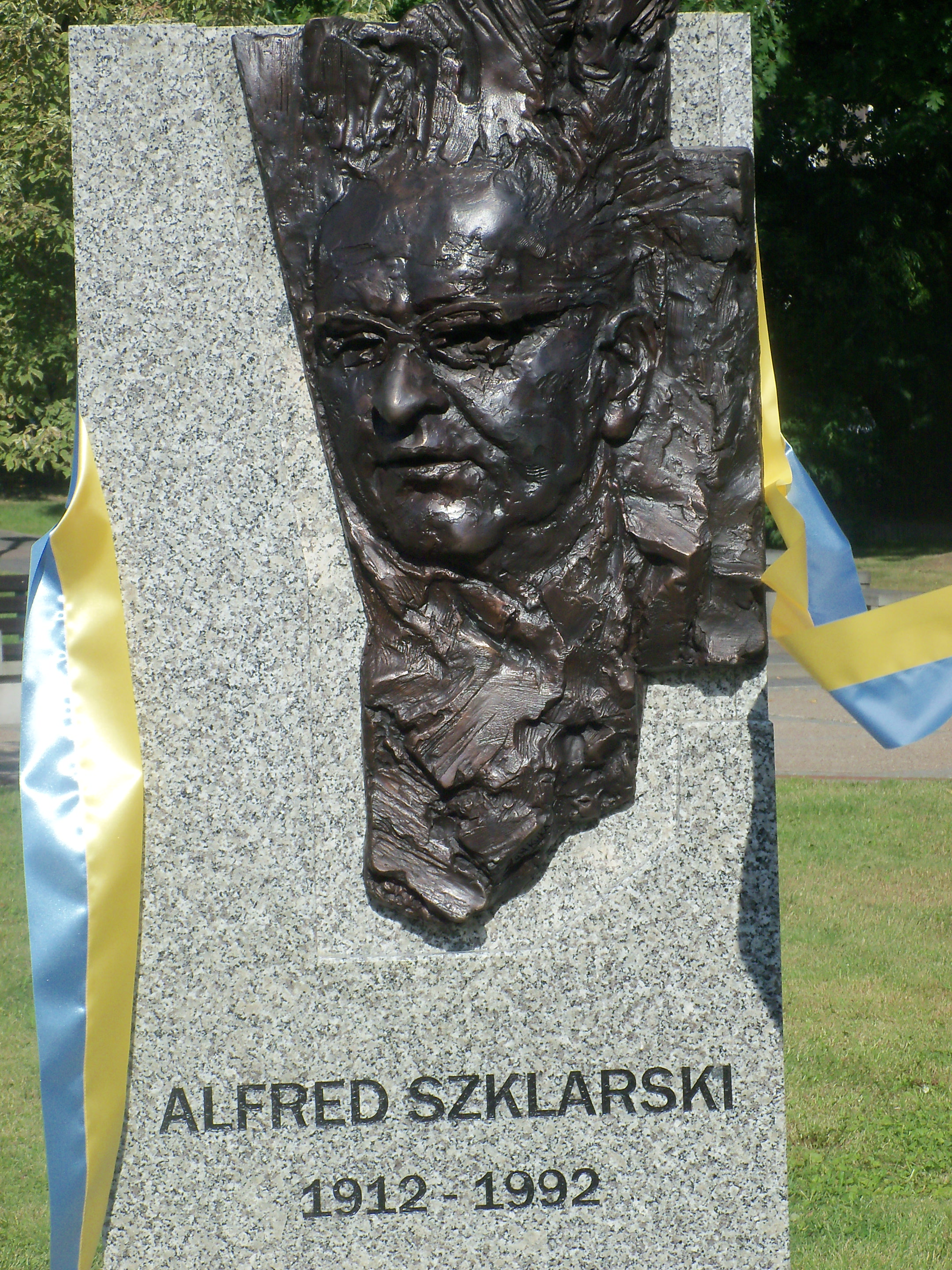
- Commemorative statue of Alfred Szklarski in Grunwald Square in Katowice
- Born: 21 January 1912; Chicago, Illinois, U.S.
- Died: 9 April 1992 (aged 80); Katowice, Poland
- Writing career
- Pen name: Alfred Bronowski; Fred Garland; Alfred Murawski
- Notable work: series of novels about Tomek Wilmowski

Alfred Szklarski (Polish pronunciation: [ˈalfrɛt ˈʂklarskʲi]; 21 January 1912 – 9 April 1992) was a Polish author of youth literature. He also published his books under the pseudonyms Alfred Bronowski, Fred Garland and Alfred Murawski.

== Biography ==
Szklarski was born in Chicago, Illinois, United States, as the son of an émigré and journalist, Andrzej Szklarski, and Maria née Markosik. He started school in Chicago but he moved to Poland with his father in 1926. At first he lived in Włocławek where he continued his education. Then in 1932 he moved to Warsaw where he studied at the Academy of Political Sciences until 1938. The graduation paved the way for his diplomatic career but his plans were interrupted by the outbreak of World War II. Szklarski stayed in the Polish capital during the German occupation. He joined the Armia Krajowa resistance and took part in the Warsaw Uprising as a volunteer rifleman. After the uprising's fall, he moved to Kraków but in February 1945 he went to live in Katowice in Upper Silesia where he remained until his death.

In the year 1949 he was tried by the communists for his publications in a daily New Courier of Warsaw as well as other German propaganda newspapers, which led in 1949 to him being accused of collaborating with the Germans. He was sentenced to eight years in prison but he was released in 1953 after serving 4 years.

== Career ==
Alfred Szklarski debuted during the German occupation of Poland with novels which were aimed at adults. These included: Żelazny pazur (Iron claw, 1942), Krwawe diamenty (Bloody diamonds, 1943) and Tajemnica grobowca (The secret of the tomb, 1944). They were published in the New Courier of Warsaw.

In the post-war period he started to sign his writings with pseudonyms: Alfred Bronowski and Fred Garland. However, his publishing house persuaded him to write youth novels signed with his real name. That was how his best known books came into existence, namely the series of novels about Tomek Wilmowski, a young boy who travels the world with his friends (Polish emigrants) and experiences great adventures. Tomek, who is the main character of the books, learns the value of friendship, study, responsibility, etc. The series of 9 books is full of geographical, historical, cultural and biological knowledge as well as humour and entertainment which is aimed at adolescents and young adults.

Szklarski co-authored, with his wife Krystyna Szklarska, a trilogy about the Sioux titled Złoto Gór Czarnych (The Gold of the Black Hills). The books described hunting bisons, the beliefs, intertribal conflicts and the later Native Americans' first contact with the white people as well as their fights. It is claimed that Szklarski's books about history and sufferings of the indigenous peoples of America were inspired by his own war experience as well as Polish people's tragic history and invaders' cruelty. He is considered to have believed that the history of Native Americans is similar to a great extent to the history of Poland. The only difference was that Poles have managed to finally endure invasions, long years of occupation, extermination, Germanisation and Russification, whereas tribes of America eventually lost their free homeland which was taken over by the Whites. He strongly condemned interracial violence, and supported the idea of reconciliation between nations.

The popularity of his books brought him several awards, including Orle Pióro (1968) and Order of the Smile in 1971. He was given awards by two Polish Prime Ministers (1973, 1987) for his literary works for young readers. He was a member of the Association of Polish Authors.

His books have been translated into Russian and Bulgarian. They have been published in Braille. As of 2017, 11 million copies had been printed.

== Works ==
=== Adventures of Tomek Wilmowski ===
1. Tomek w krainie kangurów (Tomek in the Land of Kangaroos, 1957)
2. Tomek na Czarnym Lądzie (Tomek on the Black Continent, 1958)
3. Tomek na wojennej ścieżce (Tomek on war path, 1959)
4. Tomek na tropach Yeti (Tomek traces Yeti, 1961)
5. Tajemnicza wyprawa Tomka (Tomek's secret expedition, 1963)
6. Tomek wśród łowców głów (Tomek among headhunters, 1965)
7. Tomek u źródeł Amazonki (Tomek at the source of Amazon, 1967)
8. Tomek w Gran Chaco (Tomek in Gran Chaco, 1987)
9. Tomek w grobowcach faraonów (Tomek in pharaohs' tombs, 1994, published posthumously by friend Adam Zelga who had finished the book on the basis of notes left by Szklarski)

=== The gold of the Black Hills (with Krystyna Szklarska) ===
1. Złoto Gór Czarnych – Orle Pióra (The gold of the Black Hills: Eagle Feathers, 1974)
2. Złoto Gór Czarnych – Przekleństwo złota (The gold of the Black Hills: The curse of gold, 1977)
3. Złoto Gór Czarnych – Ostatnia walka Dakotów (The gold of the Black Hills: The last battle of the Sioux, 1979)

=== Other works ===
- Gorący ślad. Współczesna powieść sensacyjna (Hot Trace. A modern sensational novel., 1946, alias: Alfred Bronowski)
- Trzy Siostry. Powieść. (Three Sisters. A novel., 1946, alias: Alfred Bronowski)
- Błędne ognie. Opowieść współczesna z życia górników (1947, alias: Alfred Bronowski)
- Nie czekaj na mnie. Powieść współczesna (Don't wait for me. Contemporary novel., 1947, alias: A. Bronowski)
1. Tomek w tarapatach (Tomek in trouble, 1948, alias: Fred Garland)
- Sobowtór profesora Rawy (1963, a science fiction novel)
