= Ada von Maltzahn =

German novelist (1854–1922)

- Born: Ada von Knobloch; May 14, 1854; Czarnkow, Posen, Prussia
- Died: 10 May 1922 (aged 67); Swinoujscie, Prussia, Germany
- Other names: Ada von Gersdorff
- Children: 1 son

Baroness Ada von Maltzahn (May 14, 1854 – May 10, 1922) was a popular nineteenth century German novelist who primarily published as Ada von Gersdorff.

== Biography ==
She was born Ada von Knobloch in 1854, the daughter of a local district administrator in modern-day Poland, but was then the province of Posen in West Prussia.

She married Prussian Army captain Gero von Gersdorff, but the marriage dissolved quickly, they divorced, and she returned to her parents' house in East Prussia with their son. In 1878, her father acquired an entailed estate in Sudnicken; he later became the Baron von Hausen-Aubier, but was more well-known as von Knobloch.

She spent the next part of her life traveling widely in Germany and internationally. While in Berlin, she took part in the court festivities of the last days of Kaiser Wilhelm I. She then moved to a smaller estate of her father's at Krumteich near Trömpau in East Prussia.

She married Baron Ludolf Hellmuth von Maltzahn in Berlin on May 19, 1894. Her second husband died in 1904. She continued to live in Berlin for many years.

== Career ==
Von Maltzahn was most famous for writing novels, novellas, and humor stories. Many of them included elements of romance as well. Her novels were popular enough to be acquired by many American libraries in the early twentieth century.

In 1912 to 1913, she wrote the script for the German silent film Gerda Gerovius, produced by Berlin company Messter Film. She had published the eponymous novel in 1910. The film, which starred Elsa Bassermann and was directed by Hans Oberländer, was restricted to adult viewing by police decree in Berlin and Munich, per local censorship laws.

== Books ==
Note: “Roman,” which often forms part of the title or serves as a subtitle, means “novel” in German.

- Die Herrin von Schönwerth. Goldschmidt, Berlin 1889.
- Unser gnädiger Herr! Roman. Goldschmidt, Berlin 1890.
- Verscherzt! Eine Studie. Goldschmidt, Berlin 1890.
- Lieutenants-Liebe. Zwei Humoresken. Goldschmidt, Berlin 1892.
- Ein Experiment. Roman. Goldschmidt, Berlin 1893.
- Das höchste Gut. Roman. Leipzig 1893.
- Verlorene Liebe. Roman. Goldschmidt, Berlin 1893.
- Ein schlechter Mensch. Roman. Engelhorn, Stuttgart 1894. (Digal Version)
- Erreichte Wünsche. Roman. 2 Parts. Janke, Berlin 1895.
- Tausend Thaler. Roman. Deutsche Verlags-Anstalt, Stuttgart 1895.
- Am Arbeitsmarkt. Roman. 2 Parts. Reissner, Dresden/Leipzig 1896.
- Schwere Frage. Roman. Engelhardt, Stuttgart 1896.
- Hochgeboren! Roman. 3 Volumes. Janke, Berlin 1897.
- Idealismus oder Thorheit?. Roman. Janke, Berlin 1897.
- Auf gefahrvollen Pfaden Roman. 3 Volumes. Janke, Berlin 1898.
- Maria Sabina Lindentrost. Erzählung. Goldschmidt, Berlin 1898.
- Sünderin. Roman. Janke, Berlin 1898.
- Des Vaters Schuld. Roman. 2 Volumes. Janke, Berlin 1898.
- Verkäuflicher Wert. Roman. 3 Volumes. Janke, Berlin 1898.
- Von Todes Gnaden. Roman. Deutsche Verlags-Anstalt, Stuttgart [u. a.] 1898.
- Aus Langeweile. Roman. Janke, Berlin 1899.
- Fluch des Talentes. Roman. 3 Volumes. Janke, Berlin 1899.
- Für ihre Ehre. Erzählung. Janke, Berlin 1899.
- Ludovika. 2 Volumes. Dresden 1899.
- "Nein". Eine Kreidezeichnung. Janke, Berlin 1899.
- Eine "sonderbare" Person! Repräsentantin der Hausfrau. Goldschmidt, Berlin 1899.
- Blumen im Schutt. Roman. 2 Volumes. Janke, Berlin 1900.
- Erlösende Worte. Roman. 2 Volumes. Janke, Berlin 1900.
- Der Noth gehorchend. Roman. Taendler, Berlin 1900.
- Um jeden Preis. Psychologie einer Schuld. Roman. Grunert, Berlin 1900.
- Gerettet. Novelle. Janke, Berlin 1901.
- Irdische Vorsehung. Roman. 2 Volumes. Janke, Berlin 1901.
- Räthselhafte Schuld. 2 Volumes. Dresden/Leipzig 1901.
- Bahn frei! Roman. 2 Volumes. Reissner, Dresden/Leipzig 1902.
- Durch Kampf zur Krone. Vobach, Berlin 1902.
- Gegen seinen Willen. Roman. Reissner, Dresden 1902.
- Stolze Herzen. Berlin 1903.
- Ein Wille – ein Weg. Union, Stuttgart [u. a.] 1903.
- Hass. Reissner, Dresden 1904.
- Anvertrautes Gut. Roman. Reissner, Dresden 1906.
- Ein Fürstentraum. Dresden 1908.
- Anna-Monikas Launen. Roman. Reissner, Dresden 1909.
- Betrogen und beglückt. Erzählung. Hillger, Berlin [u. a.] 1909.
- Pia. Roman. Vobach, Berlin [u. a.] 1909.
- Besiegt! Roman. Reissner, Dresden 1910.
- Das Bild zu Saïs. Roman. Verein der Bücherfreunde, Berlin 1910.
- Gerda Gerovius. Roman. Reissner, Dresden 1910.
- Königin-Mutter. Hillger, Berlin [u. a.] 1910.
- Das Paradies der Erde. Roman. Engelhorn, Stuttgart 1910.
- Eva, meine Frau. Reissner, Dresden 1912.
- "Eure Hoheit!" Erzählung. Hillger, Berlin [u. a.] 1913.
- Stammbaum und Lebensbaum. Roman. Gerstenberg, Leipzig 1913.
- Am Kreuzwege. Roman. Gerstenberg, Leipzig 1914.
- Aus den Papieren eines Hochstaplers. Gerstenberg, Leipzig 1914.
- Die Belastungsprobe. Gräfin Hochmut. Zwei Erzählungen. Hillger, Berlin [u. a.] 1914.
- Glück und Segen. Roman. Engelhorn, Stuttgart 1914.
- Ein Feigling. Roman aus dem Kriegsjahr 1914. Verein der Bücherfreunde, Berlin 1915. (Digital version)
- Der Krieg als Erzieher. Zeitgemäßer Roman. Gerstenberg, Leipzig 1915.
- Am Gestade der Vergessenheit. Die Geschichte einer Scheinehe. Verein der Bücherfreunde, Berlin 1916.
- Lebensfesseln. Roman. Hillger, Berlin [u. a.] 1916.
- Die Macht der Liebe. Roman. Gerstenberg, Leipzig 1916.
- Die Tochter des Regiments. Roman. Verein der Bücherfreunde, Berlin 1916.
- U 21. Roman. Gerstenberg, Leipzig 1916.
- Rittergut Goldgrube. Roman. Reissner, Dresden 1917.
- Bettelbrot. Roman Gerstenberg, Leipzig 1918.
- Ich muß siegen! Aus dem Leben eines Nervenarztes. Gerstenberg, Leipzig 1919.
- Freiherrenhaus und Warenhaus. Roman. Reissner, Dresden 1920.
- Kleine Königin. Revolutionsschicksale eines Königshauses. Roman. Gerstenberg, Leipzig 1920.
- Das Geheimnis von Totenmoor. Roman. Gerstenberg, Leipzig 1921.
