= Irena Jurgielewiczowa =

Polish children's author

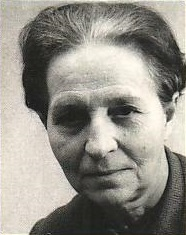
- Jurgielewiczowa in 1988
- Born: Irena Jurgielewiczowa; 13 January 1903; Działoszyn, partitioned Poland
- Died: 25 May 2003 (aged 100); Poland
- Occupations: Writer, teacher
- Writing career
- Genres: children's literature, young adult literature
- Notable works: Ten obcy (That Stranger, 1961)

Irena Jurgielewiczowa (née Drozdowicz; 13 January 1903 – 25 May 2003) was a Polish teacher and writer of children's literature and young adult literature. During World War II she was an underground teacher, member of Armia Krajowa, and participant of the Warsaw Uprising. After the war she was a lecturer at the University of Warsaw.

She is best known for Ten obcy (That Stranger, 1961) and Inna.

== Biography ==
Irena Jurgielewiczowa was born on 13 January 1903 in Działoszyn, Poland. She studied Polish philology at the Warsaw University, obtaining a doctoral degree in 1928, and pedagogy at the Wolna Wszechnica Polska (Free Polish University). She worked as a teacher in Warsaw beginning in 1928. She spend 1932 through 1934 in France. After her return she was a lecturer at Wolna Wszechnica Polska. During World War II in occupied Poland she was a teacher in the underground education. She joined the Armia Krajowa resistance, took part in the Warsaw Uprising, and from 1944 until the end of the war she was a prisoner of war in Germany. During the war she wrote her first book for children, Historia o czterech pstroczkach.

After the war, Jurgielewiczowa settled in Warsaw. She lectured at the pedagogy department of the Warsaw University (1947–1950) and she was a literature director of the National Theatre of New Warsaw (Państwowy Teatr Nowej Warszawy). From 1954 she became a full-time writer. Her books were translated to numerous languages including Bulgarian, Czech, German, Italian, Japanese, Russian and Ukrainian.

Jurgielewiczowa was married to the painter Mieczysław Jurgielewicz. She died on 25 May 2003, aged 100 years.

== Recognition ==
Her work has been described as combining a knowledge of problems and mentality of her young readers with an interest in their ethical and intellectual transformation. Her readers have praised her for being "smart but not overbearing, patriotic but not nationalistic".

She wrote a number of children's literature and young adult literature as well as some mémoires. In 1958 she received the Award of the President of the Council of Minister for her work. A year later she received the Award of the City of Warsaw. She is best known for Ten obcy (That Stranger, 1961), for which she has received the International Board on Books for Young People diploma of honor in 1964. The book sequel, Inna? (Other?, 1975) was listed in the Premio Europeo. Her autobiography Byłam, byliśmy (I was, we were, 1998) was a finalist for the Nike Award. She is also a recipient of the Order of the Smile.

== List of works ==
Selected works of her include:

- 1948: Historia o czterech pstroczkach
- 1948: Warszawa-serce Polski
- 1949: Literatura najłatwiejsza
- 1950: Wiewiórcza mama
- 1951: Osiem lalek i jeden miś (play)
- 1954: KETSIS, Lubiński szczur
- 1957: O chłopcu, który szukał domu
- 1958: Kajtek, warszawski szpak
- 1960: Jak jeden malarz chciał namalować szczęśliwego motyla
- 1961: Ten obcy
- 1963: Rozbita szyba (short story)
- 1964: Niespokojne godziny
- 1966: Tort orzechowy (short story)
- 1968: Wszystko inaczej
- 1969: Niebezpieczna przygoda (short story)
- 1971: Ważne i nieważne
- 1975: Inna?
- 1982: Strategia czekania (autobiography)
- 1998: Byłam, byliśmy (autobiography)
