= Tomčić =

Tomčić (Serbian Cyrillic: Томчић) is a surname found in Croatia and Serbia. Notable people with the surname include:

- Čedomir Tomčić (born 1987), Serbian footballer
- Martina Tomčić (born 1975), Croatian opera singer
- Zlatko Tomčić (born 1945), Croatian politician
- Zoran Tomčić (born 1970), Croatian footballer
