= Marek Michalak =

Polish pedagog & politician (born 1971)

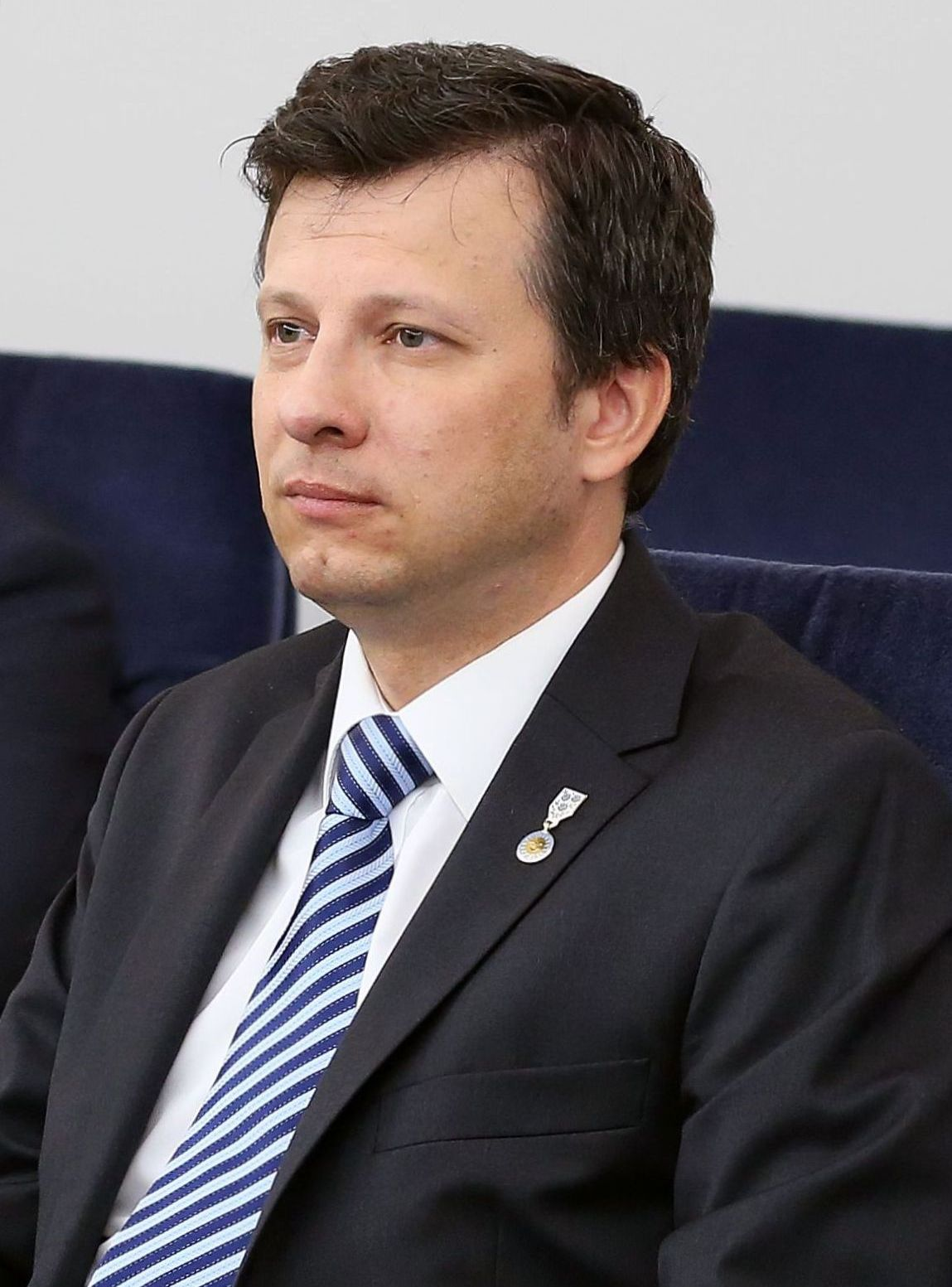
- Marek Michalak in the Senate of Poland
- Born: July 27, 1971 (age 55)
- Occupations: Pedagogue, Polish Commissioner for Children's Rights

Marek Michalak (born 27 July 1971 in Świdnica) is a Polish pedagogue and social activist. Since 2007, he has been the Chancellor of the Chapter of the Order of the Smile and from 2008 to 2018 the Polish Commissioner for Children's Rights.
