= Tomek Wilmowski =

Youth adventure novels by Alfred Szklarski

- 1. Tomek in the land of the kangaroos 2. Tomek on the Black Continent; 3. Tomek on war path 4. Tomek traces Yeti; 5. Tomek's secret expedition 6. Tomek among headhunters 7. Tomek at the source of Amazon; 8. Tomek in Gran Chaco; 9. Tomek in pharaohs' tombs 10. Tomek in Alasca
- Author: Alfred Szklarski; Adam Zelga (co-author of book 9); Maciej Dudziak (book 10)
- Country: Poland
- Language: Polish
- Genre: adventure novel, young adult fiction
- Published: 1957 - 1994 (series by original author); 2021 (last book)
- No. of books: 10

Tomek Wilmowski is a series of ten youth adventure novels created by Polish author Alfred Szklarski. The original series was published from 1957 to 1994. The last book, written by Maciej Dudziak, was published in 2021.

The title character, young traveler Tomek Wilmowski is the main protagonist of the novels. The books are stories about his adventures in different countries of the world. They are set in the beginning of 20th century. The other characters of the novels are Tomek's father Andrzej Wilmowski (geographer), sailor and comic relief of books Tadeusz Nowicki, mysterious traveller and animal hunter Jan Smuga, Australian friend and later Tomek's wife Sally Allan, his cousin Zbigniew Karski and his Russian wife Natasha. Tomek and his friends are Polish emigrants who must flee from the country under Russian occupation.

The books contain much geographical, historical, cultural and biological knowledge as well as humour and entertainment which is aimed at adolescents and young adults.

== The series ==
1. Tomek in the Land of Kangaroos (Tomek w krainie kangurów), 1957

- First adventure of Tomek in Australia.

2. Tomek on the Black Continent (Tomek na Czarnym Lądzie), 1958

- Tomek and his friends travel to Kenya and Uganda, where the heroes want to catch wild animals for a zoological garden.

3. Tomek on the warpath (Tomek na wojennej ścieżce), 1959

- Vacation of Tomek in the United States, where his friend Sally is staying and where she was kidnapped by Native Americans.

4. Tomek traces the Yeti (Tomek na tropach Yeti), 1961

- Tomek and his father and friend are seeking the traveller Jan Smuga, who was lost in Tibet.

5. Tomek's secret expedition (Tajemnicza wyprawa Tomka), 1963

- Tomek and his friend save Tomek's cousin, Zbigniew from Russian captivity.

6. Tomek among the headhunters (Tomek wśród łowców głów), 1965

- Tomek and his friends travel to Papua New Guinea.

7. Tomek at the source of the Amazon (Tomek u źródeł Amazonki), 1967

- Tomek and his friends save Jan Smuga, who is being held captive by an indigenous tribe in Brazil and chase the murderers of the owner of a plantation.

8. Tomek in Gran Chaco (Tomek w Gran Chaco), 1987

- Tomek's further adventures in South America.

9. Tomek in the Pharaohs' tombs (Tomek w grobowcach faraonów), 1994

- Tomek and his friends travel to Egypt.

10. Tomek in Alasca (Tomek na Alasce), 2021

- Tomek and Sally's expedition to Alasca.
