= Martin Tomášek =

Czech ice hockey left winger

- Born: September 2, 1978 (age 47) Bílovec, Czechoslovakia
- Height: 6 ft 2 in (188 cm)
- Weight: 209 lb (95 kg; 14 st 13 lb)
- Position: Centre
- Shot: Left
- Played for: HC Vítkovice; HC Sibir Novosibirsk; HK Poprad; MHk 32 Liptovský Mikuláš; Gothiques d'Amiens; HC Kopřivnice
- Playing career: 1997–2022

Martin Tomášek (born September 2, 1978) is a Czech professional ice hockey centre who plays for HC Kopřivnice of the 2nd Czech Republic Hockey League.

Tomášek played ten seasons in the Czech Extraliga for HC Vítkovice, playing in 399 regular season games for the team from 1997 to 2002 and again from 2003 to 2008. He also played in the Russian Superleague for HC Sibir Novosibirsk, the Tipsport Liga for HK Poprad and MHk 32 Liptovský Mikuláš and the Ligue Magnus for Gothiques d'Amiens

Tomásek played in the 1998 World Junior Ice Hockey Championships for the Czech Republic.

== Career statistics ==
| | | | Regular season | | | | | Playoffs |
| Season | Team | League | GP | G | A | Pts | PIM | GP | G | A | Pts | PIM |
|---|---|---|---|---|---|---|---|---|---|---|---|---|
| 1996–97 | Red Deer Rebels | WHL | 53 | 4 | 11 | 15 | 26 | 16 | 1 | 2 | 3 | 4 |
| 1997–98 | HC Vitkovice | Czech | 8 | 1 | 0 | 1 | 2 | 9 | 0 | 4 | 4 | 27 |
| 1998–99 | HC Vitkovice | Czech | 23 | 2 | 1 | 3 | 14 | 3 | 0 | 0 | 0 | 2 |
| 1999–00 | HC Vitkovice | Czech | 42 | 5 | 4 | 9 | 47 | — | — | — | — | — |
| 2000–01 | HC Vitkovice | Czech | 49 | 8 | 15 | 23 | 32 | 9 | 0 | 0 | 0 | 6 |
| 2001–02 | HC Vitkovice | Czech | 39 | 8 | 5 | 13 | 22 | 13 | 0 | 2 | 2 | 6 |
| 2002–03 | HC Sibir Novosibirsk | Russia | 47 | 3 | 10 | 13 | 77 | — | — | — | — | — |
| 2003–04 | HC Vitkovice | Czech | 51 | 15 | 13 | 28 | 64 | 6 | 2 | 2 | 4 | 6 |
| 2004–05 | HC Vitkovice | Czech | 43 | 1 | 1 | 2 | 24 | 12 | 0 | 1 | 1 | 16 |
| 2004–05 | HC Slezan Opava | Czech2 | 1 | 0 | 0 | 0 | 0 | — | — | — | — | — |
| 2005–06 | HC Vitkovice | Czech | 43 | 5 | 5 | 10 | 30 | — | — | — | — | — |
| 2005–06 | HK SKP Poprad | Slovak | 5 | 0 | 0 | 0 | 2 | 15 | 3 | 3 | 6 | 22 |
| 2006–07 | HC Vitkovice | Czech | 50 | 3 | 5 | 8 | 38 | — | — | — | — | — |
| 2006–07 | HC Ostrava | Czech2 | 1 | 0 | 0 | 0 | 0 | — | — | — | — | — |
| 2007–08 | HC Vitkovice | Czech | 51 | 8 | 3 | 11 | 46 | — | — | — | — | — |
| 2008–09 | HK 32 Liptovský Mikuláš | Slovak | 49 | 15 | 14 | 29 | 103 | 6 | 2 | 1 | 3 | 18 |
| 2009–10 | HK 32 Liptovský Mikuláš | Slovak | 41 | 13 | 16 | 29 | 66 | — | — | — | — | — |
| 2010–11 | Gothiques d'Amiens | Ligue Magnus | 26 | 15 | 22 | 37 | 32 | 9 | 3 | 5 | 8 | 20 |
| 2011–12 | Gothiques d'Amiens | Ligue Magnus | 25 | 13 | 11 | 24 | 20 | 10 | 4 | 10 | 14 | 16 |
| 2012–13 | HC Karvina | Czech3 | 3 | 2 | 7 | 9 | 0 | — | — | — | — | — |
| 2012–13 | Bisons de Neuilly-sur-Marne | France2 | 22 | 19 | 26 | 45 | 20 | 2 | 1 | 1 | 2 | 2 |
| 2013–14 | VEU Feldkirch | INL | 36 | 35 | 20 | 55 | 48 | 5 | 2 | 3 | 5 | 6 |
| 2014–15 | Bisons de Neuilly-sur-Marne | France2 | 18 | 6 | 7 | 13 | 16 | 2 | 1 | 1 | 2 | 2 |
| 2015–16 | HC Kopřivnice | Czech3 | 35 | 17 | 13 | 30 | 38 | 3 | 0 | 0 | 0 | 6 |
| 2016–17 | HC Kopřivnice | Czech3 | 34 | 20 | 23 | 43 | 30 | 3 | 1 | 1 | 2 | 4 |
| 2017–18 | HC Kopřivnice | Czech3 | 40 | 22 | 15 | 37 | 48 | 5 | 0 | 3 | 3 | 16 |
| 2018–19 | HC Kopřivnice | Czech3 | 30 | 14 | 16 | 30 | 30 | 4 | 1 | 2 | 3 | 6 |
| 2019–20 | HC Kopřivnice | Czech3 | 6 | 3 | 1 | 4 | 4 | — | — | — | — | — |
| 2019–20 | HC Studénka | Czech4 | 1 | 0 | 0 | 0 | 0 | — | — | — | — | — |
| 2021–22 | HC Studénka | Czech4 | 2 | 2 | 1 | 3 | 2 | 3 | 0 | 1 | 1 | 2 |
| Czech totals | | | 399 | 56 | 52 | 108 | 319 | 52 | 2 | 9 | 11 | 63 |
