= Adam Słodowy =

Polish inventor (1923–2019)

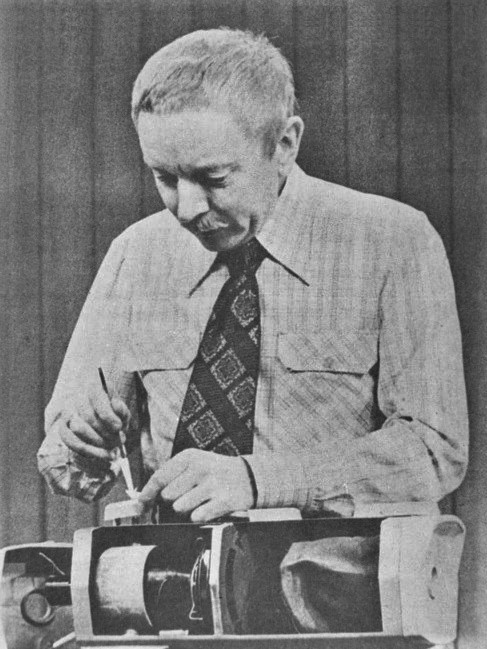
- „RTV”, magazine 1975,
- Born: 3 December 1923; Czarnków
- Died: 10 December 2019 (aged 96); Warsaw
- Education: Military Technical Academy

Adam Słodowy (December 3, 1923 – December 10, 2019) was a prominent Polish inventor, author, and TV host. Between 1959 and 1983, he hosted and produced a long-running Sunday morning TV show for children in Poland, entitled "Zrób to sam" ("Do It Yourself"). In 505 episodes the show taught its viewers how to make various toys and contraptions – from mini airplanes to working radios – with simple and everyday supplies, as children's toys in Poland in the years following WWII were difficult to come by.

Adam Słodowy was born in Czarnków, Poland. During the German occupation (1939–44) he first worked in a factory and then, in 1944, joined the Polish Army. Between 1950–58 Adam taught at the College of Air Defense Artillery in Koszalin and at the Military Technical Academy. He was awarded the rank of Major. After leaving the Army, Adam devoted his life to the popularization of inventing, engineering, and building which led him to develop a career in TV from 1959 on.

He authored books ranging from technical how-to's to fiction novels, both for children and adults. Several of his books have been translated to other languages and have collectively sold over 15 million copies worldwide. Adam wrote a popular Polish animated TV cartoon "Pomysłowy Dobromir" ("The Inventive Dobromir").

In 1972 Adam was awarded the Order of the Smile, an international honor bestowed by children upon adults whom they greatly respect and admire in all types of industries and organizations.

Adam Słodowy lived in Warsaw, Poland with his wife Bożena. He retired from regular television work, but continued to make TV appearances and work on various advertising campaigns. He had two sons; Wojciech, a physician residing in Chicago, USA, and Peter, a mathematician and physicist residing in Melbourne, Australia.

Słodowy died on 10 December 2019 at the age of 96.

== Books ==
- Diabły drzemią na ścianach, 1993 (Devils dozing on the walls)
- Majsterkowanie dla każdego, 1985 (DIY for everyone)
- Lubię majsterkować, 1984 (I like to tinker)
- Majsterkuję narzędziami EMA-COMBI, 1984, (DIY tools EMA-Combi (power tools))
- Samochód bez tajemnic 1978 (A car without secrets)
- Umiem majstrować, 1964 (I can tinker)
- To wcale nie jest trudne 1963 (It is not difficult)
- Jeżdżę Samochodem Škoda 1000MB 1967 (I drive a Skoda 1000MB)
- Podręcznik kierowcy-amatora, 1960 (Driver Manual – amateur)
- Budowa samochodu amatorskiego 1958 (The construction of an amateur car)
