= Tomczak =

Tomczak is a Polish surname. Notable people with the surname include:

- Bartłomiej Tomczak (born 1985), Polish handball player
- Beatrice Tomczak (born 1995), Polish-German ice dancer
- Jacek Tomczak (born 1973), Polish politician
- Jacek Tomczak (born 1990), Polish chess grandmaster
- Kazimierz Tomczak (1883–1967), Polish bishop
- Larry Tomczak, American pastor
- Mike Tomczak (born 1962), American football player
- Witold Tomczak (born 1957), Polish politician

== See also ==
- Nicole Tomczak-Jaegermann (1945–2022), Polish-Canadian mathematician
