= Maria Biliżanka =

Theatre director, playwright and actor (1901–1988)

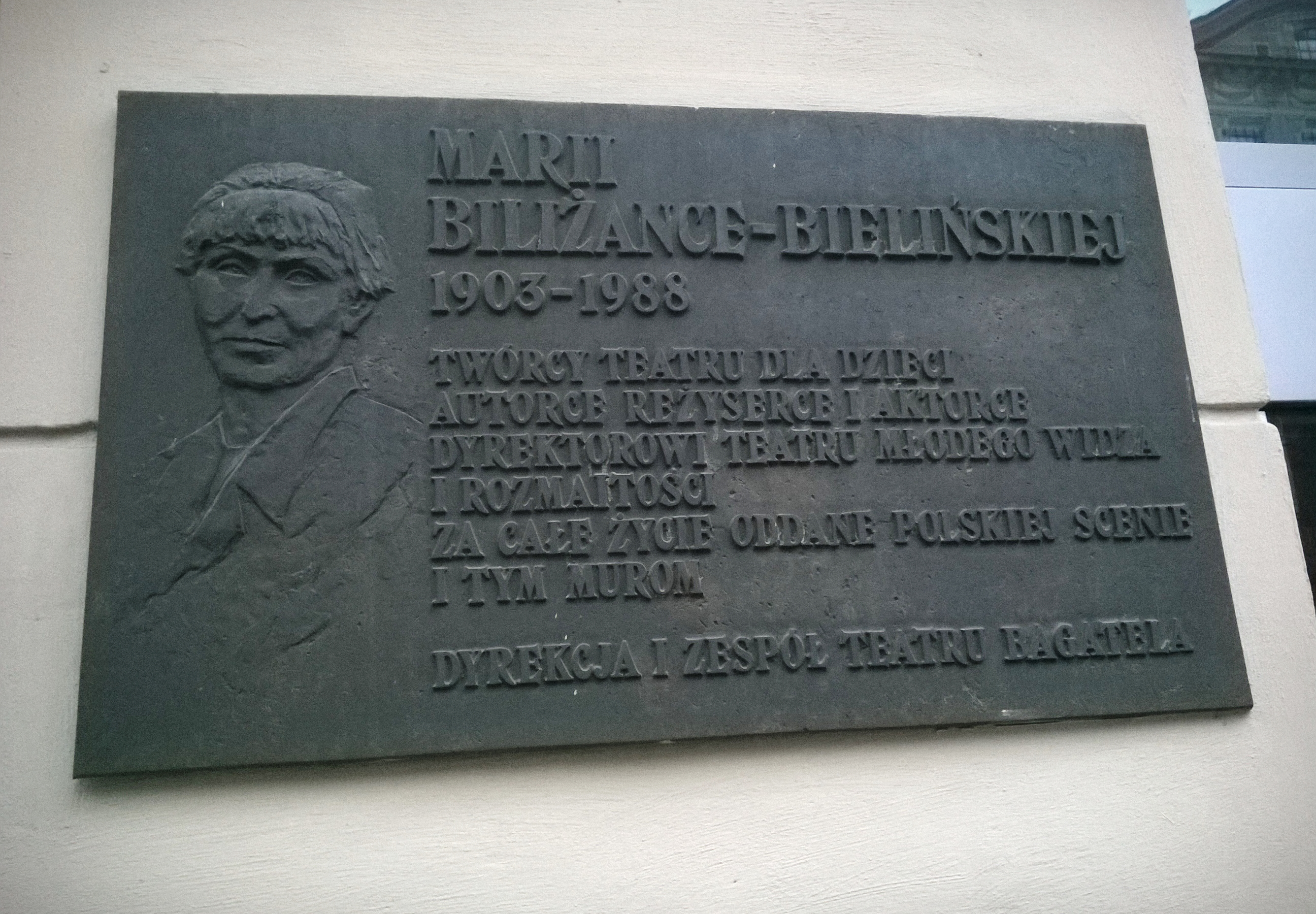
- A plaque commemorating Maria Biliżanka at Karmelicka Street, Kraków
- Born: 19 January 1901; Kolbuszowa near Rzeszów
- Died: 8 June 1988 (aged 87); Kraków

Maria Biliżanka (19 January 1901 – 8 June 1988) was a theatre director, playwright and actor of Jewish descent.

== Biography ==
In 1946 she founded Teatr dla Dzieci Wesoła Gromadka in Kraków, later renamed Teatr Młodego Widza.

Her remainings were buried at the Rakowicki Cemetery.

== Awards ==
- Gold Cross of Merit (21 September 1950)
- Knight's Cross of the Order of Polonia Restituta (22 July 1953)
- Prime Minister's Award for Creative Work for Young People (1955)
- Order of the Smile (1984)
