= Zbigniew Herman =

Polish physician and pharmacologist (1935–2010)

Zbigniew Stanisław Herman (17 December 1935 in Tłuste – 4 May 2010) was a Polish physician and pharmacologist, rector of Silesian Medical Academy in years 1980–1982. He was decorated with an Officer's Cross and with a Commander's Cross with Star of Polonia Restituta.

The Polish Academy of Arts and Sciences awards the Anna née Dyaczyńska and Zbigniew Herman Research Scholarship to young physicians.
