= Martin Tomek =

Czech footballer

Personal information
- Date of birth: 12 September 1969 (age 57)
- Place of birth: Czech Republic
- Position: Goalkeeper

Senior career*
Years	Team	Apps	(Gls)
1995–1996	SK Chrudim 1887		
1996–1998	AFK Atlantic Lázně Bohdaneč	12	(0)
1998–1999	FC MUS Most 1996		
1999–2000	FK Mladá Boleslav		
2005	TJ Dvůr Králové		
2012–2017	SK Roudnice		
2017–2019	TJ Sokol Stěžery		
- * Club domestic league appearances and goals

Martin Tomek (born 12 September 1969) is a retired Czech goalkeeper.
