= Tomášek =

Tomášek (feminine Tomášková) is a common Czech surname, meaning "little Thomas". Notable people include:

- Bohumil Tomášek (1936–2019), Czech basketball player
- David Tomášek (born 1996), Czech professional ice hockey player
- František Tomášek (1899–1992), archbishop of Prague, cardinal
- Josef Tomášek (1904–1979), Czech water polo player
- Juraj Tomášek (born 1988), Slovak football midfielder
- Martin Tomášek (born 1978), Czech ice hockey player
- Rudolf Tomášek (1937–2025), Czech pole vaulter
- Václav Tomášek (1774–1850), Czech composer
