= Wanda Chotomska =

Polish children's writer, screenwriter and poet

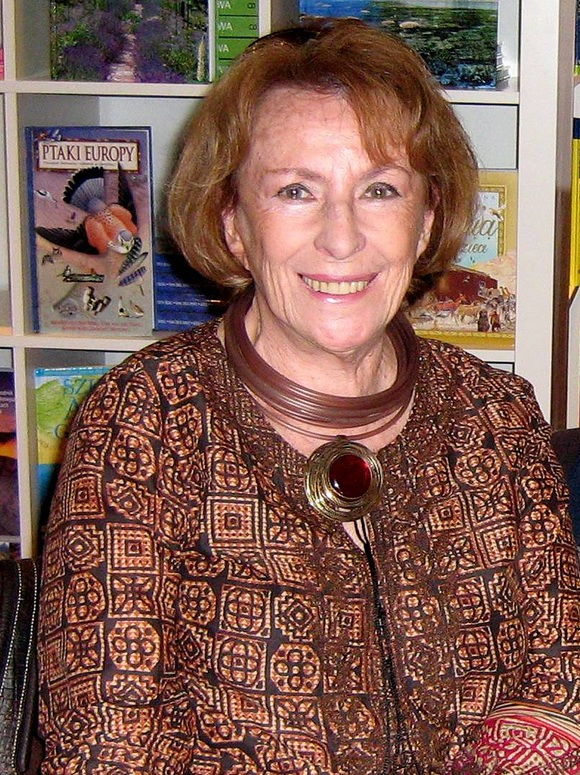
- Chotomska in 2007
- Born: Wanda Marie Chotomska; 26 October 1929; Warsaw, Poland
- Died: 2 August 2017 (aged 87); Warsaw, Poland
- Occupations: Writer, screenwriter, poet
- Writing career
- Years active: 1949–2017
- Genre: Children's literature
- Notable work: Jacek i Agatka

Wanda Maria Chotomska (26 October 1929 – 2 August 2017) was a Polish children's writer, screenwriter and poet. She was notable for being the screenwriter of the Jacek i Agatka television series.

== Biography ==
She was born in Warsaw.

Her poems include: Wiersze pod psem (1959), Siedem księżyców (1970), Tańce polskie (1981), Kram z literami (1987), Wiersze dla dzieci (1997), and Wanda Chotomska dla najmłodszych (2000).

Chotomska died in Warsaw on 2 August 2017 at the age of 87.
