= Order of the Smile =

International award

Order of the Smile Order Uśmiechu

Awarded by the International Chapter of the Order of the Smile
- Type: Single grade order
- Established: 1968
- Motto: Dobro wszystkich dzieci na świecie najwyższym celem ludzi szlachetnych (The welfare of all children in the world is the highest goal of noble people)
- Eligibility: Adults
- Status: Currently awarded
- Chancellor: Marek Michalak
- Grades: Knight
- Website: orderusmiechu.pl
- Ribbon bar of the order

The Order of the Smile (Polish: Order Uśmiechu) is an international award given by children to adults distinguished in their love, care and aid for children.

== History ==
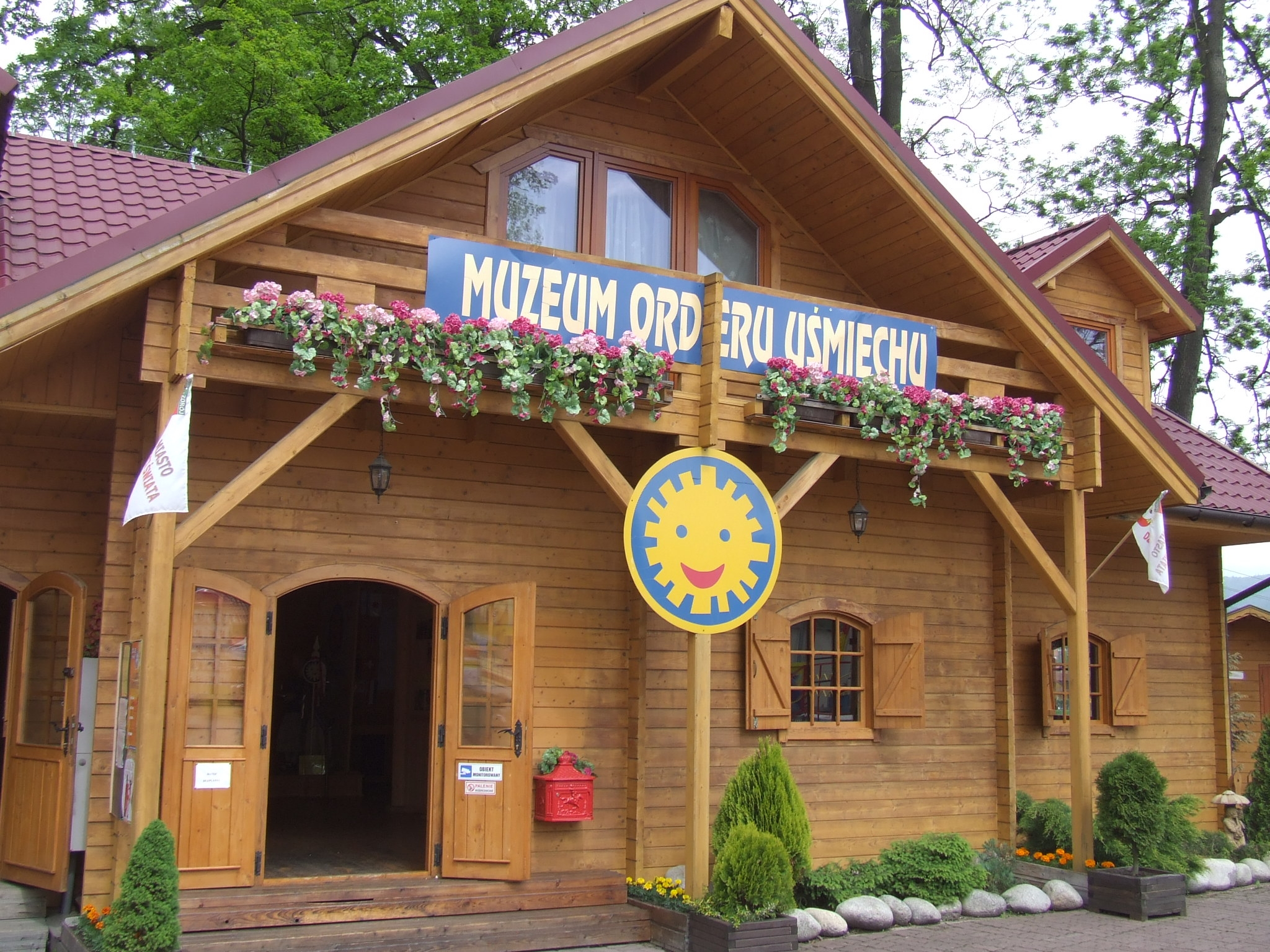
Museum of the Order of the Smile

The idea of the Order of the Smile was established in 1968 by the Polish magazine Kurier Polski, inspired by Wanda Chotomska. In 1979 (announced by the UNESCO as the International Year of the Child) the Secretary-General of the United Nations Kurt Waldheim officially recognized the Order. From then, the Order of the Smile became an international order.

In 1996, in Rabka, the Order of the Smile Museum was established on the grounds of the family park known as "Rabkoland." After the region had been given the official status of the "City of Children from around the World," an initiative was put forward to open a permanent Polish Santa's Village, which would accept letters addressed to Santa Claus from children across Poland.

In 2003 an International Chapter of the Order of the Smile session took place outside the Warsaw headquarters in Świdnica, where the Child Friendship Center was being erected. Świdnica had been officially titled the "Capital of Children's Dreams," and 21 September 2003 was declared Order of the Smile Children's Day.

== Design ==
Chotomska's television series Jacek i Agatka announced a competition to submit a design for the Order of the Smile. The award's logo was created and developed by a nine-year-old girl from Głuchołazy, Ewa Chrobak. Using a plate as a template, she drew a sun, and added uneven rays of light. The design, one of 45,000 that had been submitted, was chosen by Szymon Kobyliński, who elaborated it into its current form.

== Nomination ==
All candidates for the Order of Smile should be nominated by children. Nominations can come from a single child or collectively from many children. Nominations can be submitted from all around the world. The candidates should be people of extraordinary love and work for children. Nominations should be sent to the International Chapter of the Order of Smile (ICOS). Afterwards the candidates are chosen to be Laureates by the Chapter.

The Order is awarded twice a year: in spring and in fall. Laureates of the Order of Smile include now about 1000 people from almost 50 countries (state of April 2016).

== Decorating ==
The medal - which is a badge representing a smiling sun - is awarded in Warsaw, Poland by the International Chapter of the Order of the Smile. There is a special procedure of the decoration. In special cases the decoration could be held outside Poland, in the country of the laureate. The right to use the title of the "Knight of the Order of Smile" is guaranteed only to those who were decorated at an official ceremony organized by the Chapter.

Traditionally, upon being awarded with the medal, each recipient must drink a glass of lemon juice while smiling throughout the process.

== International Chapter ==
Although most of the 59 members of the Chapter are of Polish descent, it includes representatives from other countries such as Argentina, Armenia, Australia, Azerbaijan, Belarus, Belgium, Canada, the Czech Republic, Finland, France, Georgia, Germany, Hungary, Iran, Israel, Italy, Japan, Lithuania, Romania, Russia, Serbia, Sudan, Tunisia, Ukraine, the United Kingdom and the United States.

At the forefront of the International Chapter of the Order of Smile stands the Chancellor, Marek Michalak, who remains in this position since 19 January 2007. Previous Chancellors include: Ewa Szelburg-Zarembina (from 1968 to 1976), Radoslaw Ostrowicz (from 1982 to 1990), and Cezary Leżenski (from 1976 to 1981, and again from 1992 to 2006).

On 16 November 1992, the International Chapter of the Order of Smile was officially registered in Poland as an association.
