= Flatow (district) =

Former administrative division

- District of Prussia
- 1818–1945
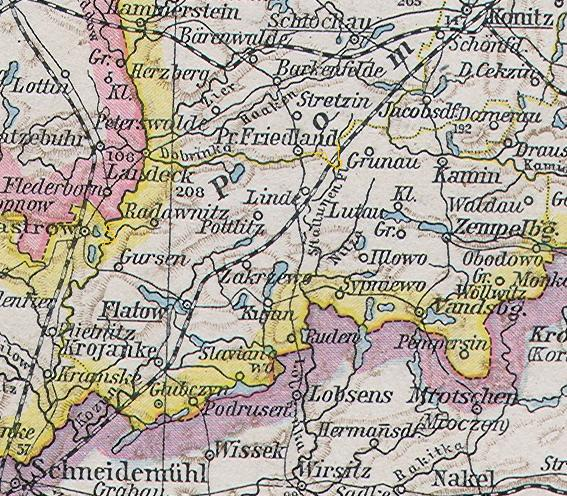
- Map from 1890
- Capital: Flatow (Złotów)
- History
  - Established: 1818
  - Disestablished: 1945
- Today part of: Poland

Province of West Prussia Regierungsbezirk Danzig Regierungsbezirk Marienwerder

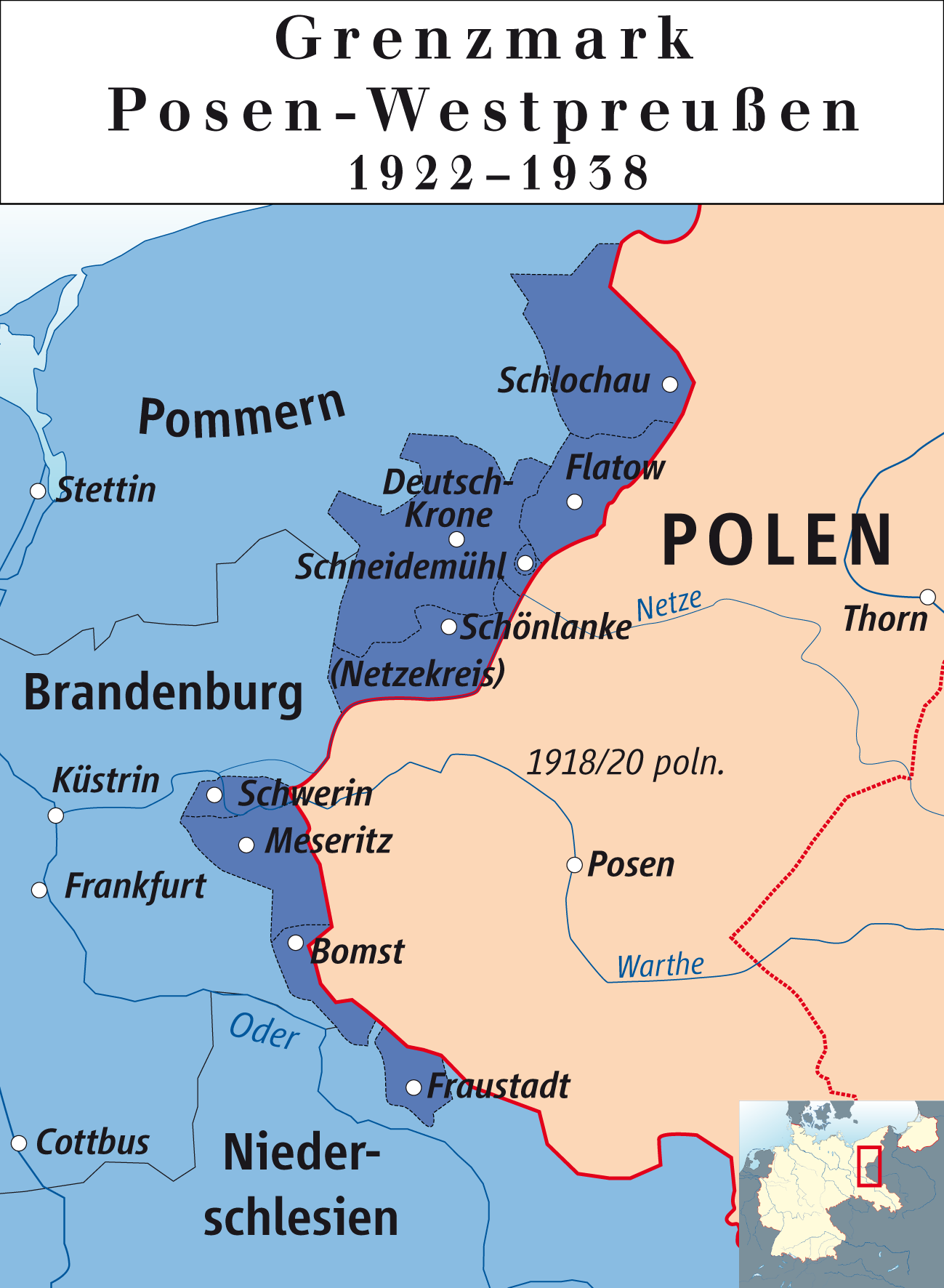
Province of Posen-West Prussia (1938)

The Flatow district was a district that existed from 1818 to 1945 in the Kingdom of Prussia and Germany. It belonged to the province of West Prussia until 1920. After World War I, the eastern portion of the district was ceded to Poland. The western portion of the district remained in Germany and became part of the Frontier March of Posen-West Prussia until 1938. The district then became part of the Province of Pomerania from 1938 to 1945. Today the territory of the Flatow district lies in the Kuyavian-Pomeranian Voivodeship and the Greater Poland Voivodeship in Poland.

== History ==
The area of the Flatow district originally belonged to the Netze District, which was annexed by Prussia in the First Partition of Poland in 1772. In 1815, the area around Flatow became part of Regierungsbezirk Marienwerder in the province of West Prussia. The Flatow district was founded on 1 April 1818. It consisted of the five towns Flatow, Kamin, Krojanke, Vandsburg and Zempelburg. The capital of the district was the town of Flatow. From 1829 to 1878, West Prussia and East Prussia were united to form the Province of Prussia, which belonged to the German Empire from 1871. The district was subjected to Germanisation policies.

After World War I, when the Treaty of Versailles came into force on 10 January 1920, the eastern part of the Flatow district with the towns of Więcbork, Sępólno Krajeńskie and Kamień Krajeński was restored to Poland, which just regained independence. 30,516 people lived there, of whom 8,600 were Poles.

On 1 July 1922 the new Prussian province of Grenzmark Posen-West Prussia was formed, which included the Flatow district. In the same year, the Flatow district was enlarged with the inclusion of the rural community of Schönfeld, which was earlier part of the Kolmar district. On 1 October 1938 the Flatow district was incorporated into the Province of Pomerania after the Posen-West Prussia province was dissolved.

From 1933, Głos Pogranicza i Kaszub, a local Polish newspaper, was issued in the district capital.

Under the Nazi government, repressions of Poles intensified. In January 1939, Germany resumed expulsions of Poles and many were also forced to flee. The Sturmabteilung, Schutzstaffel, Hitler Youth and Bund Deutscher Osten launched attacks on Polish institutions, schools and activists. In mid-1939 the Gestapo carried out arrests of Polish activists, teachers and entrepreneurs. The Poles tried to resist German persecution, but some were forced to escape German arrest and thus fled to Poland.

Flatow district in the Province of Pomerania (1939)

During the German invasion of Poland, which started World War II in September 1939, persecution further intensified with mass arrests of Polish activists, who were detained in temporary camps in Lipka and the neighbouring city of Piła, and then deported to concentration camps, as well as expulsions and closure of Polish schools and enterprises. During the war, the German Nazi government operated several forced labour subcamps of the Stalag II-B prisoner-of-war camp in the district. In the spring of 1945, the Flatow district was occupied by the Red Army. After the end of World War II, the district became again part of Poland under the terms of the Potsdam Agreement.

== Demographics ==
The district had a German majority population, with a significant Polish minority. After 1920, with the loss of the eastern part of the district, the remainder of the district in Germany had a Polish minority of 16.8% (including bilinguals) according to the census of 1925.

Population of the Flatow district
| | 1831 | | 1852 | | 1910 | |
|---|---|---|---|---|---|---|
| German | 22,012 | 61.0% | 38,139 | 72.3% | 50,648 | 73.2% |
| Polish / Bilingual / Other | 14,054 | 39.0% | 14,622 | 27.7% | 18,538 | 26.8% |
| Total | 36,066 | | 52,761 | | 69,186 | |

== Elections ==
In the German Empire, the Flatow district together with the Schlochau district formed the Marienwerder 7 Reichstag constituency. This constituency was usually won by conservative candidates:

- 1871: Botho Heinrich zu Eulenburg, German Conservative Party
- 1874: Botho Heinrich zu Eulenburg, German Conservative Party
- 1877: Botho Heinrich zu Eulenburg, German Conservative Party
- 1878: Adalbert von Flottwell, German Conservative Party
- 1881: Viktor von Tepper-Laski, Free Conservative Party
- 1884: Wilhelm Scheffer, German Conservative Party
- 1887: Wilhelm Scheffer, German Conservative Party
- 1890: Wilhelm Scheffer, German Conservative Party
- 1893: Georg von Kanitz, German Conservative Party
- 1898: Robert Hilgendorff, German Conservative Party
- 1903: Otto Böckler, German Reform Party
- 1907: Fritz Wilckens, German Conservative Party
- 1912: Wilhelm von Knigge, German Conservative Party

== Municipalities ==
=== Municipalities ceded to Poland in 1920 ===
The eastern part of the district, which was ceded to Poland in 1920 included the following towns and communities:

- Damerau
- Eichfelde
- Groß Loßburg
- Groß Lutau
- Groß Wisniewke
- Groß Wöllwitz
- Groß Zirkwitz
- Grünlinde
- Hohenfelde
- Illowo
- Jasdrowo
- Jastrzembke
- Kamin in Westpreußen, town
- Klein Lutau
- Klein Wisniewke
- Klein Wöllwitz
- Klein Zirkwitz
- Klotzbuden
- Komierowo
- Lilienhecke
- Lindebuden
- Lubcza
- Neu Waldau
- Nichors
- Obendorf
- Obkaß
- Pempersin
- Petznick
- Plötzig
- Radonsk
- Rogalin
- Salesch
- Schmilowo
- Schönhorst
- Schönwalde
- Sechau
- Seemark
- Sittnow
- Soßnow
- Suchoronczek
- Sypniewo
- Vandsburg, town
- Waldau
- Waldowke
- Wilkowo
- Wittkau
- Wittun
- Wordel
- Zempelburg, town
- Zempelkowo

=== Municipalities in 1945 ===
At the end of its existence in 1945, the district comprised two towns and 66 other municipalities

- Adlig Landeck
- Aspenau
- Augustendorf
- Battrow
- Blankwitt
- Böck
- Buschdorf
- Conradsfelde
- Deutsch Fier
- Dobrin
- Espenhagen
- Flatow, town
- Friedrichsbruch
- Glumen
- Gresonse
- Groß Butzig
- Groß Friedrichsberg
- Grunau
- Gursen
- Hammer
- Hohenfier
- Kappe
- Karlsdorf
- Kietz
- Kirschdorf
- Klein Butzig
- Klein Friedrichsberg
- Kleschin
- Kölpin
- Königsdorf
- Krojanke, town
- Krummenfließ
- Kujan
- Lanken
- Lessendorf
- Linde
- Lugetal
- Mittel Friedrichsberg
- Neu Battrow
- Neu Butzig
- Neu Grunau
- Neuhof
- Petzin
- Posenberg
- Pottlitz
- Preußenfeld
- Proch
- Radawnitz
- Ruden
- Sakollnow
- Schmirdau
- Schmirtenau
- Schwente
- Schönfeld
- Seedorf (Grenzmark)
- Seefelde
- Steinau
- Steinmark
- Stewnitz
- Straßfurt
- Tarnowke
- Treuenheide
- Wengerz
- Wilhelmsbruch
- Wilhelmssee
- Wittenburg
- Wonzow
- Ziskau

=== Place names ===
In the course of the 20th century, many place names in the district which were considered "not German" enough were given a phonetic alignment or translation:

- Augustowo → Augustendorf, 1914
- Cziskowo → Ziskau, 1912
- Dollnik → Wittenburg, 1926
- Glubschin → Steinau, 1926
- Hüttenbusch → Wilhelmsbruch, 1928
- Klukowo → Blankenfelde, 1928
- Leßnick → Lessendorf, 1926
- Obodowo → Obendorf, 1908
- Ossowke → Espenhagen, 1926
- Ossowo → Aspenau, 1926
- Paruschke → Treuenheide, 1926
- Petzewo → Deutsch Fier, 1926
- Podrusen → Preußenfeld, 1927
- Polnisch Wisniewke → Lugetal, 1913
- Skietz → Kietz, 1926
- Slawianowo → Steinmark, 1939
- Smirdowo bei Flatow → Schmirdau, 1909
- Smirdowo bei Krojanke → Schmirtenau, 1909
- Wersk → Seedorf, 1926
- Zakrzewke → Seemark, 1907
- Zakrzewo → Buschdorf, 1935
