= Potulice (disambiguation) =

Potulice is a village in Kuyavian-Pomeranian Voivodeship (north-central Poland).

Potulice may also refer to:

- Potulice, Wągrowiec County in Greater Poland Voivodeship (west-central Poland)
- Potulice, Złotów County in Greater Poland Voivodeship (west-central Poland)
