= Trudna =

- Village
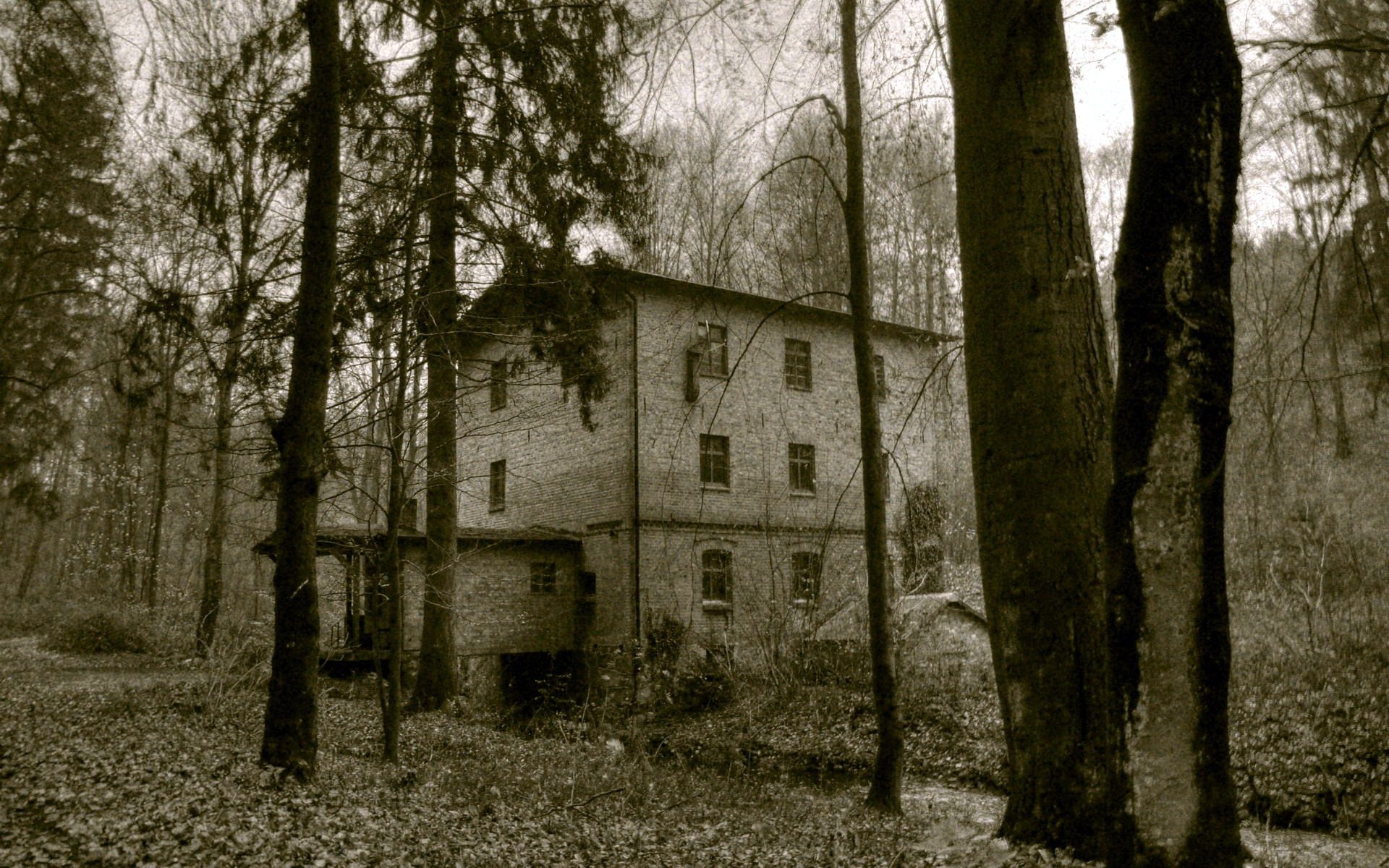
- Old watermill in Trudna

- Location within Poland
- Coordinates: 53°32′16″N 17°5′27″E
- Country: Poland
- Voivodeship: Greater Poland
- County: Złotów
- Gmina: Lipka
- Population: 140
- Time zone: UTC+1 (CET)
  - Summer (DST): UTC+2 (CEST)
- Vehicle registration: PZL

Trudna [ˈtrudna] is a village in the administrative district of Gmina Lipka, within Złotów County, Greater Poland Voivodeship, in north-central Poland.

It is situated on the Debrzynka River in ethnocultural region of Krajna in northern Greater Poland, on its border with Pomerania.

== History ==
The territory became a part of the emerging Polish state under its first historic ruler Mieszko I in the 10th century. Trudna was a private village of Polish nobility, administratively located in the Nakło County in the Kalisz Voivodeship in the Greater Poland Province. It was annexed by Prussia in the First Partition of Poland in 1772, and from 1871 to 1945 it was part of Germany.
