= Gmina Lipka =

Gmina Lipka Lipka Commune
- Gmina
- Flag Coat of arms
- Interactive map of Gmina Lipka
- Coordinates (Lipka): 53°29′50″N 17°15′3″E
- Country: Poland
- Voivodeship: Greater Poland
- County: Złotów
- Seat: Lipka

Area
  - Total: 191.01 km^{2} (73.75 sq mi)

Population (2006)
  - Total: 5,561
  - Density: 29.11/km^{2} (75.40/sq mi)
- Website: http://www.lipka.pnet.pl

Gmina Lipka is a rural gmina (administrative district) in Złotów County, Greater Poland Voivodeship, in west-central Poland. Its seat is the village of Lipka, which lies approximately 21 kilometres (13 mi) north-east of Złotów and 124 km (77 mi) north of the regional capital Poznań.

The gmina covers an area of 191.01 square kilometres (73.7 sq mi), and as of 2006 its total population is 5,561.

== Villages ==
Gmina Lipka contains the villages and settlements of Batorówko, Batorowo, Białobłocie, Bługowo, Czyżkówko, Czyżkowo, Debrzno-Wieś, Huta, Kiełpin, Łąkie, Łąkie-Gogolin, Laskowo, Lipka, Mały Buczek, Nowe Potulice, Nowy Buczek, Osowo, Potulice, Scholastykowo, Smolnica, Stołuńsko, Trudna and Wielki Buczek.

== Neighbouring gminas ==
Gmina Lipka is bordered by the gminas of Debrzno, Okonek, Sępólno Krajeńskie, Więcbork, Zakrzewo and Złotów.
