= Pogórze =

Pogórze may refer to the following places in Poland:

- Pogórze, Gdynia, a district of the city of Gdynia
- Pogórze, Opole Voivodeship (south-west Poland)
- Pogórze, Pomeranian Voivodeship (north Poland)
- Pogórze, Silesian Voivodeship (south Poland)
- Pogórze, Greater Poland Voivodeship (west-central Poland)
