= Lipka, Złotów County =

Lipka
- Village
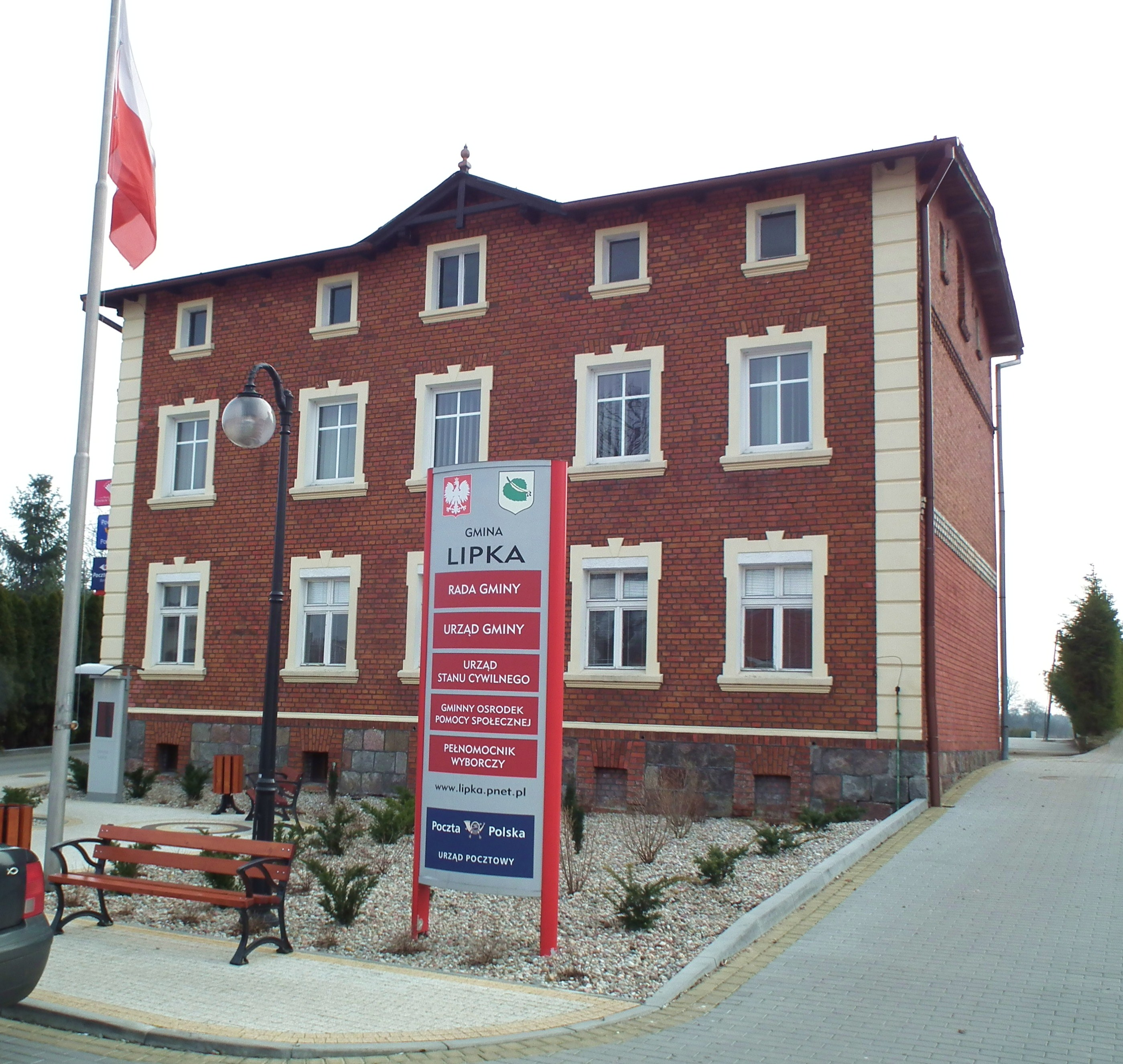
- Gmina Lipka municipal office

- Location within Poland
- Coordinates: 53°29′50″N 17°15′3″E
- Country: Poland
- Voivodeship: Greater Poland
- County: Złotów
- Gmina: Lipka

Population
  - Total: 2,200
- Time zone: UTC+1 (CET)
  - Summer (DST): UTC+2 (CEST)
- Vehicle registration: PZL
- Website: http://www.lipka.pnet.pl/

Lipka [ˈlipka] (German: Linde) is a village in Złotów County, Greater Poland Voivodeship, in north-central Poland. It is the seat of the gmina (administrative district) called Gmina Lipka. It is situated in the ethnocultural region of Krajna in northern Greater Poland.

== History ==
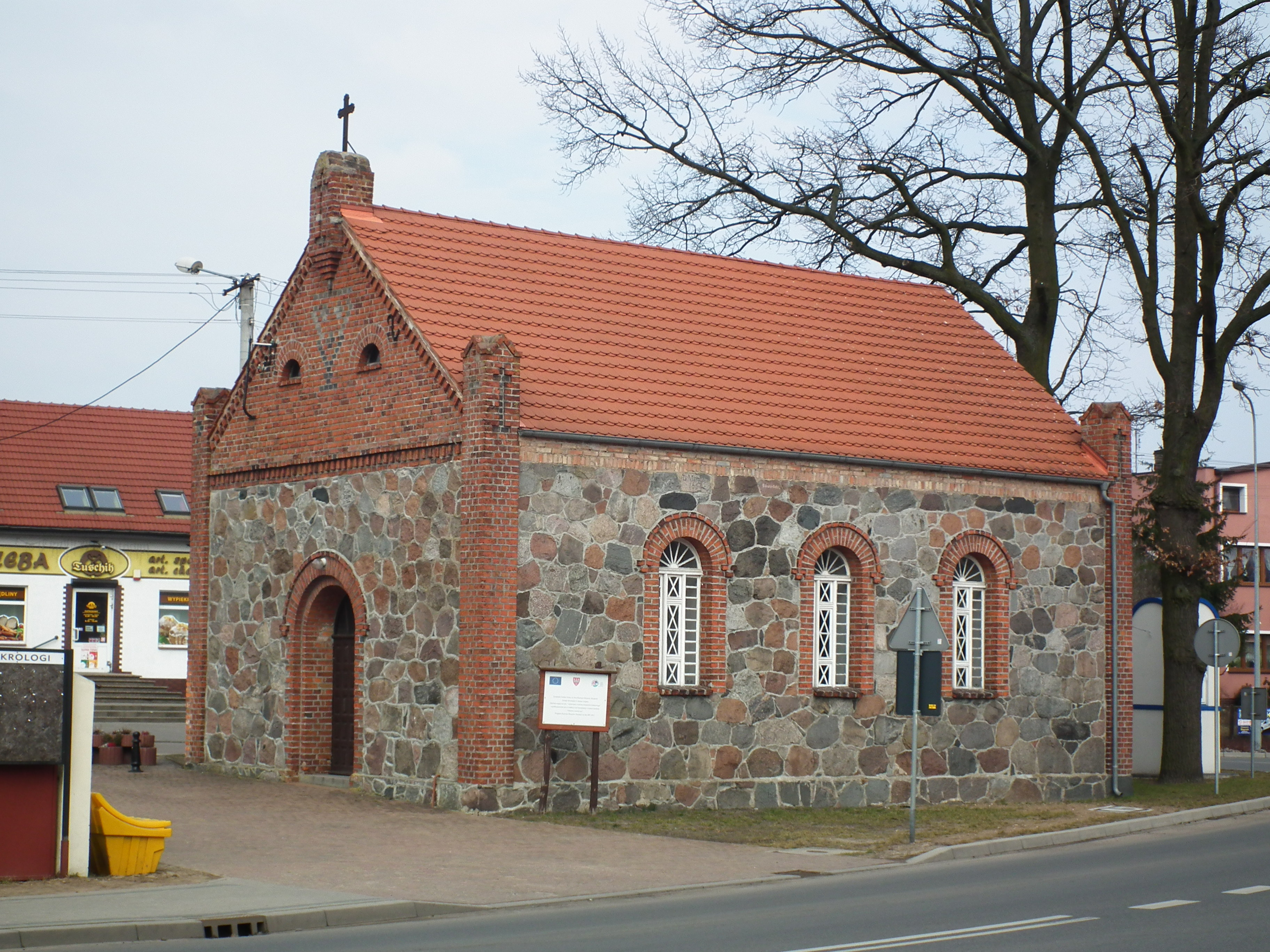
Old church in Lipka

The territory became a part of the emerging Polish state under its first historic ruler Mieszko I in the 10th century. Lipka was a private village of Polish nobility, administratively located in the Nakło County in the Kalisz Voivodeship in the Greater Poland Province of the Kingdom of Poland. It was annexed by Prussia in the First Partition of Poland in 1772.

Since 1871, the village, known in German as Linde, belonged to Germany, within which it formed part of the Flatow district in the administrative regions of Posen-West Prussia and Pomerania. It grew as a result of the construction of the Prussian Eastern Railway, with the railway station located in the village serving as the main station for the town of Preussisch Friedland (Debrzno) and numerous other market towns.

In the 19th century, potato cultivation was an essential livelihood for the residents, whose products went as far as the Ruhr area and the Netherlands. A starch factory, building material works, a brickworks and a dairy were some other businesses in the village. At the end of the 19th century, the first electrically powered threshing machine in Prussia was used there. In 1939, the village had 1,613 residents. During the German invasion of Poland, which started World War II in September 1939, the village was the site of a temporary camp for arrested Poles from the region, including activists, teachers and priests, who were afterwards deported to concentration camps (see Nazi crimes against the Polish nation). Towards the end of war, the Red Army occupied the region in the spring of 1945. After the war, the village was restored to Poland under its historic Polish name Lipka.

From 1975 to 1998 the village belonged to Piła Voivodeship.

== Transport ==
There is a train station in the village.
