= Głubczyn =

- Village
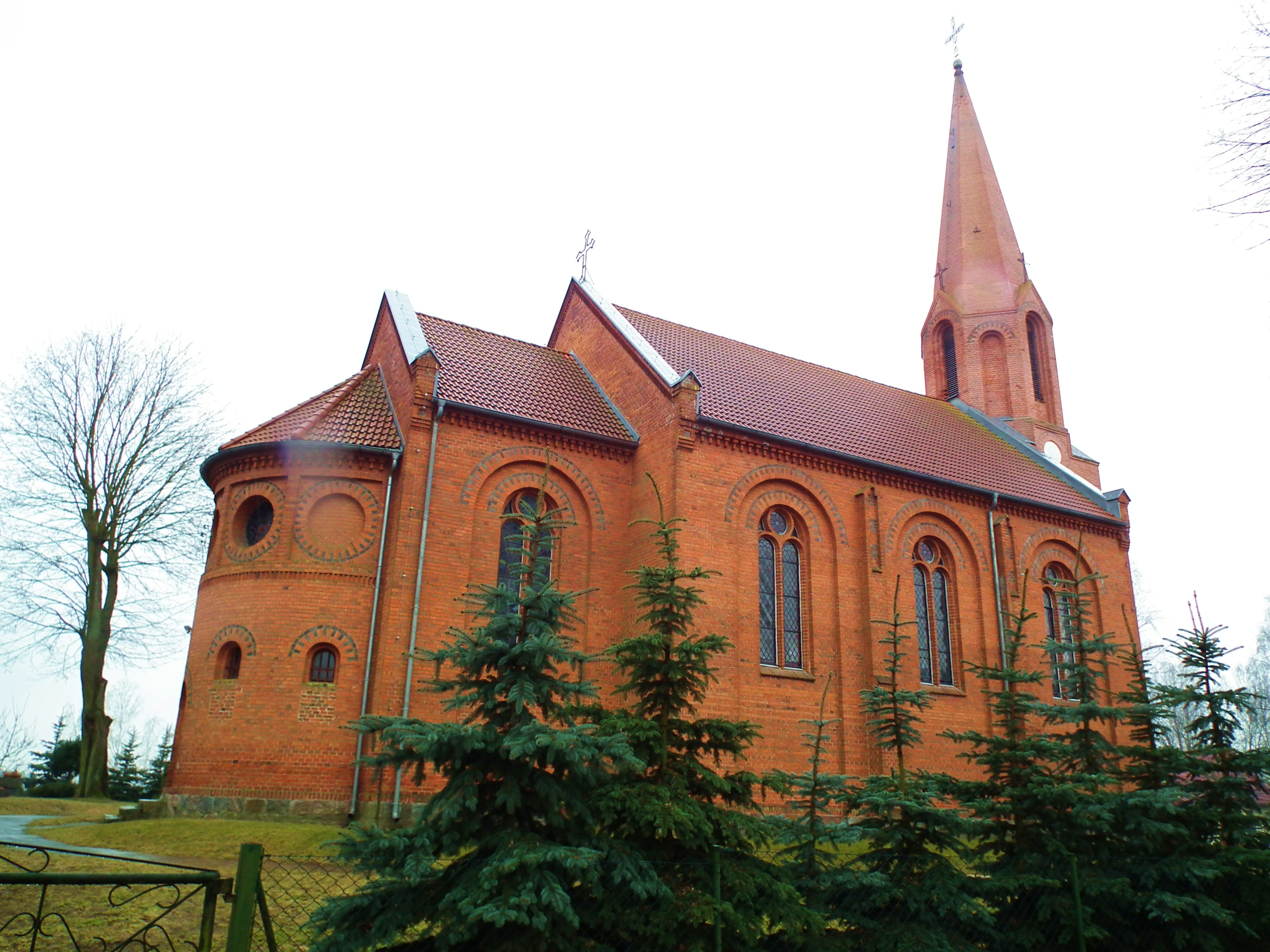
- Church of St. John in Głubczyn

- Location within Poland
- Coordinates: 53°15′N 16°58′E
- Country: Poland
- Voivodeship: Greater Poland
- County: Złotów
- Gmina: Krajenka
- Population: 490
- Time zone: UTC+1 (CET)
  - Summer (DST): UTC+2 (CEST)
- Vehicle registration: PZL

Głubczyn [ˈɡwupt͡ʂɨn] is a village in the administrative district of Gmina Krajenka, within Złotów County, Greater Poland Voivodeship, in north-central Poland.

== History ==
The territory became a part of the emerging Polish state under its first historic ruler Mieszko I in the 10th century. Głubczyn was a private village of Polish nobility, including the Danaborski, Kościelecki, Grudziński and Gorzeński families, administratively located in the Nakło County in the Kalisz Voivodeship in the Greater Poland Province. The Catholic church and parish were founded by abbot of Bledzew Andrzej Kościelecki in 1588.

It was annexed by Prussia in the First Partition of Poland in 1772, and from 1871 it was also part of Germany. Despite the partitions, it remained a possession of Polish nobility, including the Gorzeński, Grabowski and Bojanowski families. In German it was initially known as Glubczyn, before the German government renamed it to Glubschin in 1909, and then to Steinau in 1926 in attempt to erase traces of Polish origin. The Nazi German Bund Deutscher Osten organization attacked and devastated the local Polish school. In September 1939, the Germans arrested local Polish activist and Catholic priest Maksymilian Grochowski (see Nazi crimes against the Polish nation). After Germany's defeat in World War II, in 1945, the village became again part of Poland and its historic name was restored.
