= Wielki Buczek, Złotów County =

Wielki Buczek
- Village
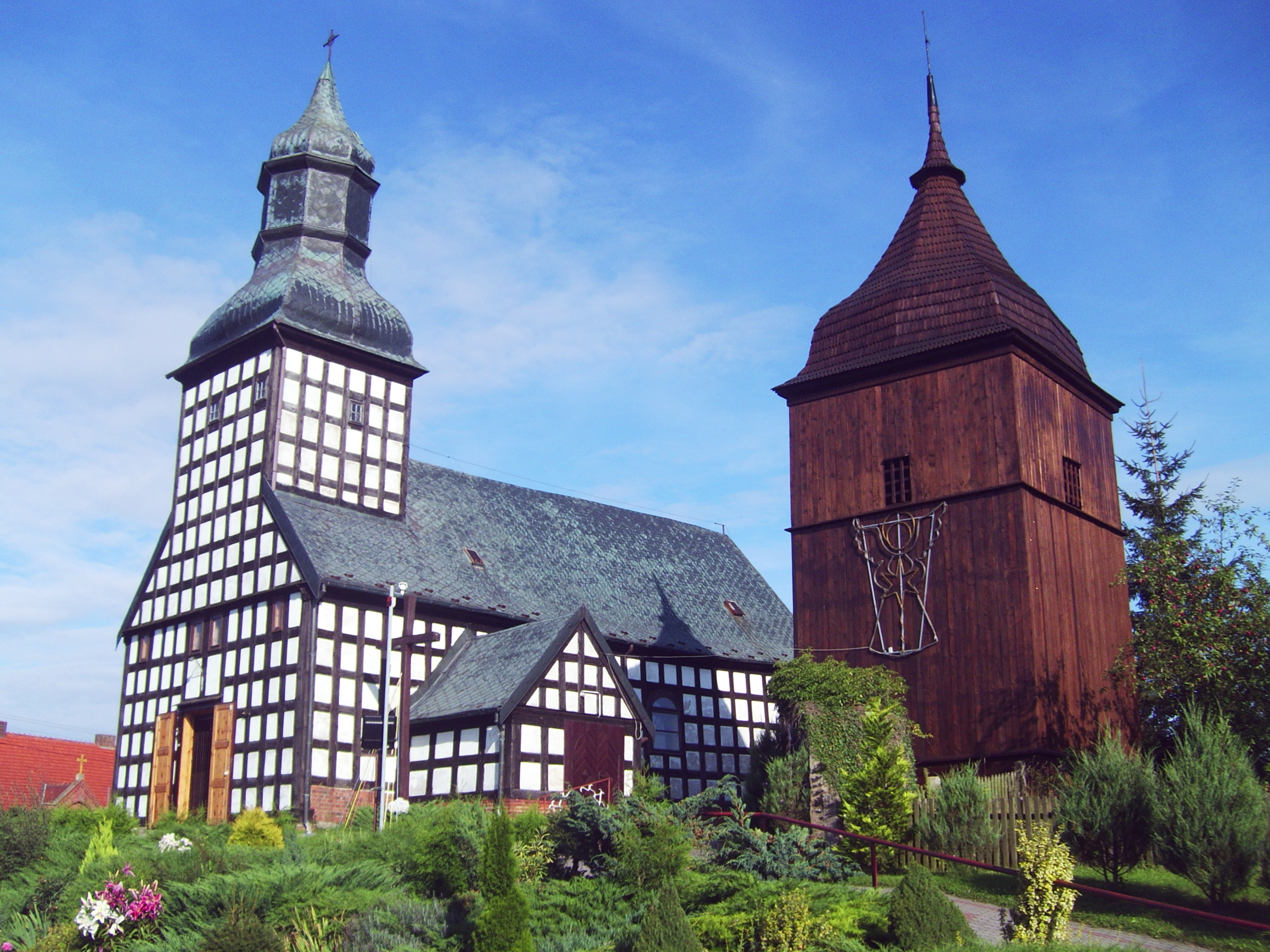
- Holy Trinity church in Wielki Buczek

- Location within Poland
- Coordinates: 53°26′14″N 17°17′9″E
- Country: Poland
- Voivodeship: Greater Poland
- County: Złotów
- Gmina: Lipka
- Population: 290
- Time zone: UTC+1 (CET)
  - Summer (DST): UTC+2 (CEST)
- Vehicle registration: PZL

Wielki Buczek (Polish pronunciation: [ˈvjɛlkʲi ˈbutʂɛk]) is a village in the administrative district of Gmina Lipka, within Złotów County, Greater Poland Voivodeship, in north-central Poland. It is situated in the ethnocultural region of Krajna in northern Greater Poland.

== History ==
The territory became a part of the emerging Polish state under its first historic ruler Mieszko I in the 10th century. Wielki Buczek was a private village of Polish nobility, including the Wituliński, Potulicki, Raczyński, Grabowski families, administratively located in the Nakło County in the Kalisz Voivodeship in the Greater Poland Province. In 1730, Adam Stanisław Grabowski built the Holy Trinity church. It was annexed by Prussia in the First Partition of Poland in 1772, and from 1871 it was also part of Germany. In 1939, the Germans carried out arrests of prominent local Poles, including activists, a school teacher and the parish priest, who were then deported to the Sachsenhausen and Dachau concentration camps and killed there (see: Nazi crimes against the Polish nation). Following Germany's defeat in World War II, in 1945, the village was restored to Poland.
