= Gmina Krajenka =

Gmina Krajenka Krajenka Commune
- Gmina
- Interactive map of Gmina Krajenka
- Coordinates (Krajenka): 53°18′31″N 16°59′10″E
- Country: Poland
- Voivodeship: Greater Poland
- County: Złotów
- Seat: Krajenka

Area
  - Total: 191.79 km^{2} (74.05 sq mi)

Population (2006)
  - Total: 7,230
  - Density: 37.7/km^{2} (97.6/sq mi)
  - Urban: 3,651
  - Rural: 3,579
- Website: http://www.krajenka.pl/

Gmina Krajenka is an urban-rural gmina (administrative district) in Złotów County, Greater Poland Voivodeship, in west-central Poland. Its seat is the town of Krajenka, which lies approximately 7 kilometres (4 mi) south-west of Złotów and 101 km (63 mi) north of the regional capital Poznań.

The gmina covers an area of 191.79 square kilometres (74.1 sq mi), and as of 2006 its total population is 7,230 (out of which the population of Krajenka amounts to 3,651, and the population of the rural part of the gmina is 3,579).

== Villages ==
Apart from the town of Krajenka, Gmina Krajenka contains the villages and settlements of Augustowo, Barankowo, Czajcze, Dolnik, Głubczyn, Krajenka-Wybudowanie, Leśnik, Łońsko, Maryniec, Paruszka, Podróżna, Pogórze, Rogownica, Skórka, Śmiardowo Krajeńskie, Tarnówczyn, Wąsoszki and Żeleźnica.

== Neighbouring gminas ==
Gmina Krajenka is bordered by the town of Piła and by the gminas of Kaczory, Szydłowo, Tarnówka, Wysoka and Złotów.
