= Czyżkowo =

- Village
- Location within Poland
- Coordinates: 53°27′32″N 17°19′46″E
- Country: Poland
- Voivodeship: Greater Poland
- County: Złotów
- Gmina: Lipka
- Population: 210
- Time zone: UTC+1 (CET)
  - Summer (DST): UTC+2 (CEST)
- Vehicle registration: PZL

Czyżkowo ([t͡ʂɨʂˈkɔvɔ]; German: Ziskau) is a village in the administrative district of Gmina Lipka, within Złotów County, Greater Poland Voivodeship, in north-central Poland. It is located in ethnocultural region of Krajna in northern Greater Poland.

== History ==
The territory became a part of the emerging Polish state under its first historic ruler Mieszko I in the 10th century. Czyżkowo, also known in the past as Szyszkowo, was a private village of Polish nobility, administratively located in the Nakło County in the Kalisz Voivodeship in the Greater Poland Province. It was annexed by Prussia in the First Partition of Poland in 1772, and from 1871 to 1945 it was part of Germany.
