= Nowy Buczek =

- Village
- Location within Poland
- Coordinates: 53°26′54″N 17°16′35″E
- Country: Poland
- Voivodeship: Greater Poland
- County: Złotów
- Gmina: Lipka
- Population: 200

Nowy Buczek ([ˈnɔvɨ ˈbut͡ʂɛk]; German: Neu Butzig) is a village in the administrative district of Gmina Lipka, within Złotów County, Greater Poland Voivodeship, in west-central Poland.

Before 1772 the area was part of Kingdom of Poland, 1772-1945 Prussia and Germany. For more on its history, see Złotów County.
