= Stołuńsko =

- Village
- Location within Poland
- Coordinates: 53°25′46″N 17°15′23″E
- Country: Poland
- Voivodeship: Greater Poland
- County: Złotów
- Gmina: Lipka

Stołuńsko [stɔˈwuɲskɔ] is a village in the administrative district of Gmina Lipka, within Złotów County, Greater Poland Voivodeship, in west-central Poland.

Before 1772 the area was part of Kingdom of Poland, 1772-1945 Prussia and Germany. For more on its history, see Złotów County.
