= Krajenka =

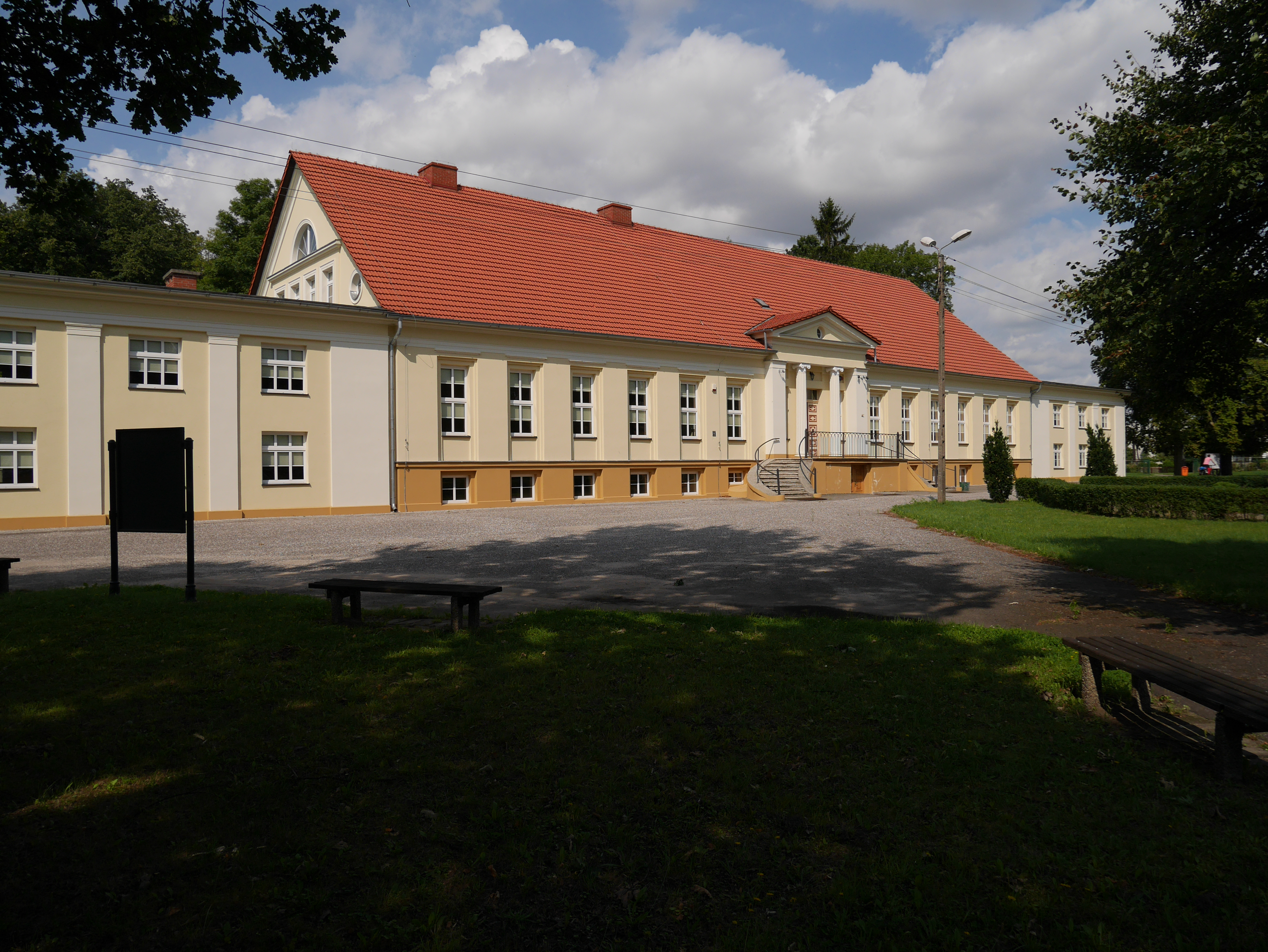
- Sułkowski Palace in Krajenka

- Coat of arms

- Location within Poland
- Coordinates: 53°18′31″N 16°59′10″E
- Country: Poland
- Voivodeship: Greater Poland
- County: Złotów
- Gmina: Krajenka
- First mentioned: 1286
- Town rights: 1420

Area
  - Total: 3.77 km^{2} (1.46 sq mi)

Population (2006)
  - Total: 3,651
  - Density: 968/km^{2} (2,510/sq mi)
- Time zone: UTC+1 (CET)
  - Summer (DST): UTC+2 (CEST)
- Postal code: 77-430
- Website: http://www.krajenka.pl

Krajenka [kraˈjɛŋka] (German: Krojanke) is a town in the Greater Poland Voivodeship of Poland. It has 3,804 inhabitants (2005) and lies in Złotów County.

== Geographical location ==
Krajenka is located approximately 15 kilometers south of Złotów, 50 kilometers south-east of Szczecinek and 160 kilometers east of the regional center, Szczecin. It is located on the Głomia river, a tributary of the Gwda river. It is part of the ethnographic region of Krajna, located in the northern part of the historic Greater Poland region.

== History ==
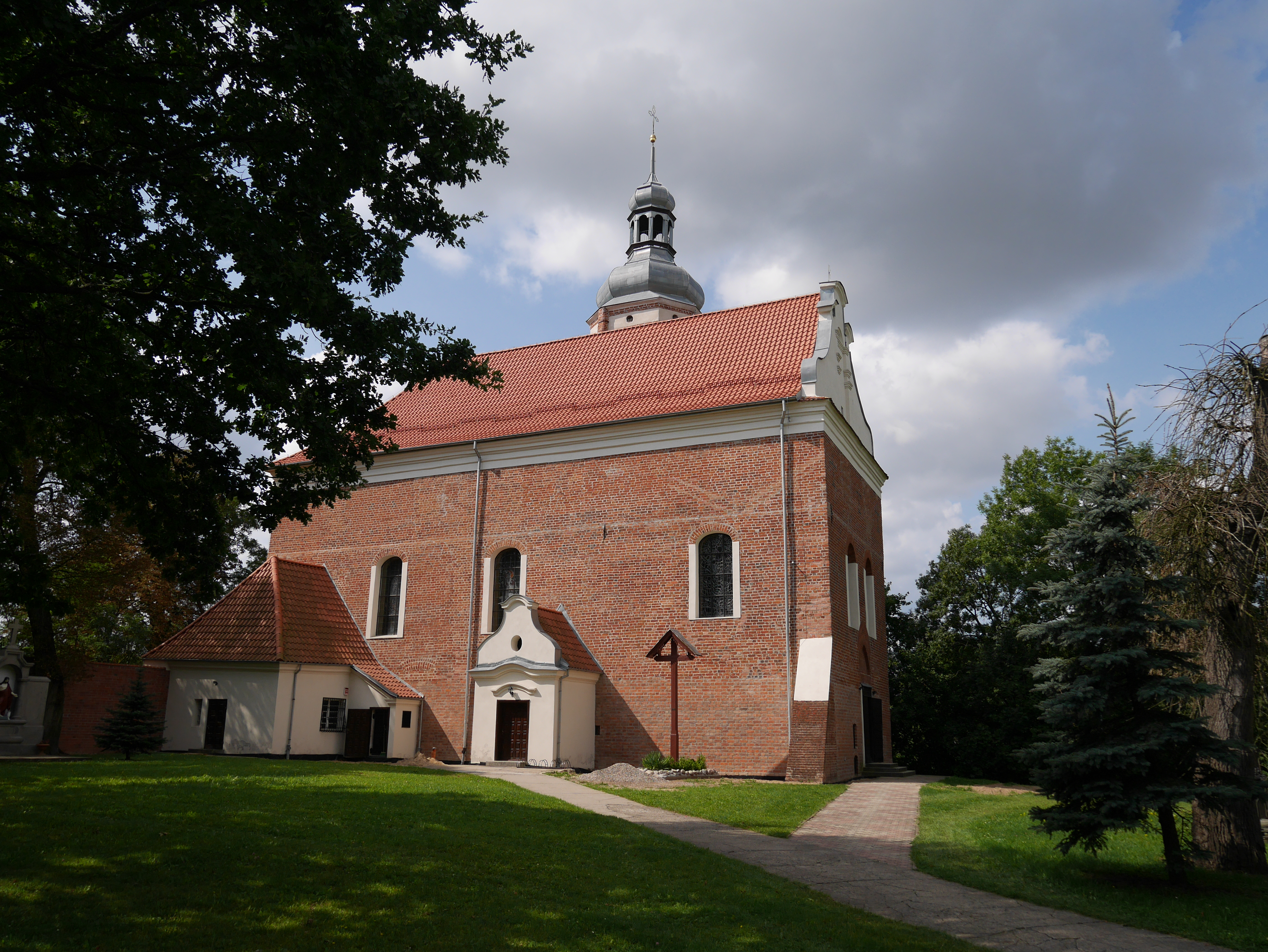
Saint Anne church

The first mention of the town is from 1286, back then it belonged to noble family of Danaborski whose Coat of Arms was Toporczyk. The name of the town itself comes from the Polish word Krajna, which meant in the past a location on the borders of Polish state. Throughout centuries it was connected to Polish royalty and such families as Danaborski, Dahlke, Kościelecki, Grudziński, Działyński, Sułkowski, Komierowski.

Magdeburg town rights were granted in 1420 by the Polish king Władysław II Jagiełło.

Following the First Partition of Poland, in 1772 it was annexed by Prussia. In 1787 the town suffered a fire. After the last Polish owner of the town Jakub Komierowski was killed by the Prussians in 1807, the town was confiscated by Prussian officials and passed from Polish to German hands. In 1846 a Protestant church was built by the famous German architect Carl Friedrich Schinkel. In 1871 a railway station of the Prussian Eastern Railway was built south of the Głomia river. The town was then the property of Prince Friedrich Leopold of Prussia. According to the German census of 1890, the town had a population of 3,344, of which 400 (12%) were Poles.

Despite the policy of Germanisation, local Poles in the early 20th century founded the People's Bank and a Polish Catholic Society. After Poland regained independence in 1918, the Polish inhabitants made efforts to reintegrate the town with Poland, but despite their requests and protests, the Treaty of Versailles granted the town to Germany. Then it was made part of the province of Grenzmark Posen-Westpreußen. On 21 June 1924, the town made history within German law as the Reichsgericht confirmed private ownership by Prinz Friedrich Leopold, including, where he died in 1931. In 1931, local Poles founded a Polish school. Its teacher, Franciszek Gliszewski, was arrested and murdered by the Germans in the Flossenbürg concentration camp after the outbreak of World War II in 1939.

On 30 January 1945 the Soviet Red Army occupied the abandoned and severely destroyed town during the final stages of World War II. Many of the inhabitants had fled during the winter of 1944/1945. After the war the town was finally reintegrated with Poland under the Potsdam Agreement.

=== Number of inhabitants by year ===
Historical population

Year	Pop.	±%
1772	900	—
1783	848	−5.8%
1805	1,946	+129.5%
1831	2,035	+4.6%
1853	3,063	+50.5%

Year	Pop.	±%
1857	2,061	−32.7%
1875	3,303	+60.3%
1880	3,531	+6.9%
1890	3,344	−5.3%
1925	3,354	+0.3%

Year	Pop.	±%
1933	3,345	−0.3%
1939	3,233	−3.3%
1945	150	−95.4%
1960	3,100	+1966.7%
2006	3,651	+17.8%

Note that the table is based on primary, possibly inaccurate or biased sources.

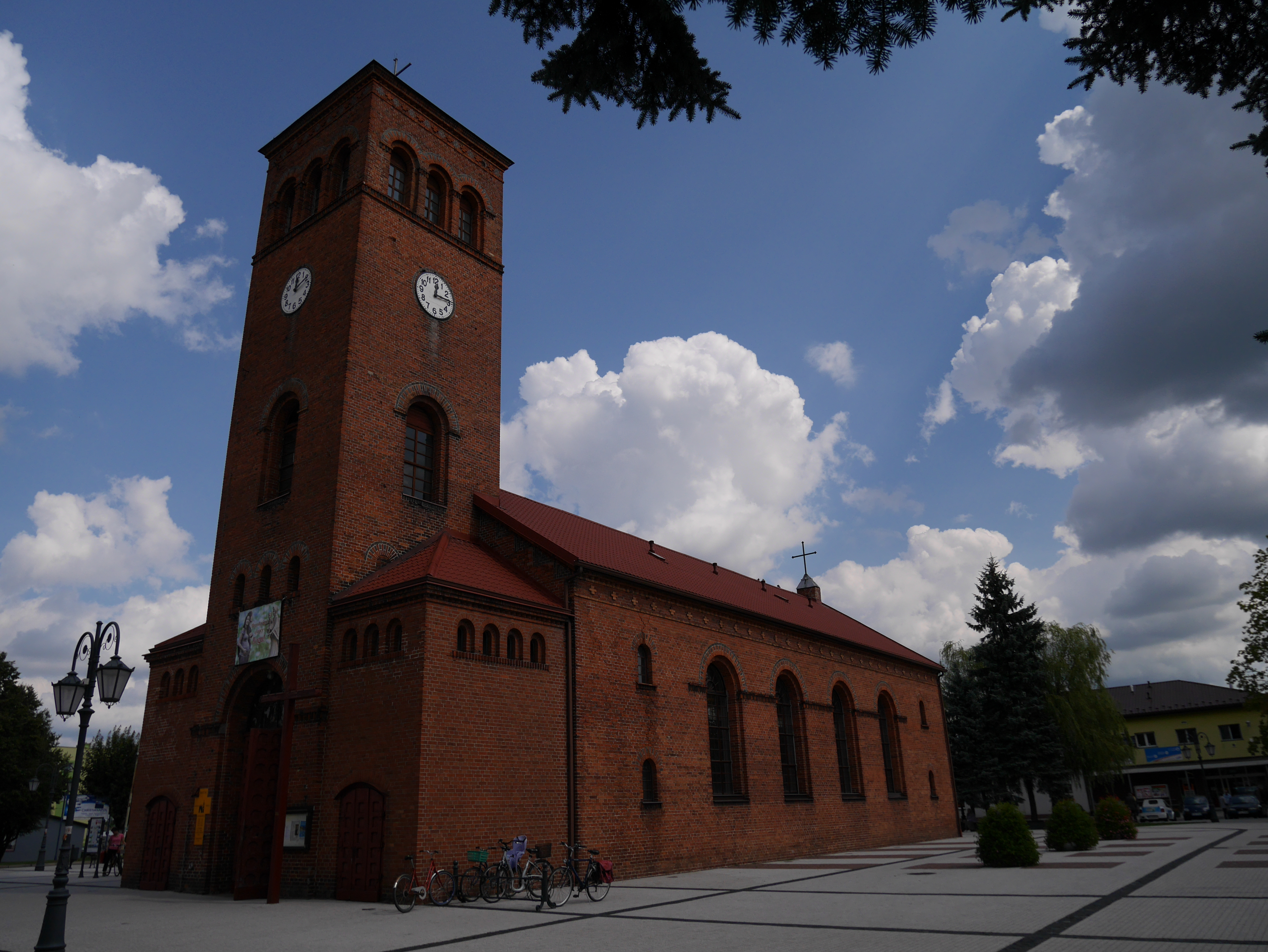
Saint Joseph church

== Notable people ==
- Antoni Januszewski (1914-1939), Polish Catholic priest, murdered by the Germans during World War II
- Siggi Wilzig (1926-2003), Auschwitz Holocaust survivor, CEO of Wilshire Oil Company
