= Łąkie, Złotów County =

Łąkie
- Village
- Location within Poland
- Coordinates: 53°30′8″N 17°7′22″E
- Country: Poland
- Voivodeship: Greater Poland
- County: Złotów
- Gmina: Lipka
- Population: 520
- Time zone: UTC+1 (CET)
  - Summer (DST): UTC+2 (CEST)
- Vehicle registration: PZL

Łąkie [ˈwɔnkʲɛ] (German: Lanken) is a village in the administrative district of Gmina Lipka, within Złotów County, Greater Poland Voivodeship, in north-central Poland. It is situated on the southern shore of Lake Łąkie in the ethnocultural region of Krajna in the historic region of Greater Poland.

== History ==
The territory became a part of the emerging Polish state under its first historic ruler Mieszko I in the 10th century. Łąkie was a private village of Polish nobility, including the Potulicki, Grudziński and Działyński families, administratively located in the Nakło County in the Kalisz Voivodeship in the Greater Poland Province. It was annexed by Prussia in the First Partition of Poland in 1772, and from 1871 to 1945 it was part of Germany.
