= Smolnica, Złotów County =

Smolnica
- Village
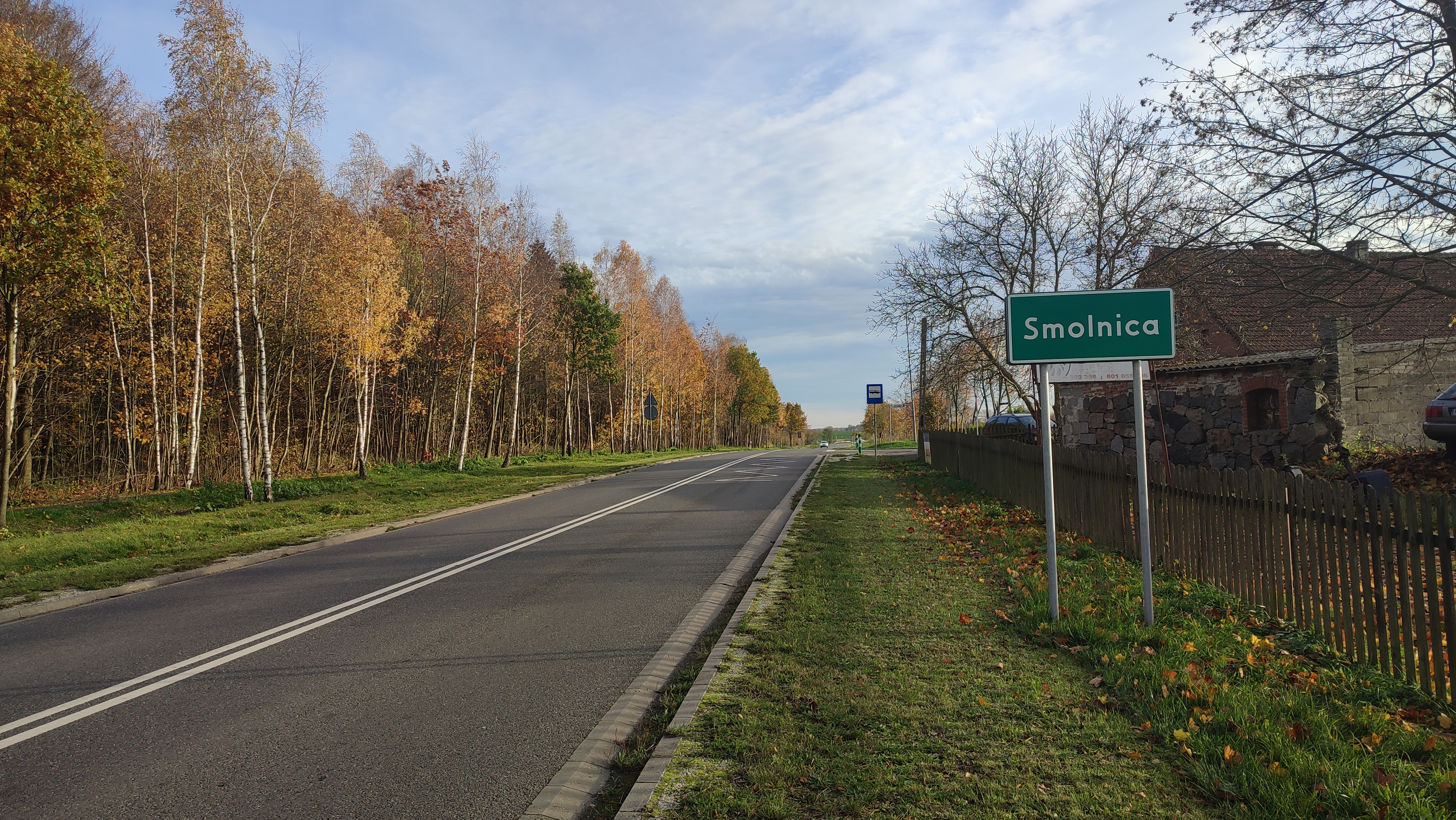
- DW 188 running through Smolnica

- Location within Poland
- Coordinates: 53°30′23″N 17°13′12″E
- Country: Poland
- Voivodeship: Greater Poland
- County: Złotów
- Gmina: Lipka
- Population: 120

Smolnica [smɔlˈnit͡sa] is a village in the administrative district of Gmina Lipka, within Złotów County, Greater Poland Voivodeship, in west-central Poland.

Before 1772 the area was part of Kingdom of Poland, 1772-1945 Prussia and Germany. For more on its history, see Złotów County.
