= Wąsoszki =

- Village
- Location within Poland
- Coordinates: 53°19′N 17°0′E
- Country: Poland
- Voivodeship: Greater Poland
- County: Złotów
- Gmina: Krajenka
- Population: 80

Wąsoszki [vɔ̃ˈsɔʂki] is a village in the administrative district of Gmina Krajenka, within Złotów County, Greater Poland Voivodeship, in west-central Poland.

Before 1772 the area was part of Kingdom of Poland, 1772-1945 Prussia and Germany. For more on its history, see Złotów County.
