= Batorówko =

- Village
- Location within Poland
- Coordinates: 53°28′38″N 17°17′59″E
- Country: Poland
- Voivodeship: Greater Poland
- County: Złotów
- Gmina: Lipka
- Population: 210

Batorówko ([batɔˈrufkɔ]; German: Neu Battrow) is a village in the administrative district of Gmina Lipka, within Złotów County, Greater Poland Voivodeship, in west-central Poland.

Before 1772 the area was part of the Kingdom of Poland, and from 1772 to 1945 part of Prussia and Germany. For more on its history, see Złotów County.
