= Podróżna =

- Village
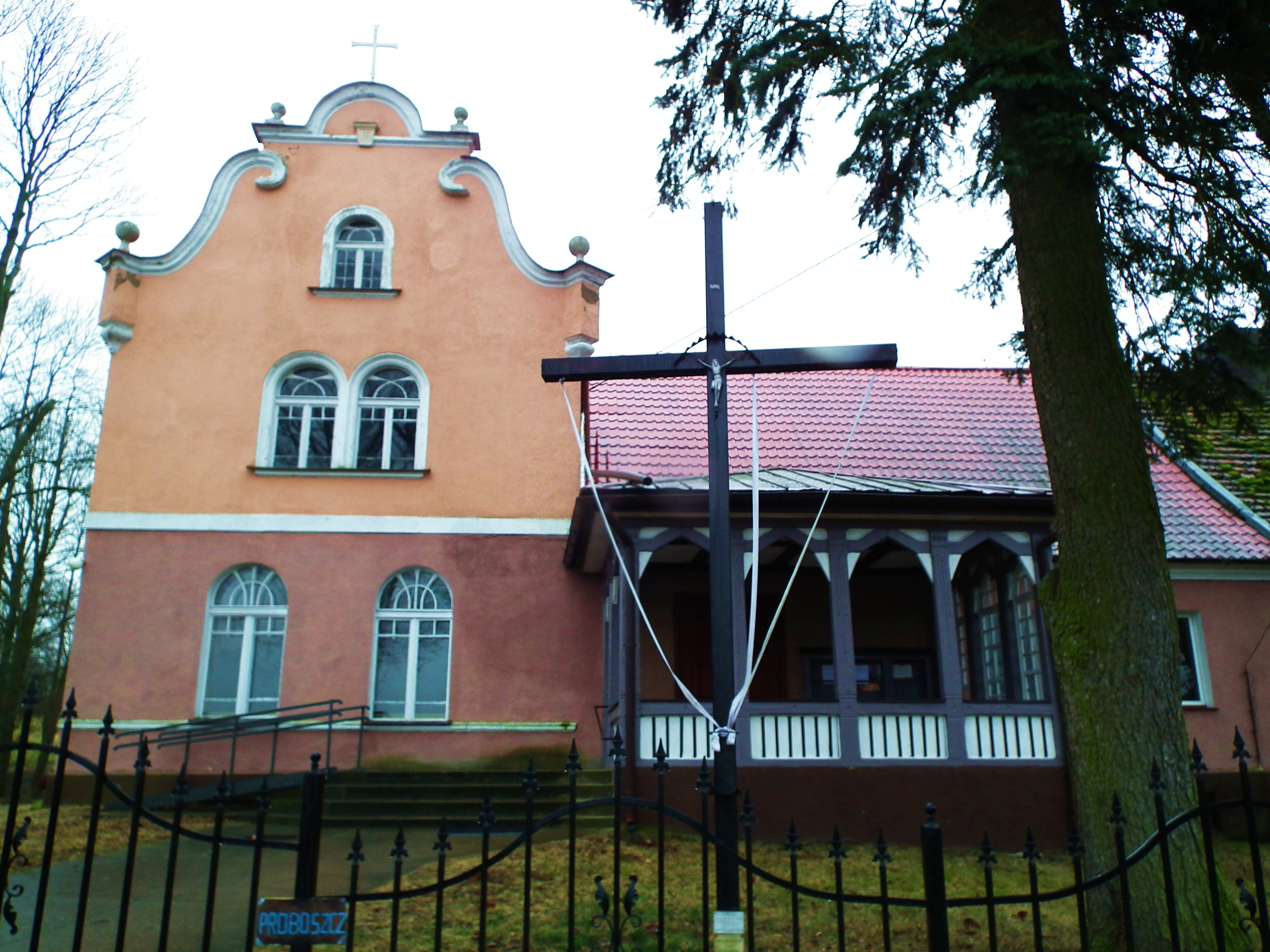
- Saint Michael Archangel chapel

- Location within Poland
- Coordinates: 53°15′N 17°3′E
- Country: Poland
- Voivodeship: Greater Poland
- County: Złotów
- Gmina: Krajenka
- Population: 470
- Time zone: UTC+1 (CET)
  - Summer (DST): UTC+2 (CEST)
- Vehicle registration: PZL

Podróżna [pɔˈdruʐna] is a village in the administrative district of Gmina Krajenka, within Złotów County, Greater Poland Voivodeship, in north-central Poland.

== History ==
The territory became a part of the emerging Polish state under its first historic ruler Mieszko I in the 10th century. Podróżna was a private village of Polish nobility, administratively located in the Nakło County in the Kalisz Voivodeship in the Greater Poland Province of the Kingdom of Poland. It was annexed by Prussia in the First Partition of Poland in 1772, and from 1871 it was also part of Germany. In 1868, it had a population of 465. In 1927, the German government renamed it to Preußenfeld in attempt to erase traces of Polish origin. In 1939, German persecution of Poles intensified, and the local Polish teacher was arrested and then deported to concentration camps. After Germany's defeat in World War II, in 1945, the village became again part of Poland and its historic name was restored.
