= Potulice, Złotów County =

Potulice
- Village
- Location within Poland
- Coordinates: 53°27′53″N 17°10′15″E
- Country: Poland
- Voivodeship: Greater Poland
- County: Złotów
- Gmina: Lipka
- Population: 100
- Time zone: UTC+1 (CET)
  - Summer (DST): UTC+2 (CEST)
- Vehicle registration: PZL

Potulice ([pɔtuˈlit͡sɛ]; German: Pottlitz) is a village in the administrative district of Gmina Lipka, within Złotów County, Greater Poland Voivodeship, in north-central Poland.

== History ==
The territory became a part of the emerging Polish state under its first historic ruler Mieszko I in the 10th century. Potulice was a private village of Polish nobility, administratively located in the Nakło County in the Kalisz Voivodeship in the Greater Poland Province. It was annexed by Prussia in the First Partition of Poland in 1772, and from 1871 to 1945 it was also part of Germany. During World War II, the Germans operated a forced labour subcamp of the Stalag II-B prisoner-of-war camp for Allied POWs in the village.
