= Krajenka-Wybudowanie =

- Village
- Location within Poland
- Coordinates: 53°17′53″N 16°58′45″E
- Country: Poland
- Voivodeship: Greater Poland
- County: Złotów
- Gmina: Krajenka

Krajenka-Wybudowanie [kraˈjɛnka vɨbudɔˈvaɲɛ] is a village in the administrative district of Gmina Krajenka, within Złotów County, Greater Poland Voivodeship, in west-central Poland.

Before 1772 the area was part of Kingdom of Poland, 1772-1945 Prussia and Germany. For more on its history, see Złotów County.
