= Kościelecki =

The Kościelecki (or, plural, Kościeleccy) - were a noble family which was part of the political and economic elite in Kujawy and Royal Prussia in the fifteenth and sixteenth centuries. They used the Ogończyk coat of arms.

The Kościeleccy came from Dobrzyń Land, from the regions around Skępe but signed themselves as "of Kościelca, near Inowrocław" where another branch of the family resided.

Members of the family were voivodes of Inowrocław, Brześć Kujawski, Poznań, Kalisz, starostas of Kujawy, Pomorze, and Wielkopolska, as well as bishops of Chełm. After the Thirteen Years' War many of them also served at the court of King of Poland which allowed them to amass considerable land and wealth.
