= Augustowo, Złotów County =

Augustowo
- Village
- Location within Poland
- Coordinates: 53°15′N 16°59′E
- Country: Poland
- Voivodeship: Greater Poland
- County: Złotów
- Gmina: Krajenka
- Population: 160

Augustowo [auɡusˈtɔvɔ] is a village in the administrative district of Gmina Krajenka, within Złotów County, Greater Poland Voivodeship, in west-central Poland.

Before 1772 the area was part of Kingdom of Poland, 1772-1945 Prussia and Germany. For more on its history, see Złotów County.
