= Skórka, Greater Poland Voivodeship =

Skórka
- Village
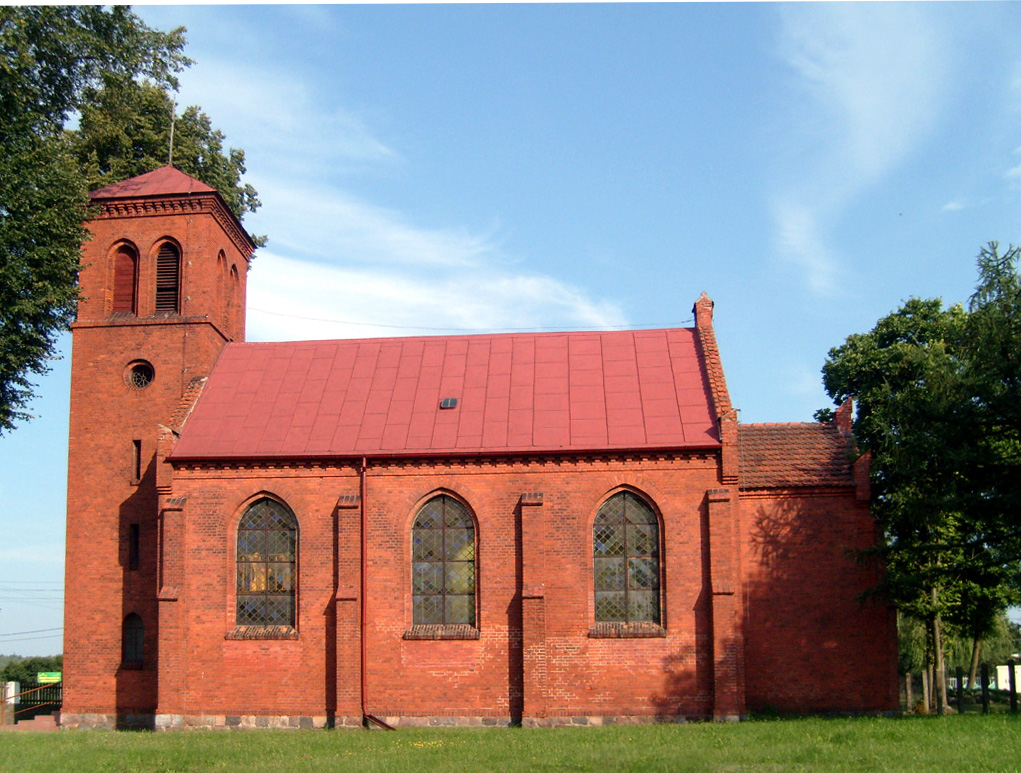
- Church in Skórka

- Location within Poland
- Coordinates: 53°13′23″N 16°52′23″E
- Country: Poland
- Voivodeship: Greater Poland
- County: Złotów
- Gmina: Krajenka
- Population (2005): 530
- Postal code: 64-917
- Area code: +48 067
- Car plates: PZL

Skórka [ˈskurka] (German: Schönfeld) is a village in the administrative district of Gmina Krajenka, within Złotów County, Greater Poland Voivodeship, in west-central Poland.

Before 1772 the area was part of Kingdom of Poland, 1772-1945 Prussia and Germany. For more on its history, see Złotów County. Between 1919 and 1939 it was close to the Polish–German border.
