= Złotów =

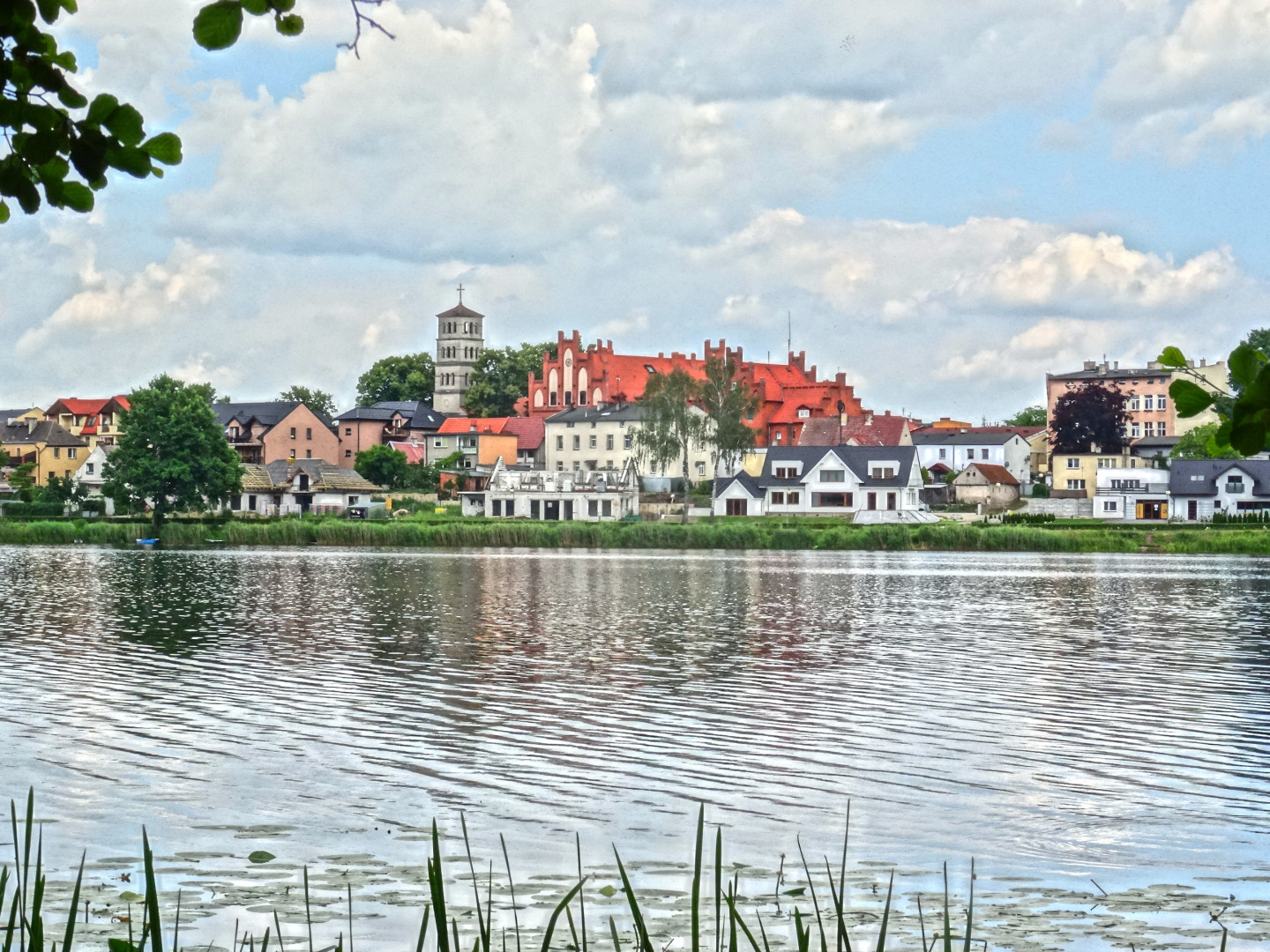
- Skyline of Złotów from the Złotowskie Lake

- Flag Coat of arms

- Location within Poland
- Coordinates: 53°21′37″N 17°2′27″E
- Country: Poland
- Voivodeship: Greater Poland
- County: Złotów
- Gmina: Złotów (urban gmina)
- Established: 8th century
- Town rights: before 1370

Government
  - Mayor: Jakub Pieniążkowski

Area
  - Total: 11.58 km^{2} (4.47 sq mi)
- Elevation: 110 m (360 ft)

Population (2011)
  - Total: 18,303
  - Density: 1,581/km^{2} (4,094/sq mi)
- Time zone: UTC+1 (CET)
  - Summer (DST): UTC+2 (CEST)
- Postal code: 77-400
- Area code: +48 067
- Car plates: PZL
- Climate: Dfb
- Website: http://www.zlotow.pl

Złotów (Polish pronunciation: [ˈzwɔtuf], German: Flatow) is a town in northwestern Poland, with a population of 18,303 inhabitants (2011), seat of the Złotów County in the Greater Poland Voivodeship.

The town is located on the river Głomia and is surrounded by five lakes. It is part of the historic Greater Poland region. A railway line connects it to Piła and Chojnice, with buses operating locally. The local Metaplast windows fitting factory is the biggest industrial employer. The Euro Eco Meeting is organized regularly there each July.

== History ==
Złotów is the historical centre of the northern part of Krajna. Human activity in the region goes as far back as the 8th century BC. Around 700 AD, a hill fort on the shore of the Baba lake was the residence of a Pomeranian tribal chief. The land belonged to the dukes of Gdańsk Pomerania from the house of the Samborides within partitioned Poland and after the last duke Mestwin II died in 1294 it passed under direct rule of the Piast dynasty. In the early 14th century it was occupied by the Teutonic Knights. Złotów was mentioned in 1370 in the chronicle of Jan of Czarnków. In 1370, Złotów was granted Magdeburg rights while under Polish rule. According to the last will of Polish king Casimir III the Great after his death in 1370 his grandson, Casimir IV, Duke of Pomerania, was to inherit the lands of Dobrzyń, Bydgoszcz, Kruszwica, Złotów and Wałcz as fiefs.

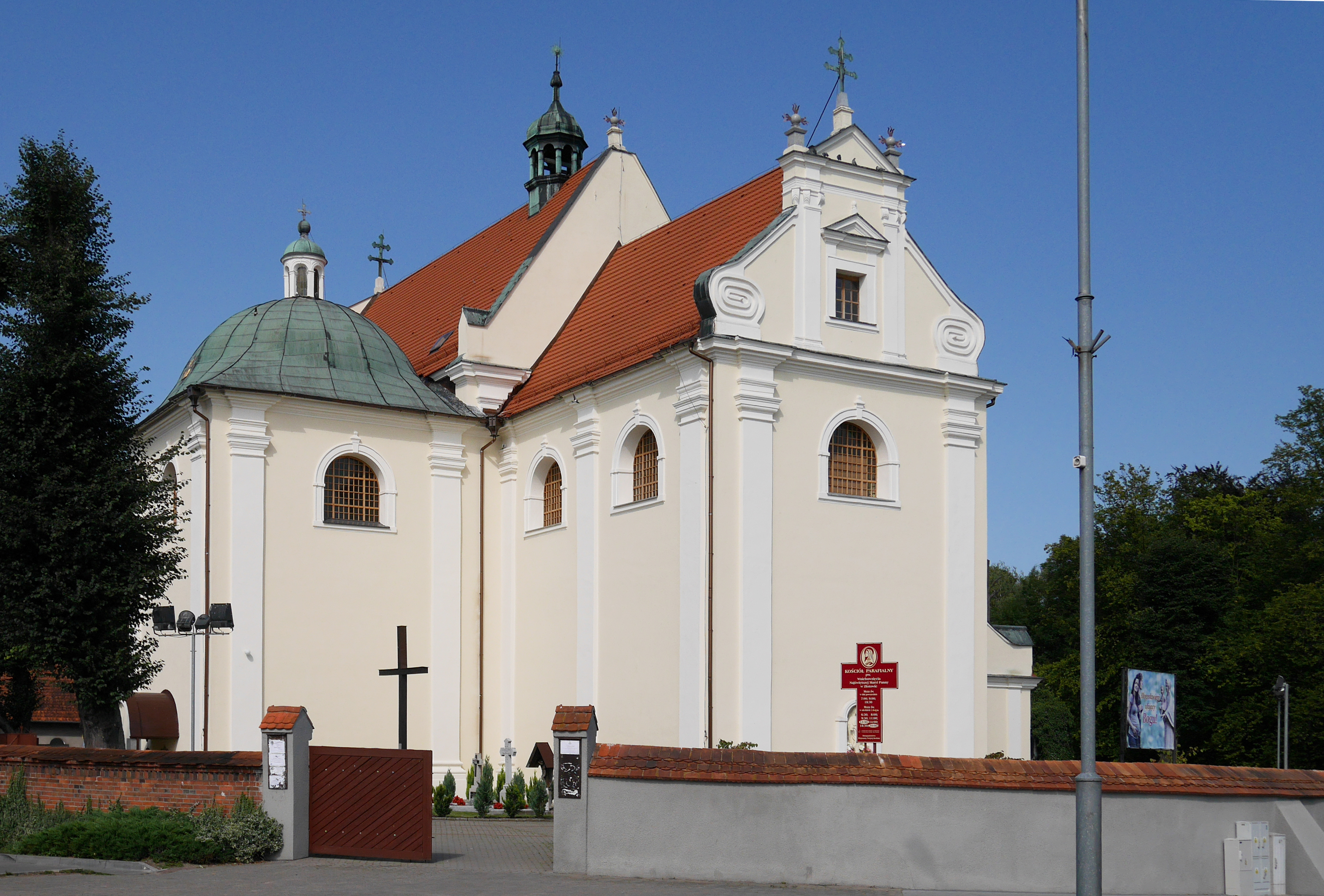
Baroque Church of the Assumption

Złotów was destroyed by the Teutonic Knights in 1455 during the Thirteen Years' War. The town later belonged to the Potulicki family which provided it with a new Gothic castle in Renaissance style at the beginning of the 17th century. In 1619, Jan Potulicki issued a founding document for the church and parish of the Holy Assumption of Mary. Later it passed to the Grudziński family. In 1665 the town still had Magdeburg rights. The castle was destroyed during the Swedish invasion in 1657. The bombardment also destroyed other parts of the city including the town hall. A new church, still standing today, was founded there in 1664 by Andrzej Karol Grudziński. After the rule of the Grudziński family came to an end in 1688, the Działyński family came into power.

From 1709 to 1711, a plague beset the area. According to incomplete church records, approximately 1,650 people died as a result of the epidemic. After the First Partition of Poland in 1772, Złotów was incorporated into Prussia. In 1784 a Protestant half-timbered church was built on the great market square, which during the time span 1829–31 was replaced by a modern church designed by Karl Friedrich Schinkel.

From 1772 to 1945, as part of Prussia and later Germany it was known as Flatow. The town was given county (Kreis) town status in 1818. It was part of the Flatow district in the Prussian Province of West Prussia. In 1871, a railway line from Piła (then Schneidemühl) was completed. Around this time many local people emigrated to America, including many members of the local Polish community. Despite the Germanisation policy of the Prussian authorities, local Poles founded several organizations, including the People's Bank (Bank Ludowy), the Cecylia choir, which is one of the oldest still existing choirs of Greater Poland and an agricultural and trade cooperative, all three of these entities operate to this day. According to the 1910 census, the population of the town was 4,282, of whom 3,190 (74%) reported German as their sole mother tongue, while 917 (21%) reported Polish; the Jewish population was 203 (4.7%).

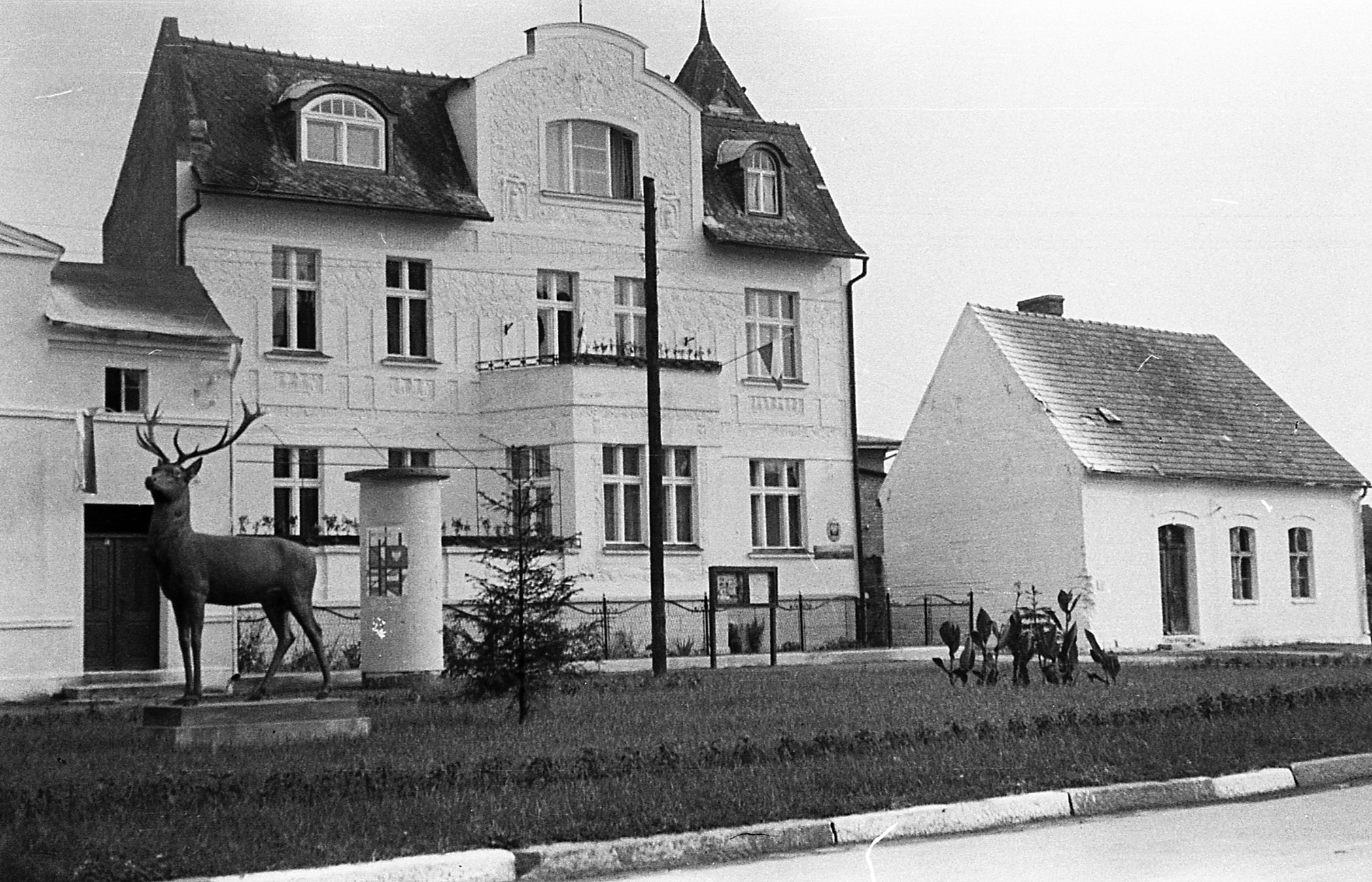
Interwar headquarters of various Polish organizations

In 1918, local residents disarmed stationed German troops. In 1919, it was decided that the eastern part of the Flatow district would be ceded to Poland and the western part of the district, including the town of Flatow would remain in Germany. This caused protests from the large Polish minority of the town and the surrounding rural lands, where Polish-speakers comprised between 20-25% of the population. From 1922 until 1938, Flatow was part of the newly formed Province of Grenzmark Posen-West Prussia inside Germany. When this province was dissolved on 1 October 1938, Flatow was integrated into the Province of Pomerania. Despite this, the town became the seat of local branches of the Union of Poles in Germany and the Polish-Catholic School Society. Local Poles managed to establish a Polish school, preschool, library and the Sparta Złotów football club (multi-section club after the war). Polish press was still issued in the town. The Polish school was devastated by the Germans in the 1930s, and the local synagogue was destroyed during the Kristallnacht in 1938. In 1939, shortly before the invasion of Poland, local Polish activists and teachers were arrested and later imprisoned in Nazi concentration camps. During World War II, the Polish resistance conducted espionage of German activity in the town. In the last months of the war, the town was captured by Polish troops in the Battle of Złotów on 31 January 1945 and was finally reintegrated with Poland.

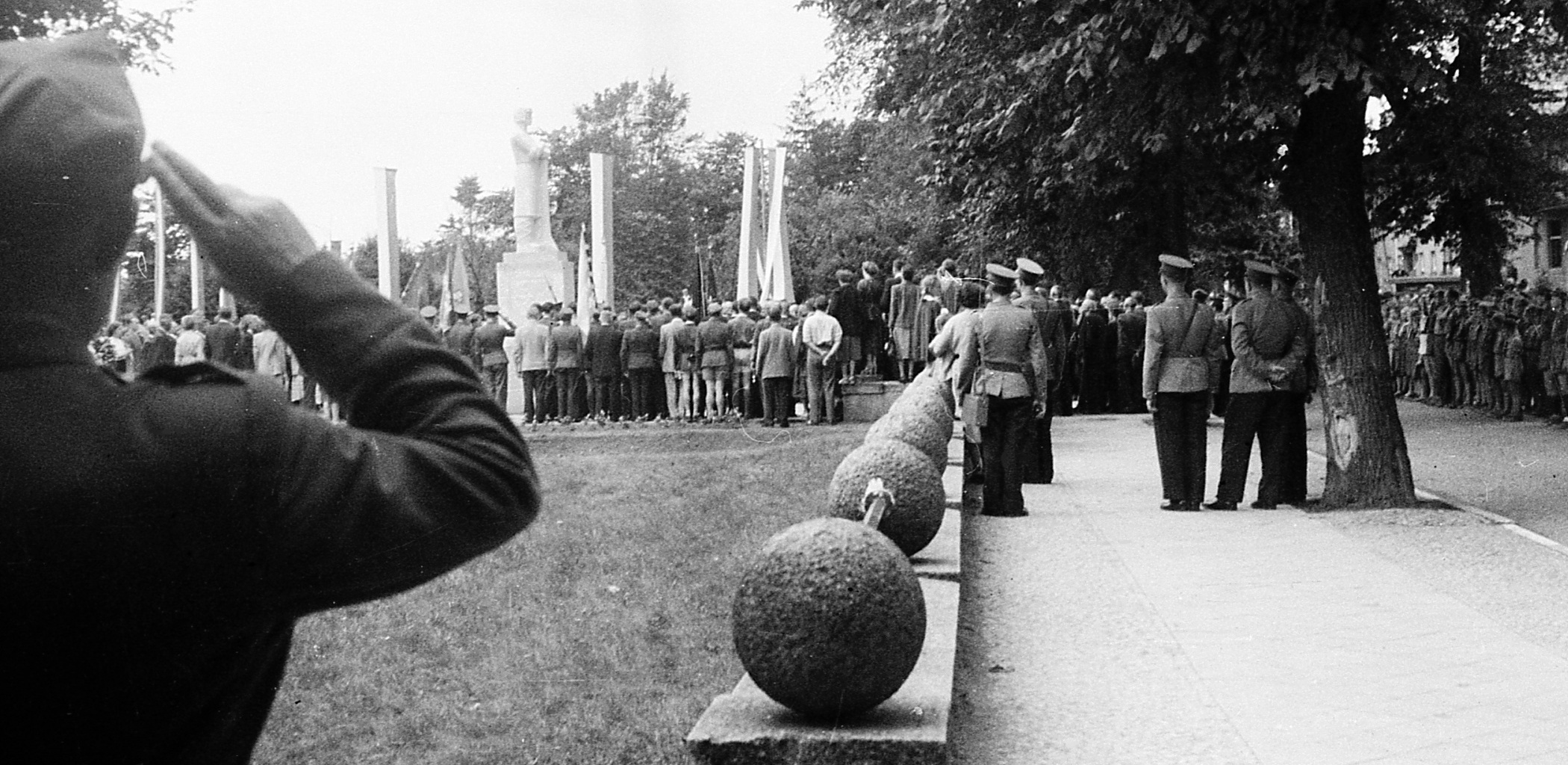
Unveiling ceremony of the Piast the Wheelwright monument in 1957

After World War II, the redrawn borders forced upon Germany and Poland by the Soviet Union in the Potsdam Agreement placed the town, once again, inside Poland. Its first post-war mayor was Jan Kocik, leading pre-war Polish activist in Złotów, who was imprisoned by the Germans in the Sachsenhausen concentration camp during the war. Already in 1945, new Polish schools were founded, and both the Sparta Złotów sports club and the "Cecylia" choir resumed their activities. The Culture Center was established in 1946 and the Municipal Library in 1947. A local branch of the Freedom and Independence Association was based in Złotów. In 1957, the only monument in Poland to Piast the Wheelwright, the semi-legendary founder of the Piast dynasty, was unveiled in Złotów. In 1961 the Regional Museum was established. From 1975 to 1998, it was administratively located in the Piła Voivodeship.

== Demographics ==
Architecture of Złotów (examples)

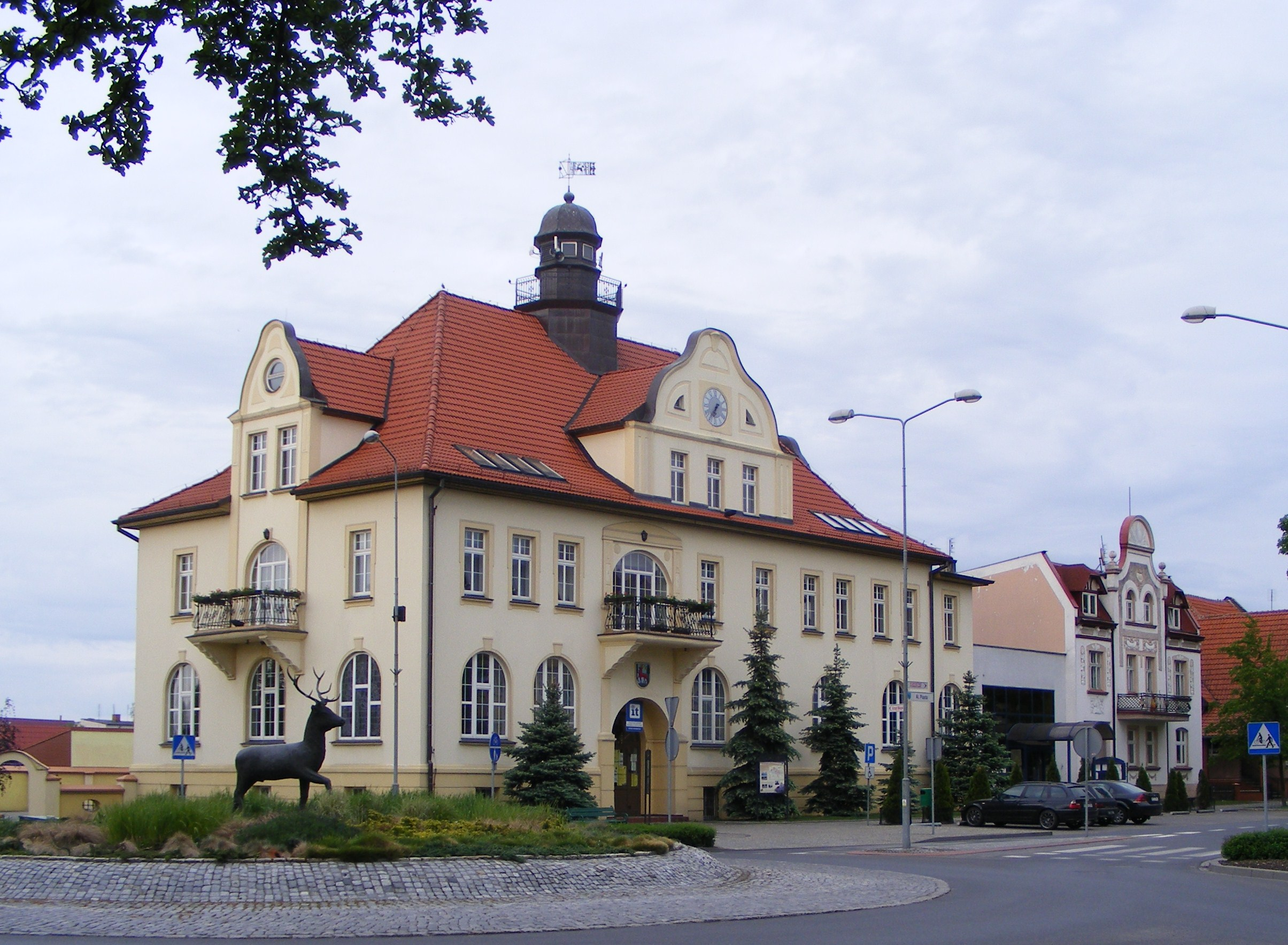
Town Hall

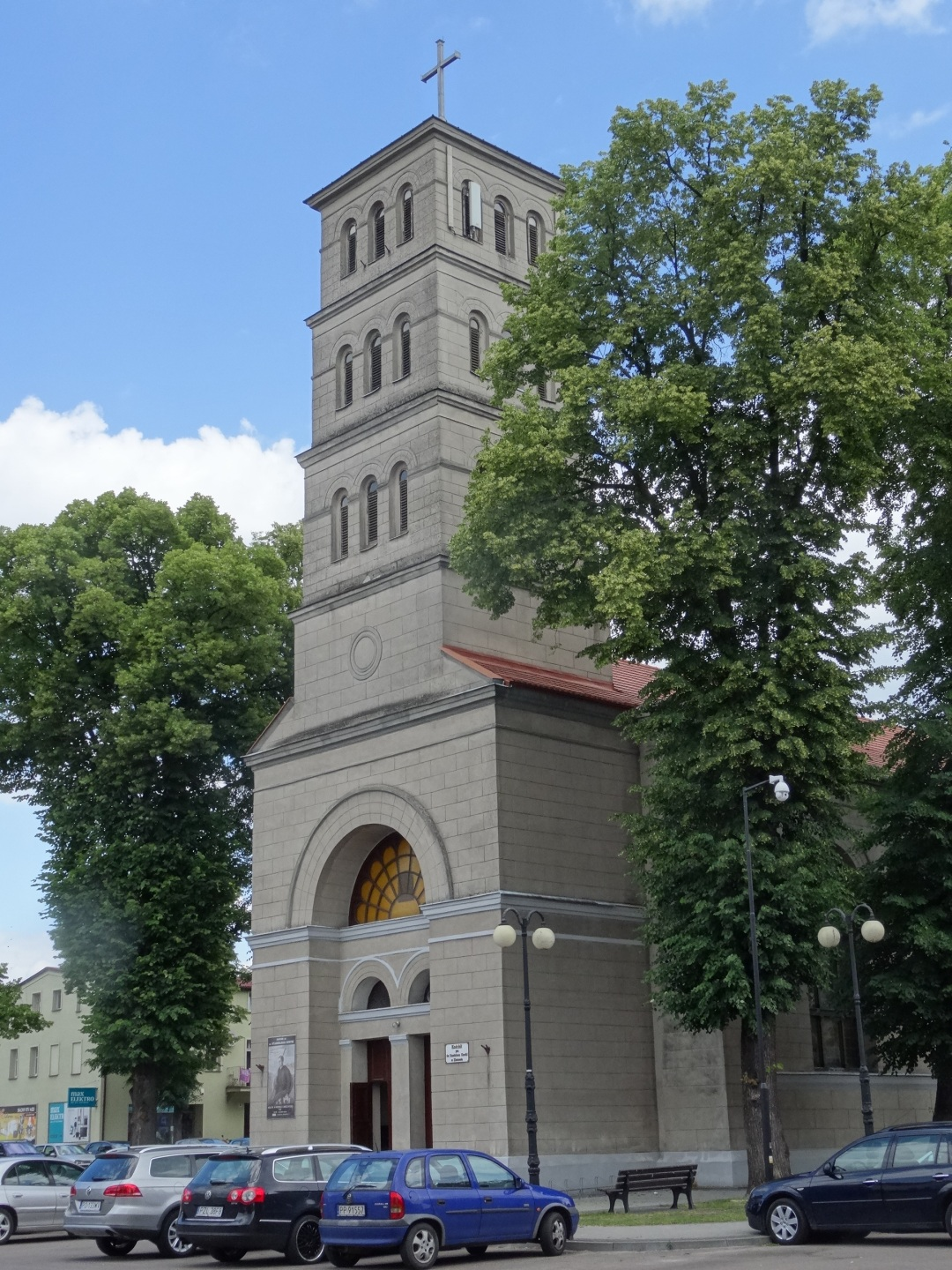
Saint Stanislaus Kostka church

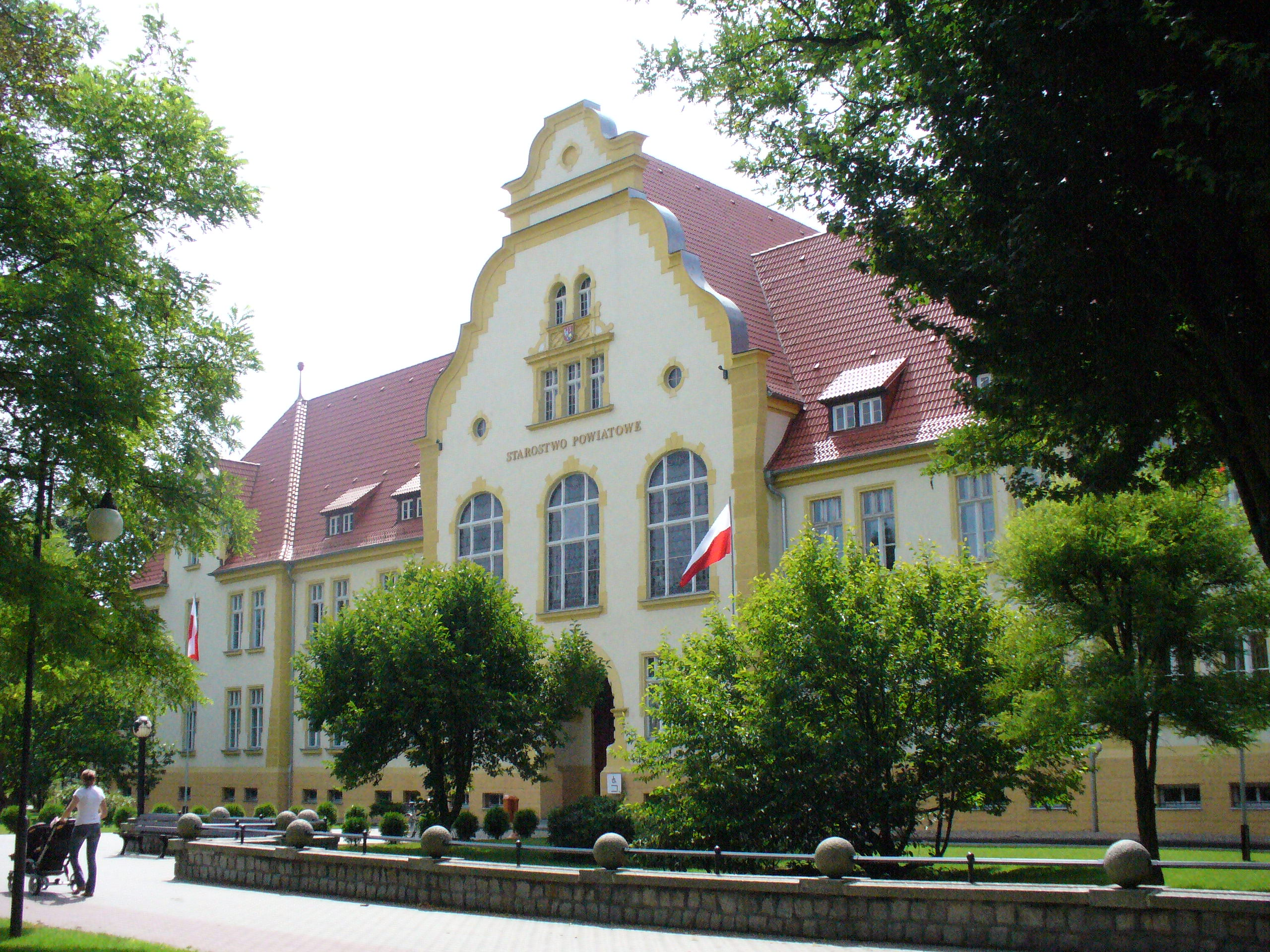
Złotów County Office

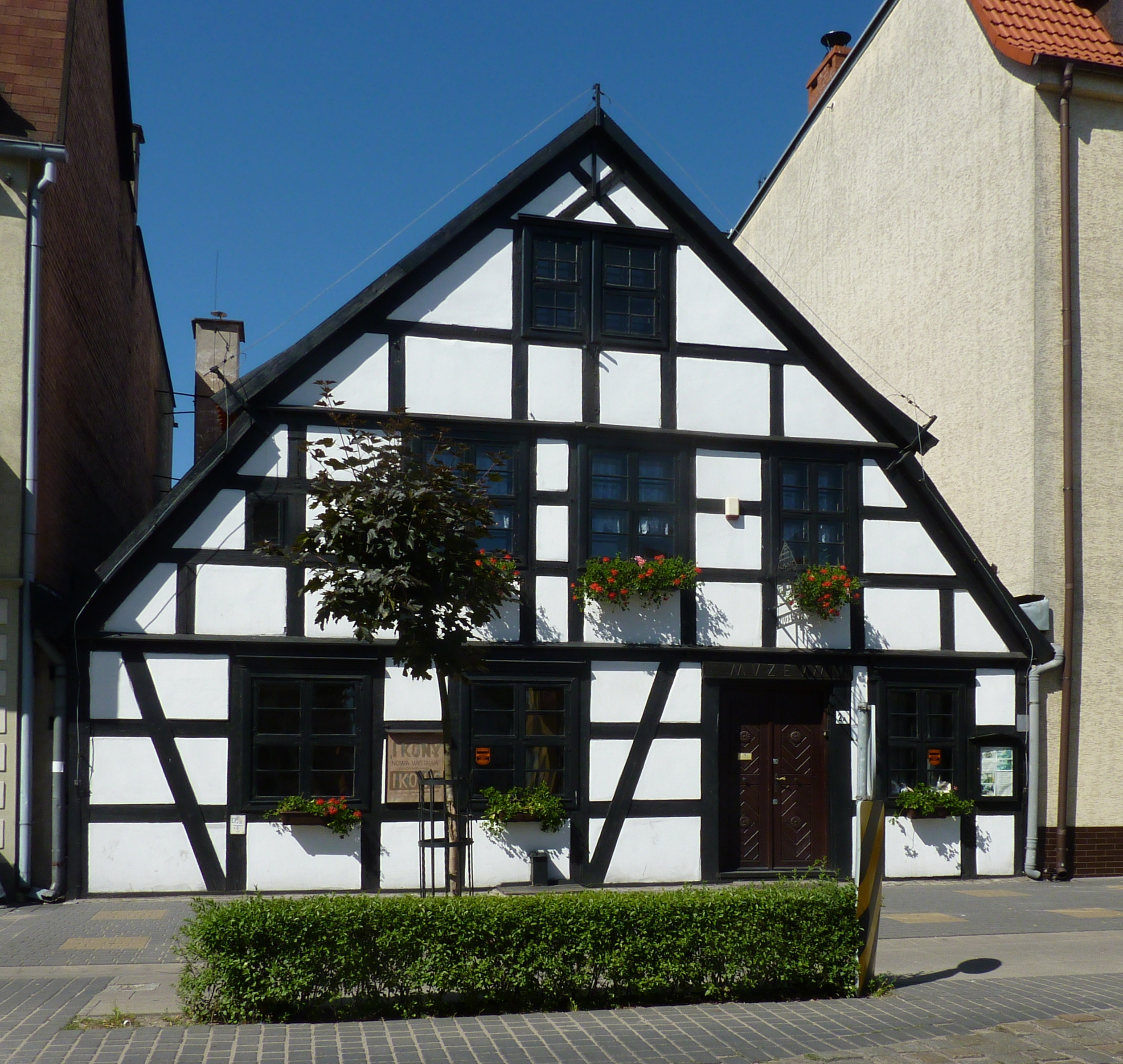
Złotów Museum, located in a historical timber framed house

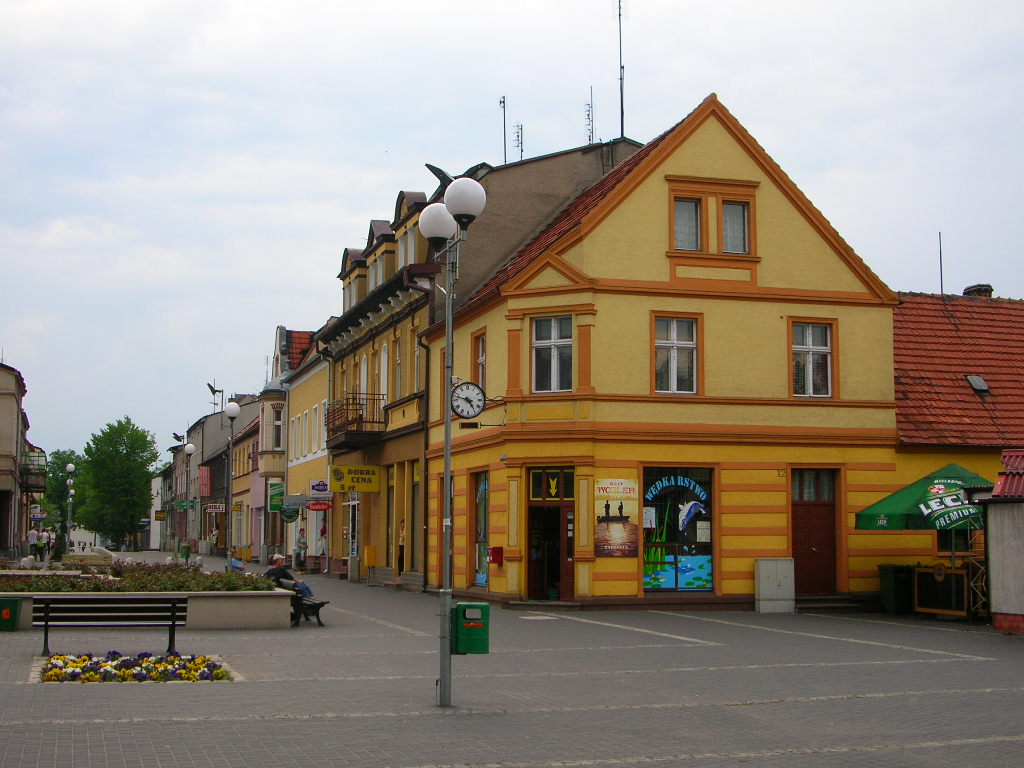
Paderewskiego Square

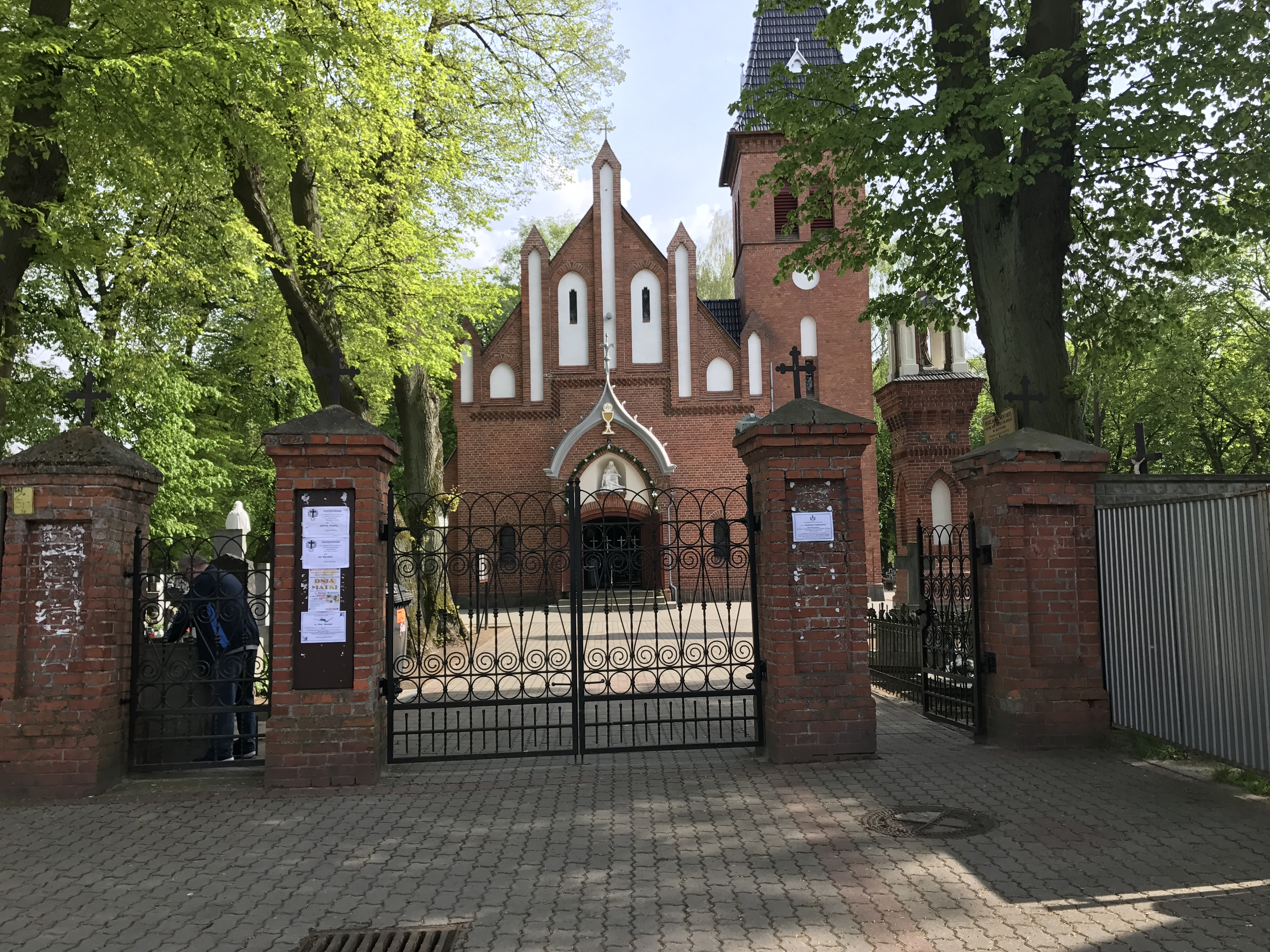
Saint Roch church

Historical population

Year	Pop.	±%
1783	1,597	—
1805	1,764	+10.5%
1831	1,960	+11.1%
1843	2,312	+18.0%
1849	2,841	+22.9%
1853	2,772	−2.4%
1864	3,172	+14.4%
1871	3,311	+4.4%
1875	3,510	+6.0%
1880	3,921	+11.7%

Year	Pop.	±%
1890	3,852	−1.8%
1900	4,018	+4.3%
1910	4,282	+6.6%
1925	5,939	+38.7%
1933	7,112	+19.8%
1939	7,496	+5.4%
1950	6,725	−10.3%
1960	8,979	+33.5%
2010	18,303	+103.8%

== Notable residents ==
- Agnieszka Bednarek-Kasza (born 1986), Polish volleyball player
- Paweł Buzała (born 1985), Polish football player
- Wojciech Golla (born 1992), Polish football player
- Walter Krueger (1881–1967), a United States army general
- Eberhard Schöler (born 1940), German table tennis competitor

== Sport ==
The local women's volleyball team, Sparta Złotów, plays in the third national league.

== International relations ==
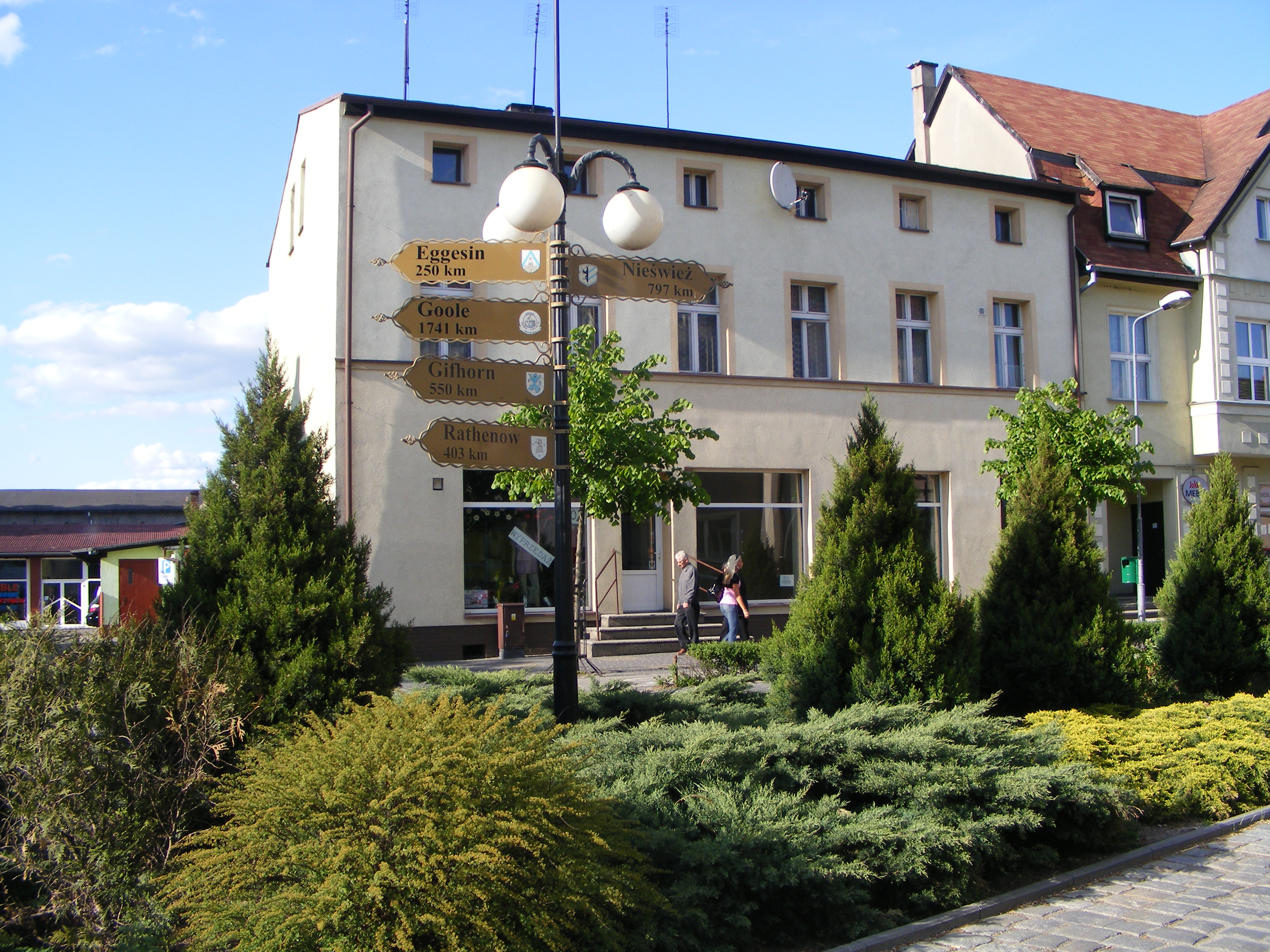
Twin towns of Złotów on a signpost in the town center

=== Twin towns — Sister cities ===
Złotów is twinned with:

- Rathenow, Germany
- Eggesin, Germany
- Gifhorn, Germany

There has also been some cooperation with:

- Goole, United Kingdom
- Nieśwież, Belarus
- La Flèche, France
