= Kalisz Voivodeship (1314–1793) =

Former administrative division of the Kingdom of Poland

Coordinates: 51°45′50″N 18°05′04″E

Kalisz Voivodeship Palatinatus Calisiensis (Latin) Województwo kaliskie (Polish)
- Voivodeship of Poland¹
- 1314–1793
- Coat of arms

- Kalisz Voivodeship in the Polish–Lithuanian Commonwealth in 1635.
- Capital: Kalisz
- Area
- 15,320 km^{2} (5,920 sq mi)
- History
  - Established: 1314
  - Split off Gniezno Voivodeship: 1768
  - Annexed by Prussia: 25 September 1793
- Political subdivisions: Counties: six until 1768, then three
Preceded by	Succeeded by
Duchy of Greater Poland / Duchy of Greater Poland	South Prussia
- Today part of: Poland
- ¹ Voivodeship of the Polish Crown in the Polish–Lithuanian Commonwealth; Voivodeship of the Kingdom of Poland before 1569.

Kalisz Voivodeship 1314–1793 (Polish: Województwo Kaliskie, Latin: Palatinatus Calisiensis) was an administrative unit of Poland from 1314 to the Second Partition of Poland in 1793. It was part of the Greater Poland Province. Its capital was in Kalisz, and together with neighboring Poznań Voivodeship, Kalisz elected general starosta of Greater Poland. The sejmiks for the two voivodeships took place at Środa Wielkopolska, while general sejmik for the whole Province of Greater Poland took place in Koło, at the Bernardine Abbey.

The territory of the voivodeship remained unchanged from 1314 until 1768, when Gniezno Voivodeship was carved out of its northern three counties. Its original area was 15,320 km^{2}., but after 1768 it shrank to 7,810 km^{2} (3,020 sq mi). Local starostas resided at Kalisz, Gniezno, Konin, Kcynia, Naklo, Pyzdry, and Złotów. Kalisz Voivodeship had eight senators. These were: Archbishop of Gniezno, Voivode of Kalisz (who resided at the Kalisz Royal Castle), Castellan of Kalisz, Castellan of Gniezno, and Castellans of Ląd, Nakło nad Notecią, Biechowo, and Kamieńsk.

Zygmunt Gloger in his monumental book Historical Geography of the Lands of Old Poland gives a detailed description of Kalisz Voivodeship:

"Kalisz Voivodeship made eastern half of Greater Poland proper (...) In the testament of Bolesław III Krzywousty, the Land of Kalisz, as part of Greater Poland, was granted to Duke Mieszko III the Old. His two grandsons, Przemysł I of Greater Poland and Bolesław the Pious divided Greater Poland in 1247. Przemyslaw, the older brother, controlled Gniezno and Poznań, while Boleslaw ruled Kalisz (...) In the late 14th century, the Duchy of Kalisz was seized by Wladyslaw Lokietek, returning to the Crown of the Kingdom of Poland as newly established Kalisz Voivodeship. Its total area was 300 sq. miles, and the largest county was that of Kalisz (...) In the mid-16th century, Kalisz Voivodeship had 411 Roman-Catholic parishes, 88 towns and 1,869 villages. Its coat of arms was Wieniawa.

Kalisz Voivodeship, together with Poznań Voivodeship had its sejmiks at Środa Wielkopolska, where each province elected six deputies to the Sejm, and two deputies to the Greater Poland Tribunal at Piotrków Trybunalski (...) Land court was at Kalisz, as well as town court for the counties of Kalisz, Kamieńsk and Pyzdry (...) The voivodeship had eight senators, while local starostas were located in several towns, such as Kalisz, Gniezno, Pyzdry, Konin, Kcynia, Ujście, Powidz, Odolanów, Kłecko, Pobiedziska, and Kolo (...) Among historic towns of the voivodeship were Kalisz, Gniezno, Lad, Wągrowiec, Mogilno, and Trzemeszno".

Greater Poland general governor (Starosta Generalny) seat:

- Poznań

Voivodeship governor (Wojewoda) seat:

- Kalisz

Voivodes:

- Zygmunt Grudziński (1628–1652)

Regional council (Sejmik) seat:

- Środa Wielkopolska

General council (Sejmik Generalny) for the Greater Poland seat:

- Koło

Administrative division (till 1768):

- Kalisz County (Powiat Kaliski), Kalisz
- Konin County (Powiat Koniński), Konin
- Pyzdry County (Powiat Pyzdrski), Pyzdry
- Gniezno County (Powiat Gnieżnieński), Gniezno
- Kcynia County (Powiat Kcyński), Kcynia
- Nakło County (Powiat Nakielski), Nakło

In 1768 counties of Gniezno, Kcynia and Nakło were transferred to the newly created Gniezno Voivodeship. As a result, in final years of the Polish–Lithuanian Commonwealth, Kalisz Voivodeship consisted of the following three counties:

- Kalisz County (Powiat Kaliski), Kalisz
- Konin County (Powiat Koniński), Konin
- Pyzdry County (Powiat Pyzdrski), Pyzdry

== Sources ==
- Kalisz Voivodeship, description by Zygmunt Gloger
