= Samborsko =

- Village
- Location within Poland
- Coordinates: 53°25′3″N 16°43′20″E
- Country: Poland
- Voivodeship: Greater Poland
- County: Złotów
- Gmina: Jastrowie
- Population: 480

Samborsko [samˈbɔrskɔ] (German: Zamborst) is a village in the administrative district of Gmina Jastrowie, within Złotów County, Greater Poland Voivodeship, in west-central Poland. It was founded in 1580 and had a church. The village lies approximately 5.5 kilometres (3 mi) west of Jastrowie, 23 km (14 mi) west of Złotów, and 114 km (71 mi) north of the regional capital Poznań.

Before 1945 the area was part of Prussia and later Germany. For the history of the region, see History of Pomerania and Territorial changes of Poland after World War II.

== Notable residents ==
- Michael Christoph Hanow (1695–1773), German scientist
- Gerhard Janensch (1860–1933), German sculptor and medailleur
