= Święta (disambiguation) =

Święta is the name of two villages in Poland:

- Święta, Greater Poland Voivodeship
- Święta, West Pomeranian Voivodeship

Święta means saint or holy and appears in many more Polish place names:

- Święta Lipka
- Święta Katarzyna, Lower Silesian Voivodeship
- Święta Katarzyna, Świętokrzyskie Voivodeship
- Święta Anna, Silesian Voivodeship
- Nowa Święta
