= Nowy Głomsk =

- Village
- Location within Poland
- Coordinates: 53°26′38″N 17°9′51″E
- Country: Poland
- Voivodeship: Greater Poland
- County: Złotów
- Gmina: Zakrzewo
- Time zone: UTC+1 (CET)
  - Summer (DST): UTC+2 (CEST)
- Vehicle registration: PZL

Nowy Głomsk [ˈnɔvɨ ˈɡwɔmsk] is a village in the administrative district of Gmina Zakrzewo, within Złotów County, Greater Poland Voivodeship, in north-central Poland.

Nowy Głomsk was founded after 1766 as a settlement adjacent to the village of Głomsk, hence its name, which means "New Głomsk".
