= Płytnica, Złotów County =

Płytnica
- Village
- Location within Poland
- Coordinates: 53°18′25″N 16°47′26″E
- Country: Poland
- Voivodeship: Greater Poland
- County: Złotów
- Gmina: Tarnówka
- Population: 190

Płytnica [pwɨtˈnit͡sa] (German: Plietnitz) is a village in the administrative district of Gmina Tarnówka, within Złotów County, Greater Poland Voivodeship, in west-central Poland.

Before 1772 the area was part of Kingdom of Poland, 1772-1945 Prussia and Germany. For more on its history, see Złotów County.
