= Ptusza =

- Village
- Location within Poland
- Coordinates: 53°21′58″N 16°47′16″E
- Country: Poland
- Voivodeship: Greater Poland
- County: Złotów
- Gmina: Tarnówka
- Population: 130

Ptusza [ˈptuʂa] (German: Betkenhammer) is a village in the administrative district of Gmina Tarnówka, within Złotów County, Greater Poland Voivodeship, in west-central Poland.

Before 1772 the area was part of Kingdom of Poland, 1772-1945 Prussia and Germany. For more on its history, see Złotów County.
