= Rudna, Złotów County =

Rudna
- Village
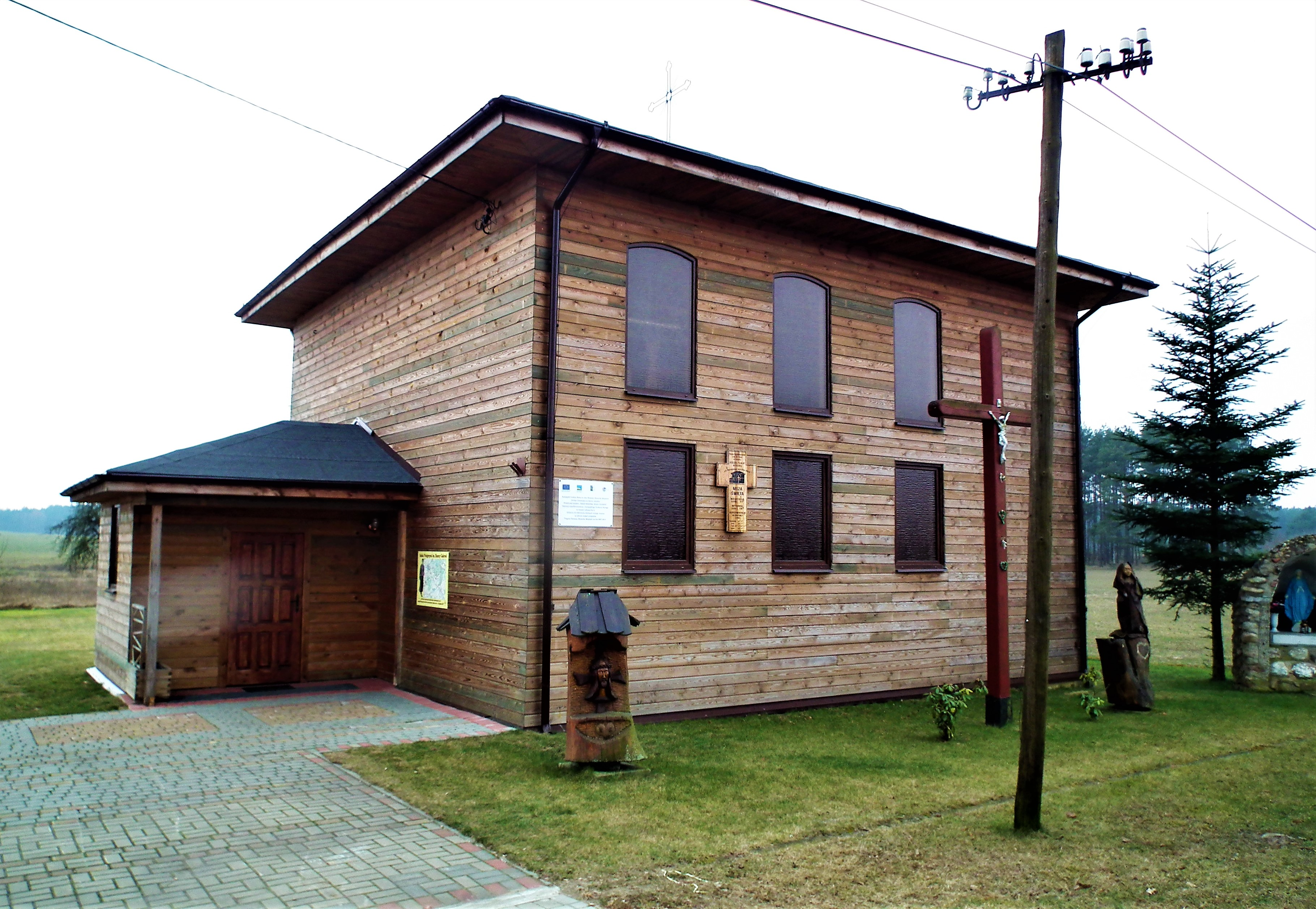
- Sacred Heart church in Rudna

- Location within Poland
- Coordinates: 53°19′22″N 17°14′45″E
- Country: Poland
- Voivodeship: Greater Poland
- County: Złotów
- Gmina: Złotów
- Population: 320
- Time zone: UTC+1 (CET)
  - Summer (DST): UTC+2 (CEST)

Rudna [ˈrudna] is a village in the administrative district of Gmina Złotów, within Złotów County, Greater Poland Voivodeship, in west-central Poland.

In the interbellum, a Polish school existed in the village. After the German invasion of Poland, which started World War II, Poles were persecuted. The Germans arrested local Polish activists and the local Polish teacher Czesław Mikołajczyk, who were imprisoned and killed in the Flossenbürg and Sachsenhausen concentration camps.
