= Łopienko =

- Village
- Location within Poland
- Coordinates: 53°23′8″N 16°59′48″E
- Country: Poland
- Voivodeship: Greater Poland
- County: Złotów
- Gmina: Złotów
- Population: 20

Łopienko [wɔˈpjɛnkɔ] is a village in the administrative district of Gmina Złotów, within Złotów County, Greater Poland Voivodeship, in west-central Poland.
