= Skic =

- Village
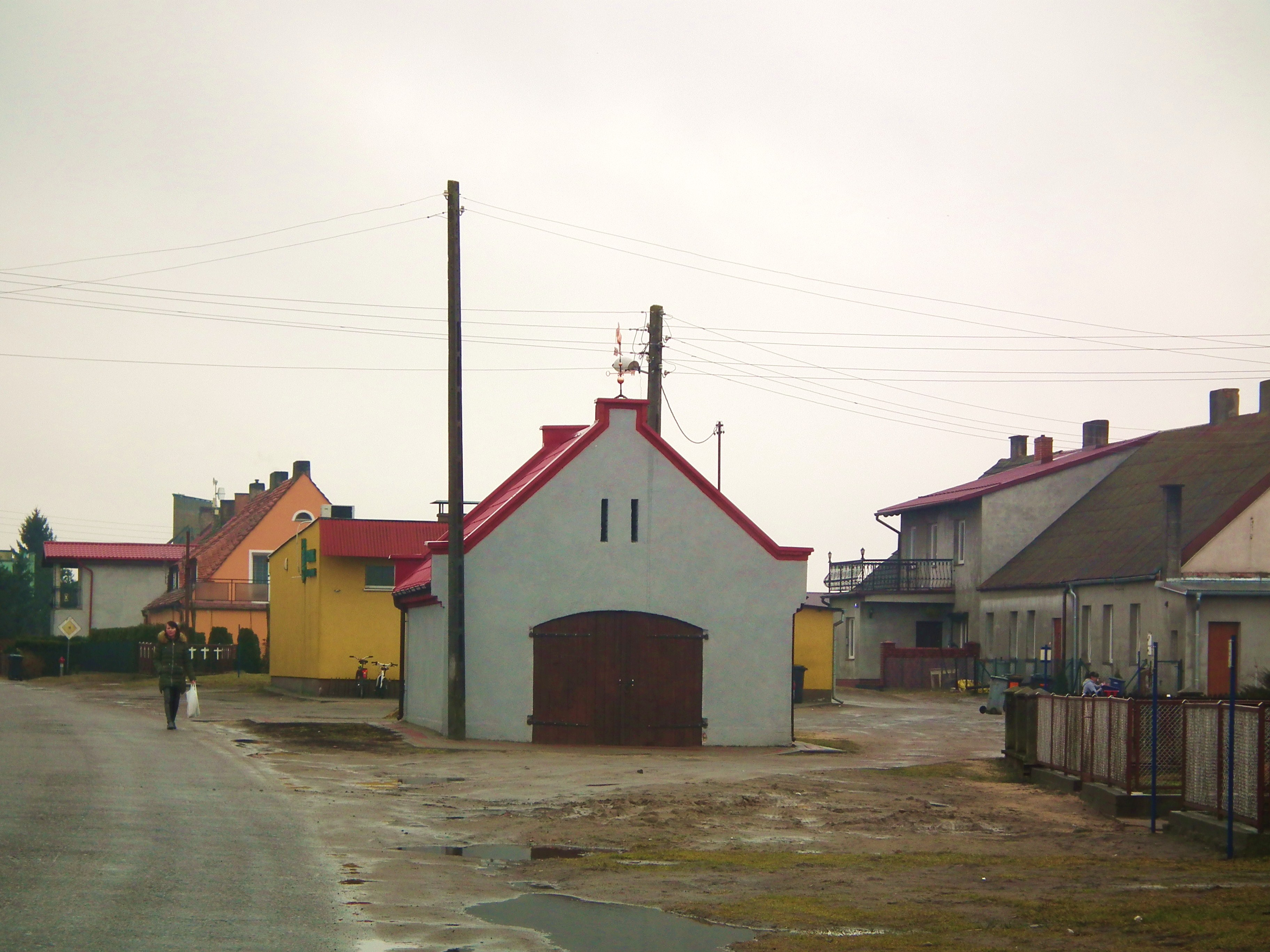

- Location within Poland
- Coordinates: 53°19′N 17°11′E
- Country: Poland
- Voivodeship: Greater Poland
- County: Złotów
- Gmina: Złotów
- Population: 500
- Time zone: UTC+1 (CET)
  - Summer (DST): UTC+2 (CEST)
- Vehicle registration: PZL

Skic [skit͡s] is a village in the administrative district of Gmina Złotów, within Złotów County, Greater Poland Voivodeship, in north-central Poland. It is situated on the Skitnica River in the ethnocultural region of Krajna in the historic region of Greater Poland.

== History ==
The territory became a part of the emerging Polish state under its first historic ruler Mieszko I in the 10th century. Skic was a private village of Polish nobility, including the Działyński and Grudziński families, administratively located in the Nakło County in the Kalisz Voivodeship in the Greater Poland Province.

In 1885, it had a population of 464.

During World War II, local Polish teachers were murdered by the German Nazis in Bydgoszcz and Toruń (see Nazi crimes against the Polish nation).

== Sports ==
The local football club is Piast Skic. It competes in the lower leagues.
