= Bługowo, Gmina Złotów =

Bługowo
- Village
- Location within Poland
- Coordinates: 53°16′N 17°8′E
- Country: Poland
- Voivodeship: Greater Poland
- County: Złotów
- Gmina: Złotów
- Population: 260

Bługowo [bwuˈɡɔvɔ] (German Blugowo) is a village in the administrative district of Gmina Złotów, within Złotów County, Greater Poland Voivodeship, in west-central Poland.
