= Pieczynek =

- Village
- Location within Poland
- Coordinates: 53°21′15″N 16°58′15″E
- Country: Poland
- Voivodeship: Greater Poland
- County: Złotów
- Gmina: Złotów

Pieczynek [pjɛˈt͡ʂɨnɛk] is a village in the administrative district of Gmina Złotów, within Złotów County, Greater Poland Voivodeship, in west-central Poland.
