= Radawnica =

- Village
- Location within Poland
- Coordinates: 53°27′N 16°59′E
- Country: Poland
- Voivodeship: Greater Poland
- County: Złotów
- Gmina: Złotów
- Population: 630

Radawnica [radavˈnit͡sa] (German: Radawnitz) is a village in the administrative district of Gmina Złotów, within Złotów County, Greater Poland Voivodeship, in west-central Poland.
