= Stawno, Greater Poland Voivodeship =

Stawno
- Settlement
- Location within Poland
- Coordinates: 53°22′38″N 17°4′49″E
- Country: Poland
- Voivodeship: Greater Poland
- County: Złotów
- Gmina: Złotów

Stawno [ˈstavnɔ] is a settlement in the administrative district of Gmina Złotów, within Złotów County, Greater Poland Voivodeship, in west-central Poland.
