= Wersk =

- Village
- Location within Poland
- Coordinates: 53°24′31″N 17°16′25″E
- Country: Poland
- Voivodeship: Greater Poland
- County: Złotów
- Gmina: Zakrzewo
- Population: 220
- Time zone: UTC+1 (CET)
  - Summer (DST): UTC+2 (CEST)
- Vehicle registration: PZL

Wersk [vɛrsk] is a village in the administrative district of Gmina Zakrzewo, within Złotów County, Greater Poland Voivodeship, in north-central Poland.

== History ==
As of 1467, the territory of Wersk was still forested, but soon, by the 16th century, the village had developed. Wersk was a private village of Polish nobility, administratively located in the Nakło County in the Kalisz Voivodeship in the Greater Poland Province of the Kingdom of Poland. It was annexed by Prussia in the First Partition of Poland in 1772, and from 1871 it was also part of Germany. In 1885, it had a population of 281.

In 1939, the Germans persecuted local Polish activists, who were either expelled or arrested and afterwards executed (see Nazi crimes against the Polish nation). After Germany's defeat in World War II, in 1945, the village was restored to Poland.
