= Klukowo, Greater Poland Voivodeship =

Klukowo
- Village
- Location within Poland
- Coordinates: 53°20′N 17°1′E
- Country: Poland
- Voivodeship: Greater Poland
- County: Złotów
- Gmina: Złotów
- Population: 230

Klukowo [kluˈkɔvɔ] is a village in the administrative district of Gmina Złotów, within Złotów County, Greater Poland Voivodeship, in west-central Poland.
