= Gajek =

Gajek may refer to:

== People ==
- Artur Gajek (born 1985), German road bicycle racer
- Sergiusz Gajek (born 1949), Polish apostolic visitor

== Places ==
- Gajek, Greater Poland Voivodeship, Poland
