= Kleszczynka =

- Village
- Location within Poland
- Coordinates: 53°17′51″N 17°7′25″E
- Country: Poland
- Voivodeship: Greater Poland
- County: Złotów
- Gmina: Złotów

Kleszczynka [klɛʂˈt͡ʂɨnka] is a village in the administrative district of Gmina Złotów, within Złotów County, Greater Poland Voivodeship, in west-central Poland.
