= Osowiec, Złotów County =

Osowiec
- Village
- Location within Poland
- Coordinates: 53°25′39″N 17°13′53″E
- Country: Poland
- Voivodeship: Greater Poland
- County: Złotów
- Gmina: Zakrzewo
- Population: 100

Osowiec [ɔˈsɔvjɛt͡s] is a village in the administrative district of Gmina Zakrzewo, within Złotów County, Greater Poland Voivodeship, in west-central Poland.

For more on its history, see Złotów County.
