= Międzybłocie =

- Village
- Location within Poland
- Coordinates: 53°21′38.1″N 17°05′25.8″E
- Country: Poland
- Voivodeship: Greater Poland
- County: Złotów
- Gmina: Złotów

Międzybłocie [mjɛnd͡zɨˈbwɔt͡ɕɛ] is a village in the administrative district of Gmina Złotów, within Złotów County, Greater Poland Voivodeship, in west-central Poland.
