= Blękwit =

- Village
- Location within Poland
- Coordinates: 53°20′52″N 17°01′07″E
- Country: Poland
- Voivodeship: Greater Poland
- County: Złotów
- Gmina: Złotów
- Population: 220

Blękwit [ˈblɛŋkfit] is a village in the administrative district of Gmina Złotów, within Złotów County, Greater Poland Voivodeship, in west-central Poland.

== Notable residents ==
- Herbert Pankau (1941–2025), German football player
