= Franciszkowo, Greater Poland Voivodeship =

Franciszkowo
- Village
- Location within Poland
- Coordinates: 53°25′N 16°59′E
- Country: Poland
- Voivodeship: Greater Poland
- County: Złotów
- Gmina: Złotów
- Population: 170

Franciszkowo [frant͡ɕiʂˈkɔvɔ] is a village in the administrative district of Gmina Złotów, within Złotów County, Greater Poland Voivodeship, in west-central Poland.

Before 1772 the area was part of Kingdom of Poland, 1772-1945 Prussia and Germany. For more on its history, see Złotów County.
