= Sypniewo, Złotów County =

Sypniewo
- Village
- Location within Poland
- Coordinates: 53°28′6″N 16°36′22″E
- Country: Poland
- Voivodeship: Greater Poland
- County: Złotów
- Gmina: Jastrowie
- Population: 1,300

Sypniewo [sɨpˈɲɛvɔ] (German: Zippnow) is a village in the administrative district of Gmina Jastrowie, within Złotów County, Greater Poland Voivodeship, in west-central Poland.

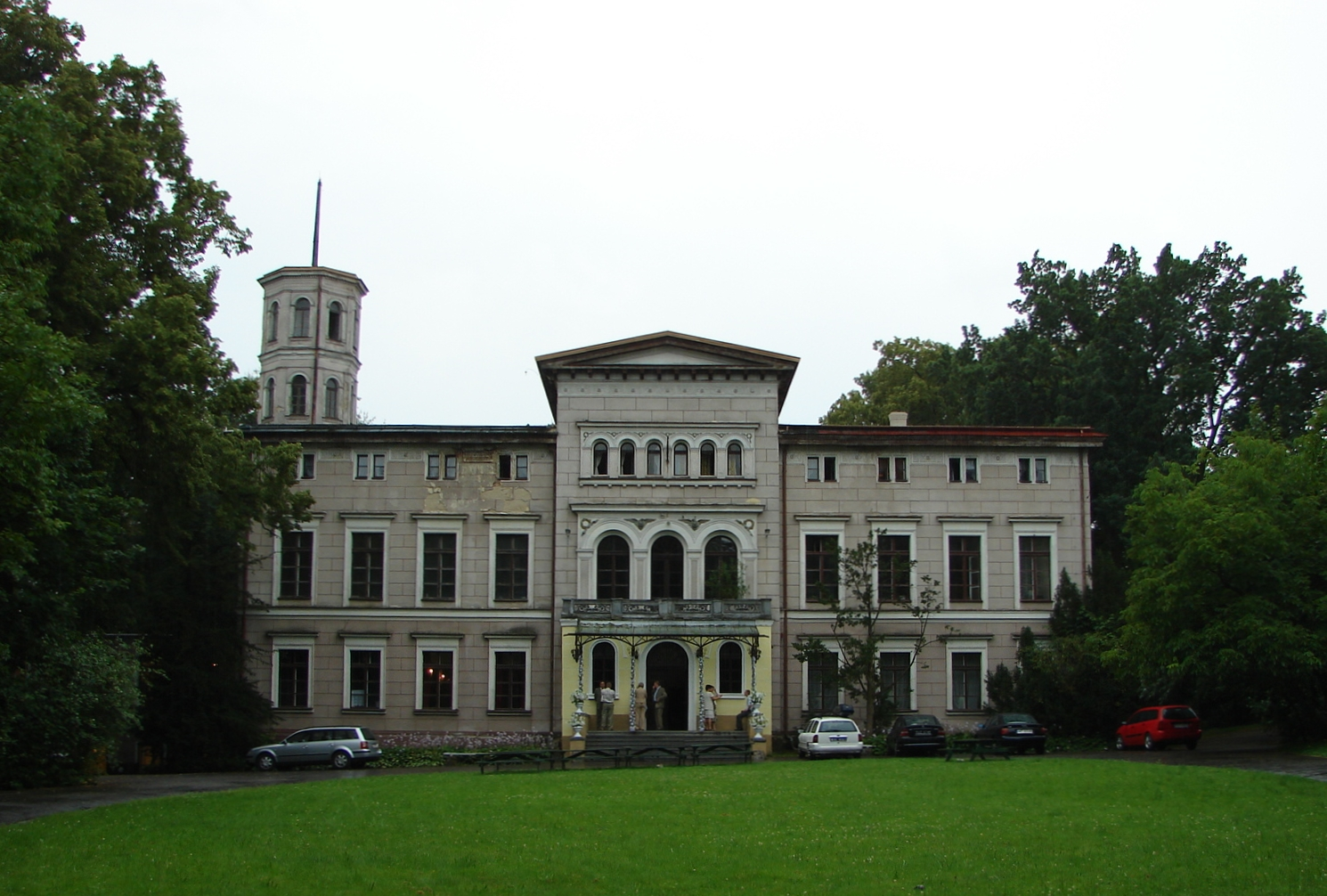
Sypniewo, Sępólno County, Kuyavian-Pomeranian Voivodeship, Poland

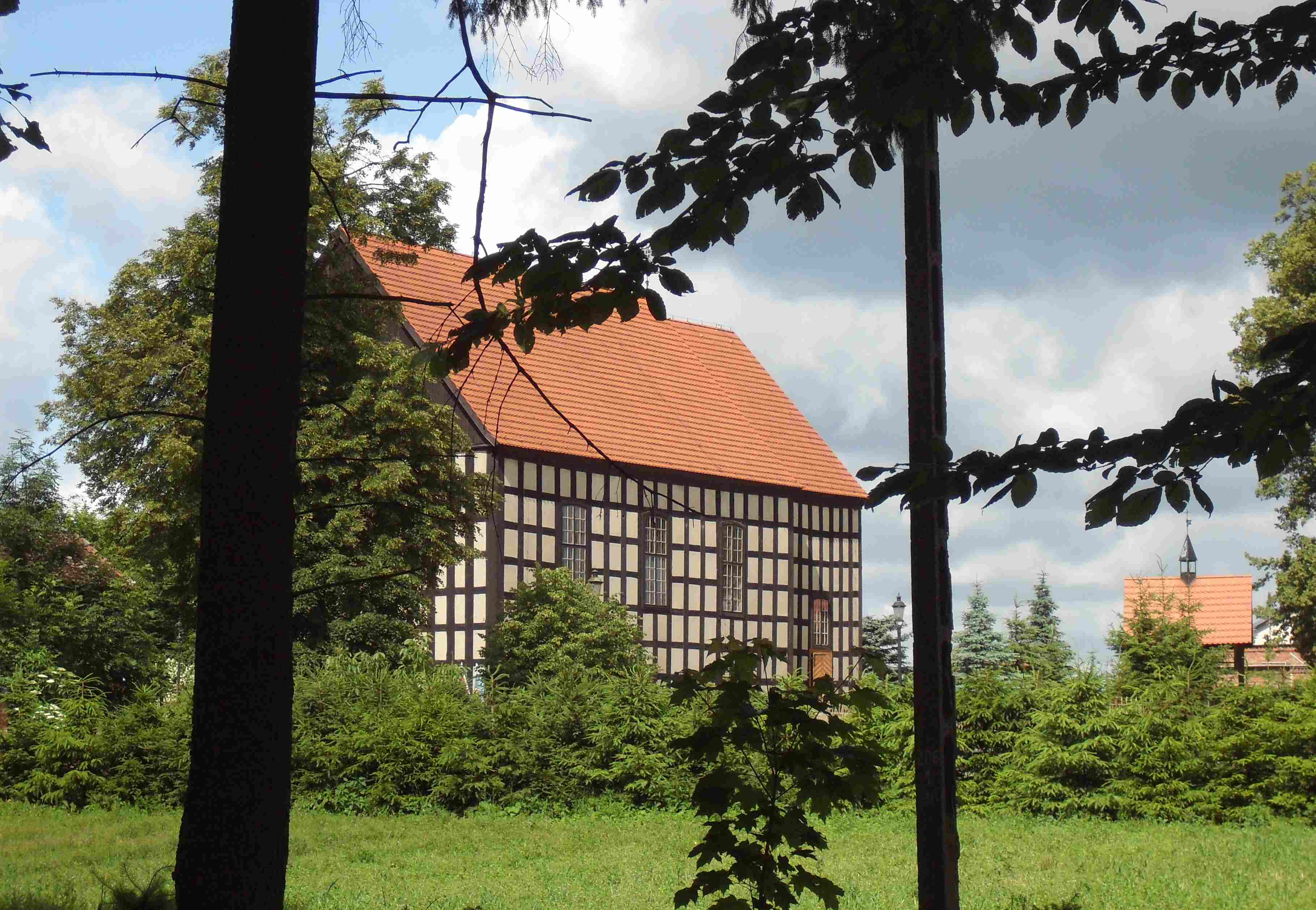
Sypniewo - kościół

== Notable residents ==
- Ernst Ottwalt (1901–1943), author
