= Nowa Święta-Leśniczówka =

- Village
- Location within Poland
- Coordinates: 53°20′26″N 17°08′45″E
- Country: Poland
- Voivodeship: Greater Poland
- County: Złotów
- Gmina: Złotów

Nowa Święta-Leśniczówka (Polish pronunciation: [ˈnɔva ˈɕfjɛnta lɛɕɲiˈt͡ʂufka]) is a village in the administrative district of Gmina Złotów, within Złotów County, Greater Poland Voivodeship, in west-central Poland.

For centuries, the area was part of the Kingdom of Poland and the Greater Poland region (often called the "cradle of Poland"), which beginning in the 10th-century formed the heart of the early Polish state. During the Partitions of Poland beginning in 1772, the area was annexed by Prussia. From 1871 to 1945, the area was part of Germany. In 1945, it rejoined Poland.
