= Bartoszkowo =

- Village
- Location within Poland
- Coordinates: 53°20′4″N 16°55′20″E
- Country: Poland
- Voivodeship: Greater Poland
- County: Złotów
- Gmina: Tarnówka
- Population: 350

Bartoszkowo (Polish pronunciation: [bartɔʂˈkɔvɔ]) is a village in the administrative district of Gmina Tarnówka, within Złotów County, Greater Poland Voivodeship, in west-central Poland.

Before 1772, the area was part of Kingdom of Poland, and from 1772 to 1945 was part of Prussia and Germany.
