= Drzewiec, Greater Poland Voivodeship =

Drzewiec
- Settlement
- Location within Poland
- Coordinates: 53°22′29″N 16°34′15″E
- Country: Poland
- Voivodeship: Greater Poland
- County: Złotów
- Gmina: Jastrowie

Drzewiec [ˈdʐɛvjɛt͡s] is a settlement in the administrative district of Gmina Jastrowie, within Złotów County, Greater Poland Voivodeship, in west-central Poland.
