= Kobylnik, Złotów County =

Kobylnik
- Village
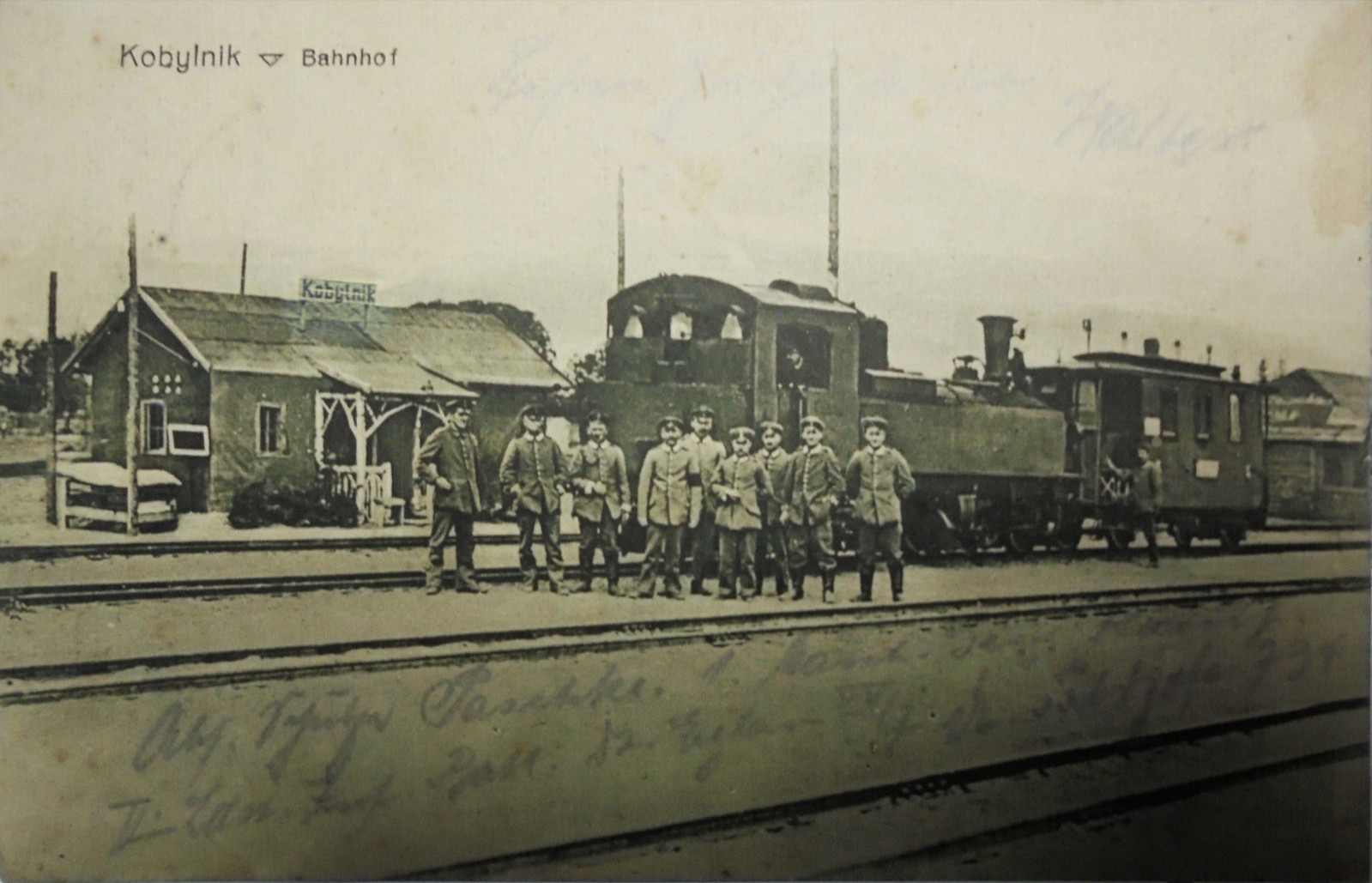
- German soldiers in Kobylnik during WWI

- Location within Poland
- Coordinates: 53°18′40″N 17°12′27″E
- Country: Poland
- Voivodeship: Greater Poland
- County: Złotów
- Gmina: Złotów

Kobylnik [kɔˈbɨlnik] is a village in the administrative district of Gmina Złotów, within Złotów County, Greater Poland Voivodeship, in west-central Poland.

Historically, the area was part of the Kingdom of Poland and the Greater Poland region, often regarded as the "cradle of Poland" due to its central role in the formation of the early Polish state under the Piast dynasty in the 10th century. Following the Partitions of Poland beginning in 1772, the village was annexed by Prussia, and from 1871 to 1945 it was incorporated into Germany. After the end of World War II in 1945, the area was restored to Poland.
