= Osówka, Greater Poland Voivodeship =

Osówka
- Village
- Location within Poland
- Coordinates: 53°22′14″N 16°52′26″E
- Country: Poland
- Voivodeship: Greater Poland
- County: Złotów
- Gmina: Tarnówka
- Population: 210
- Time zone: UTC+1 (CET)
  - Summer (DST): UTC+2 (CEST)
- Vehicle registration: PZL

Osówka [ɔˈsufka] is a village in the administrative district of Gmina Tarnówka, within Złotów County, Greater Poland Voivodeship, in north-central Poland. It is situated in the ethnocultural region of Krajna in northern Greater Poland.

== History ==
The territory became a part of the emerging Polish state under its first historic ruler Mieszko I in the 10th century. Osówka was a private village of Polish nobility, administratively located in the Nakło County in the Kalisz Voivodeship in the Greater Poland Province. It was annexed by Prussia in the First Partition of Poland in 1772, and from 1871 it was also part of Germany. In 1926, the German government renamed the village to Espenhagen in attempt to erase traces of Polish origin. After Germany's defeat in World War II, in 1945, the village became again part of Poland and its historic name was restored.
