= Sypniewko-Folwark =

- Settlement
- Location within Poland
- Coordinates: 53°27′26″N 16°33′14″E
- Country: Poland
- Voivodeship: Greater Poland
- County: Złotów
- Gmina: Jastrowie

Sypniewko-Folwark [sɨpˈɲɛfkɔ ˈfɔlvark] is a settlement in the administrative district of Gmina Jastrowie, within Złotów County, Greater Poland Voivodeship, in west-central Poland.
