= Górzna =

- Village
- Location within Poland
- Coordinates: 53°23′N 16°55′E
- Country: Poland
- Voivodeship: Greater Poland
- County: Złotów
- Gmina: Złotów
- Population: 600

Górzna [ˈɡuʐna] is a village in the administrative district of Gmina Złotów, within Złotów County, Greater Poland Voivodeship, in west-central Poland.

== Notable residents ==
- Hans Gollnick (1892–1970), general
