= Kamień, Złotów County =

Kamień
- Village
- Location within Poland
- Coordinates: 53°26′N 16°56′E
- Country: Poland
- Voivodeship: Greater Poland
- County: Złotów
- Gmina: Złotów
- Population: 370

Kamień (Polish pronunciation: [ˈkamjɛj̃] is a village in the administrative district of Gmina Złotów, within Złotów County, Greater Poland Voivodeship, in west-central Poland.
