= Krzywa Wieś, Greater Poland Voivodeship =

Krzywa Wieś
- Village
- Location within Poland
- Coordinates: 53°29′N 17°0′E
- Country: Poland
- Voivodeship: Greater Poland
- County: Złotów
- Gmina: Złotów
- Population: 210

Krzywa Wieś [ˈkʂɨva ˈvjɛɕ] is a village in the administrative district of Gmina Złotów, within Złotów County, Greater Poland Voivodeship, in west-central Poland.
