= Trzebieszki, Greater Poland Voivodeship =

Trzebieszki
- Settlement
- Location within Poland
- Coordinates: 53°21′45″N 16°37′05″E
- Country: Poland
- Voivodeship: Greater Poland
- County: Złotów
- Gmina: Jastrowie

Trzebieszki (Polish pronunciation: [tʂɛˈbjɛskʲi]) is a settlement in the administrative district of Gmina Jastrowie, within Złotów County, Greater Poland Voivodeship, in west-central Poland.
