= Płosków =

Płosków may refer to the following places:

- Płosków, Greater Poland Voivodeship (west-central Poland)
- Płosków, Kuyavian-Pomeranian Voivodeship (north-central Poland)
- Płosków, Masovian Voivodeship (east-central Poland)
