= Łączyn, Greater Poland Voivodeship =

Łączyn
- Village
- Location within Poland
- Coordinates: 53°23′49″N 17°6′54″E
- Country: Poland
- Voivodeship: Greater Poland
- County: Złotów
- Gmina: Zakrzewo

Łączyn [ˈwɔnt͡ʂɨn] is a village in the administrative district of Gmina Zakrzewo, within Złotów County, Greater Poland Voivodeship, in west-central Poland.

For more on its history, see Złotów County.
