= Tarnowiec-Elektrownia =

- Settlement
- Location within Poland
- Coordinates: 53°20′25″N 16°49′6″E
- Country: Poland
- Voivodeship: Greater Poland
- County: Złotów
- Gmina: Tarnówka

Tarnowiec-Elektrownia [tarˈnɔvjɛt͡s ɛlɛkˈtrɔvɲa] is a settlement in the administrative district of Gmina Tarnówka, within Złotów County, Greater Poland Voivodeship, in west-central Poland.

Before 1772 the area was part of Kingdom of Poland, 1772-1945 Prussia and Germany. For more on its history, see Złotów County.
