= Zalesie, Złotów County =

Zalesie
- Village
- Location within Poland
- Coordinates: 53°21′N 16°57′E
- Country: Poland
- Voivodeship: Greater Poland
- County: Złotów
- Gmina: Złotów
- Population: 290

Zalesie [zaˈlɛɕɛ] is a village in the administrative district of Gmina Złotów, within Złotów County, Greater Poland Voivodeship, in west-central Poland.
