= Stara Wiśniewka =

- Village
- Location within Poland
- Coordinates: 53°26′51″N 17°5′32″E
- Country: Poland
- Voivodeship: Greater Poland
- County: Złotów
- Gmina: Zakrzewo
- Population: 567

Stara Wiśniewka [ˈstara viɕˈɲɛfka] is a village in the administrative district of Gmina Zakrzewo, within Złotów County, Greater Poland Voivodeship, in west-central Poland.
