= Nowe Zakrzewo, Greater Poland Voivodeship =

Nowe Zakrzewo
- Village
- Location within Poland
- Coordinates: 53°24′13″N 17°7′46″E
- Country: Poland
- Voivodeship: Greater Poland
- County: Złotów
- Gmina: Zakrzewo

Nowe Zakrzewo [ˈnɔvɛ zaˈkʂɛvɔ] is a village in the administrative district of Gmina Zakrzewo, within Złotów County, Greater Poland Voivodeship, in west-central Poland.

For more on its history, see Złotów County.
