= Annopole, Złotów County =

Annopole
- Village
- Location within Poland
- Coordinates: 53°20′12″N 16°57′24″E
- Country: Poland
- Voivodeship: Greater Poland
- County: Złotów
- Gmina: Tarnówka
- Population: 80

Annopole [annɔˈpɔlɛ] is a village in the administrative district of Gmina Tarnówka, within Złotów County, Greater Poland Voivodeship, in west-central Poland.

Before 1772 the area was part of Kingdom of Poland, 1772-1945 Prussia and Germany. For more on its history, see Złotów County.
