= Stawnica, Greater Poland Voivodeship =

Stawnica
- Village
- Location within Poland
- Coordinates: 53°24′N 17°4′E
- Country: Poland
- Voivodeship: Greater Poland
- County: Złotów
- Gmina: Złotów
- Population: 590
- Time zone: UTC+1 (CET)
  - Summer (DST): UTC+2 (CEST)
- Vehicle registration: PZL

Stawnica [stavˈnit͡sa] is a village in the administrative district of Gmina Złotów, within Złotów County, Greater Poland Voivodeship, in north-central Poland.

== History ==
For centuries, the area was part of the Kingdom of Poland and the Greater Poland region (often called the "cradle of Poland"), which beginning in the 10th-century formed the heart of the early Polish state. Stawnica was a private village of Polish nobility, administratively located in the Nakło County in the Kalisz Voivodeship in the Greater Poland Province. During the First Partition of Poland in 1772, it was annexed by Prussia. From 1871 to 1945 it was part of Germany. In 1939, the Nazi German Bund Deutscher Osten organization attacked and devastated the local Polish school. In 1945, it rejoined Poland.
