= Kleszczyna =

- Village
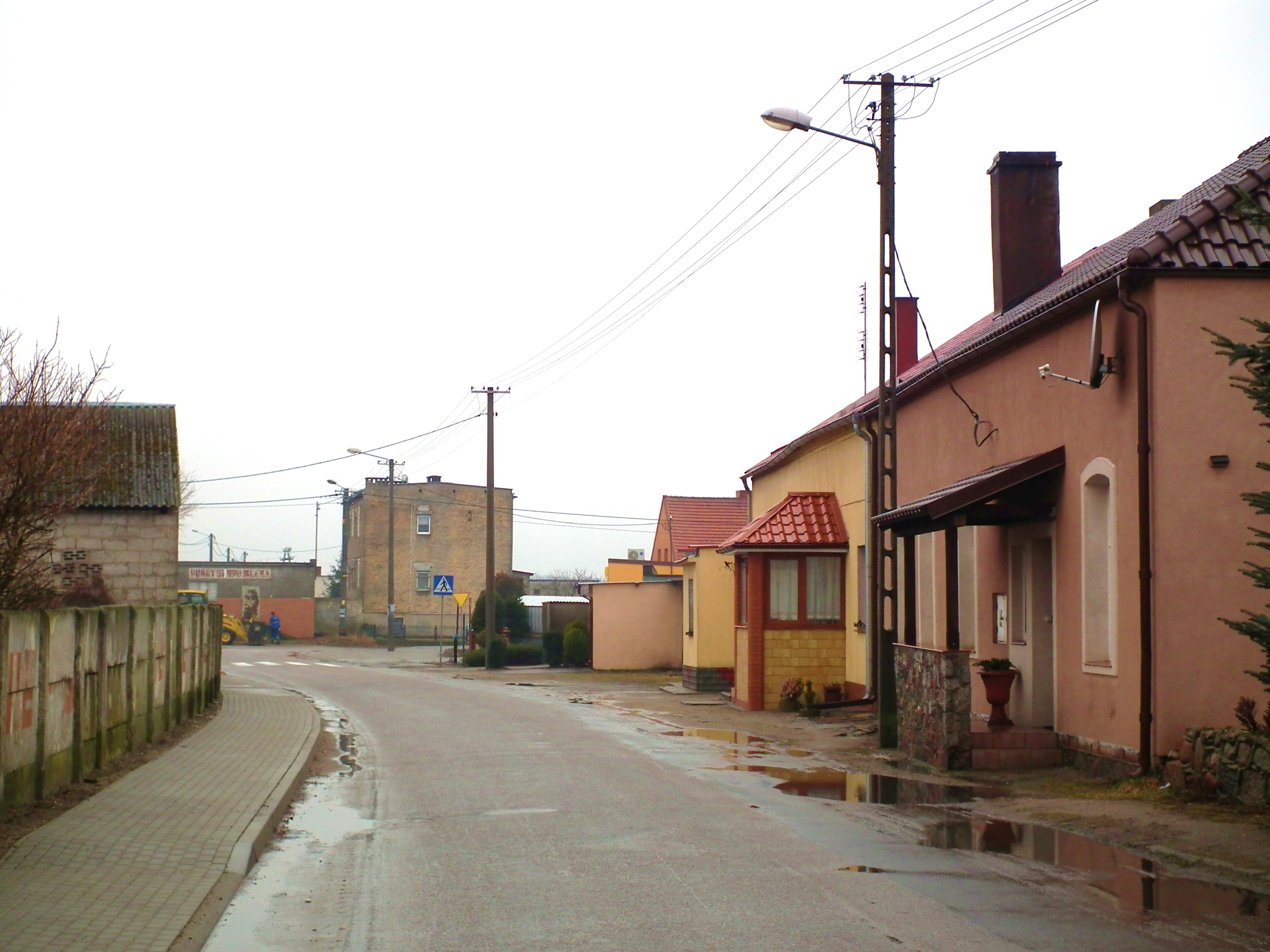
- Houses in Kleszczyna

- Location within Poland
- Coordinates: 53°18′23″N 17°07′45″E
- Country: Poland
- Voivodeship: Greater Poland
- County: Złotów
- Gmina: Złotów
- Population: 480
- Time zone: UTC+1 (CET)
  - Summer (DST): UTC+2 (CEST)
- Vehicle registration: PZL

Kleszczyna [klɛʂˈt͡ʂɨna] is a village in the administrative district of Gmina Złotów, within Złotów County, Greater Poland Voivodeship, in north-central Poland.

== History ==
For centuries, the area was part of the Kingdom of Poland and the Greater Poland region (often called the "cradle of Poland"), which beginning in the 10th-century formed the heart of the early Polish state. Kleszczyna was a private village of Polish nobility, administratively located in the Nakło County in the Kalisz Voivodeship in the Greater Poland Province. During the First Partition of Poland in 1772, it was annexed by Prussia. From 1871 to 1945 it was part of Germany. During World War II, the Germans arrested local Polish teacher Bronisław Kokowski and then beheaded him in Berlin (see Nazi crimes against the Polish nation). In 1945, it rejoined Poland.
