= Nowa Kleszczyna =

- Village
- Location within Poland
- Coordinates: 53°18′24″N 17°8′34″E
- Country: Poland
- Voivodeship: Greater Poland
- County: Złotów
- Gmina: Złotów

Nowa Kleszczyna [ˈnɔva klɛʂˈt͡ʂɨna] is a village in the administrative district of Gmina Złotów, within Złotów County, Greater Poland Voivodeship, in west-central Poland.
