= Dzierzążenko =

- Village
- Location within Poland
- Coordinates: 53°23′09″N 17°02′18″E
- Country: Poland
- Voivodeship: Greater Poland
- County: Złotów
- Gmina: Złotów
- Population: 170

Dzierzążenko [d͡ʑɛʐɔ̃ˈʐɛnkɔ] is a village in the administrative district of Gmina Złotów, within Złotów County, Greater Poland Voivodeship, in west-central Poland.
