= Ługi, Złotów County =

Ługi
- Village
- Location within Poland
- Coordinates: 53°27′10″N 17°07′35″E
- Country: Poland
- Voivodeship: Greater Poland
- County: Złotów
- Gmina: Zakrzewo
- Population: 120

Ługi [ˈwuɡi] is a village in the administrative district of Gmina Zakrzewo, within Złotów County, Greater Poland Voivodeship, in west-central Poland.

For more on its history, see Złotów County.
