= Buntowo =

- Village
- Location within Poland
- Coordinates: 53°15′N 17°7′E
- Country: Poland
- Voivodeship: Greater Poland
- County: Złotów
- Gmina: Złotów
- Population: 320

Buntowo [bunˈtɔvɔ] is a village in the administrative district of Gmina Złotów, within Złotów County, Greater Poland Voivodeship, in west-central Poland.
