= Drożyska Średnie =

- Village
- Location within Poland
- Coordinates: 53°22′39″N 17°07′27″E
- Country: Poland
- Voivodeship: Greater Poland
- County: Złotów
- Gmina: Zakrzewo
- Population: 40

Drożyska Średnie [drɔˈʐɨska ˈɕrɛdɲɛ] is a village in the administrative district of Gmina Zakrzewo, within Złotów County, Greater Poland Voivodeship, in west-central Poland.

Before 1772 the area was part of Kingdom of Poland, 1772-1945 Prussia and Germany. For more on its history, see Złotów County.
