= Sypniewko =

- Village
- Location within Poland
- Coordinates: 53°27′57″N 16°32′21″E
- Country: Poland
- Voivodeship: Greater Poland
- County: Złotów
- Gmina: Jastrowie
- Population: 40

Sypniewko [sɨpˈɲɛfkɔ] (German: Neu Zippnow) is a village in the administrative district of Gmina Jastrowie, within Złotów County, Greater Poland Voivodeship, in west-central Poland.

Before 1772 the area was part of Kingdom of Poland, 1772-1945 Prussia and Germany. For more on its history, see Złotów County and Territorial changes of Poland after World War II.
