= Pieczyn =

- Village
- Location within Poland
- Coordinates: 53°22′42″N 16°56′13″E
- Country: Poland
- Voivodeship: Greater Poland
- County: Złotów
- Gmina: Złotów
- Population: 40

Pieczyn [ˈpjɛt͡ʂɨn] (German: Luisenhof) is a village in the administrative district of Gmina Złotów, within Złotów County, Greater Poland Voivodeship, in west-central Poland.
