= Karolewo, Złotów County =

Karolewo
- Village
- Location within Poland
- Coordinates: 53°23′N 17°10′E
- Country: Poland
- Voivodeship: Greater Poland
- County: Złotów
- Gmina: Zakrzewo

Karolewo [karɔˈlɛvɔ] is a village in the administrative district of Gmina Zakrzewo, within Złotów County, Greater Poland Voivodeship, in west-central Poland.

For more on its history, see Złotów County.
