= Wielatowo =

- Village
- Location within Poland
- Coordinates: 53°22′40″N 17°0′40″E
- Country: Poland
- Voivodeship: Greater Poland
- County: Złotów
- Gmina: Złotów

Wielatowo [vjɛlaˈtɔvɔ] is a village in the administrative district of Gmina Złotów, within Złotów County, Greater Poland Voivodeship, in west-central Poland.
