= Wąsosz, Greater Poland Voivodeship =

Wąsosz
- Village
- Location within Poland
- Coordinates: 53°19′N 17°4′E
- Country: Poland
- Voivodeship: Greater Poland
- County: Złotów
- Gmina: Złotów

Population
  - Total: 130
- Postal code: 77-400

Wąsosz [ˈvɔ̃sɔʂ] is a village in the administrative district of Gmina Złotów, within Złotów County, Greater Poland Voivodeship, in north-central Poland.
