= Kujanki, Greater Poland Voivodeship =

Kujanki
- Settlement
- Location within Poland
- Coordinates: 53°22′33″N 17°11′6″E
- Country: Poland
- Voivodeship: Greater Poland
- County: Złotów
- Gmina: Zakrzewo

Kujanki [kuˈjanki] is a settlement in the administrative district of Gmina Zakrzewo, within Złotów County, Greater Poland Voivodeship, in west-central Poland.
