= Piaski-Leśniczówka =

- Settlement
- Location within Poland
- Coordinates: 53°20′53″N 16°37′43″E
- Country: Poland
- Voivodeship: Greater Poland
- County: Złotów
- Gmina: Jastrowie

Piaski-Leśniczówka (Polish pronunciation: [ˈpjaskʲi lɛɕɲiˈtʂufka]) is a settlement in the administrative district of Gmina Jastrowie, within Złotów County, Greater Poland Voivodeship, in west-central Poland.
