= Czarnołęka =

Uninhabited island

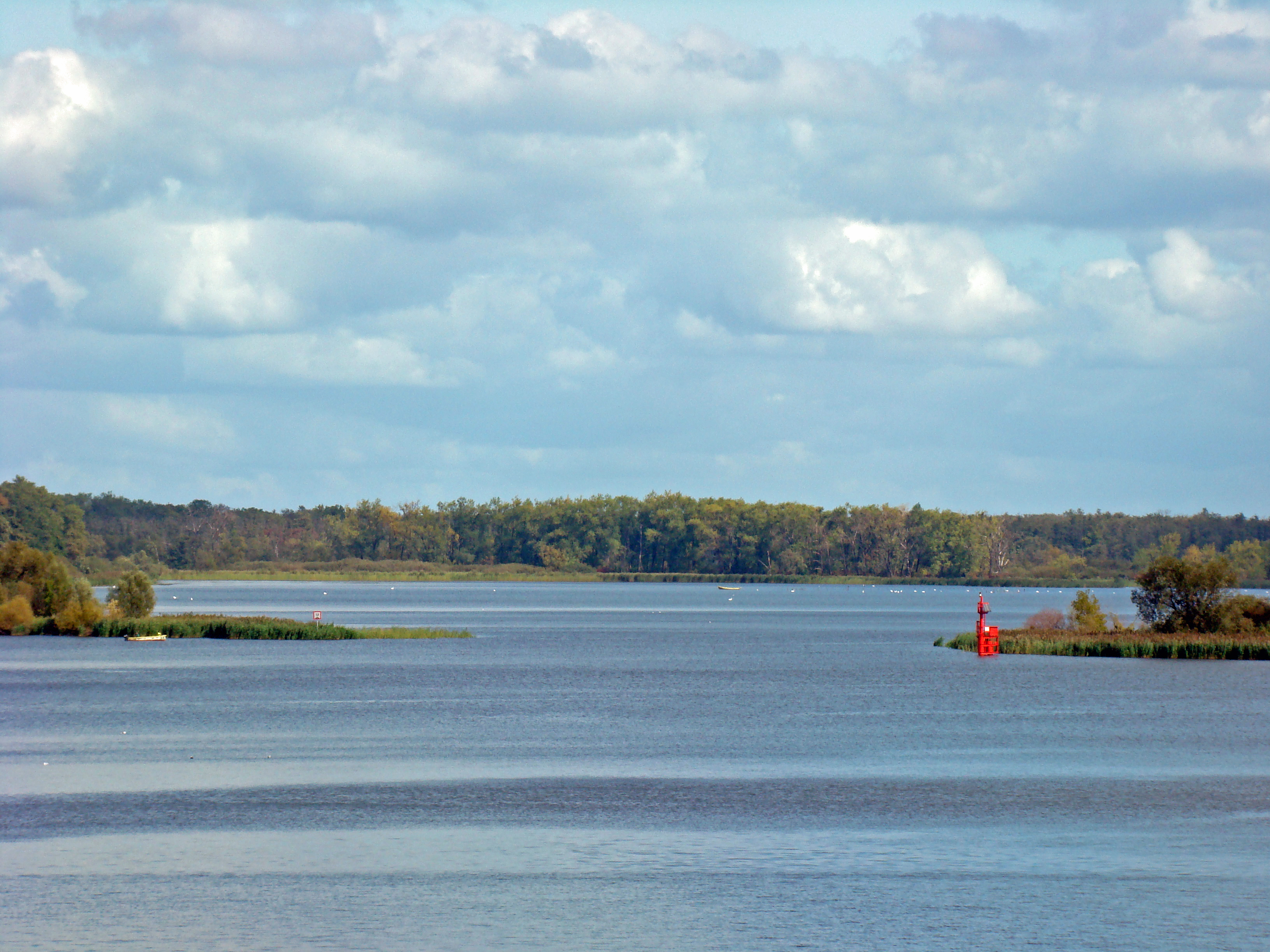
- Orli Przesmyk with Czarnołęka in the background
- Interactive map of Czarnołęka

Geography
- Coordinates: 53°27′49″N 14°38′3″E
- Area: 2.7 km^{2} (1.0 sq mi)

Administration
- Poland

Demographics
- Population: 0

Czarnołęka (also Dębinka; German: Schwarze Ort until 1945) is an uninhabited island in the Międzyodrze area, located along the western shore of Dąbie Lake in Szczecin, north-western Poland.

== Description ==
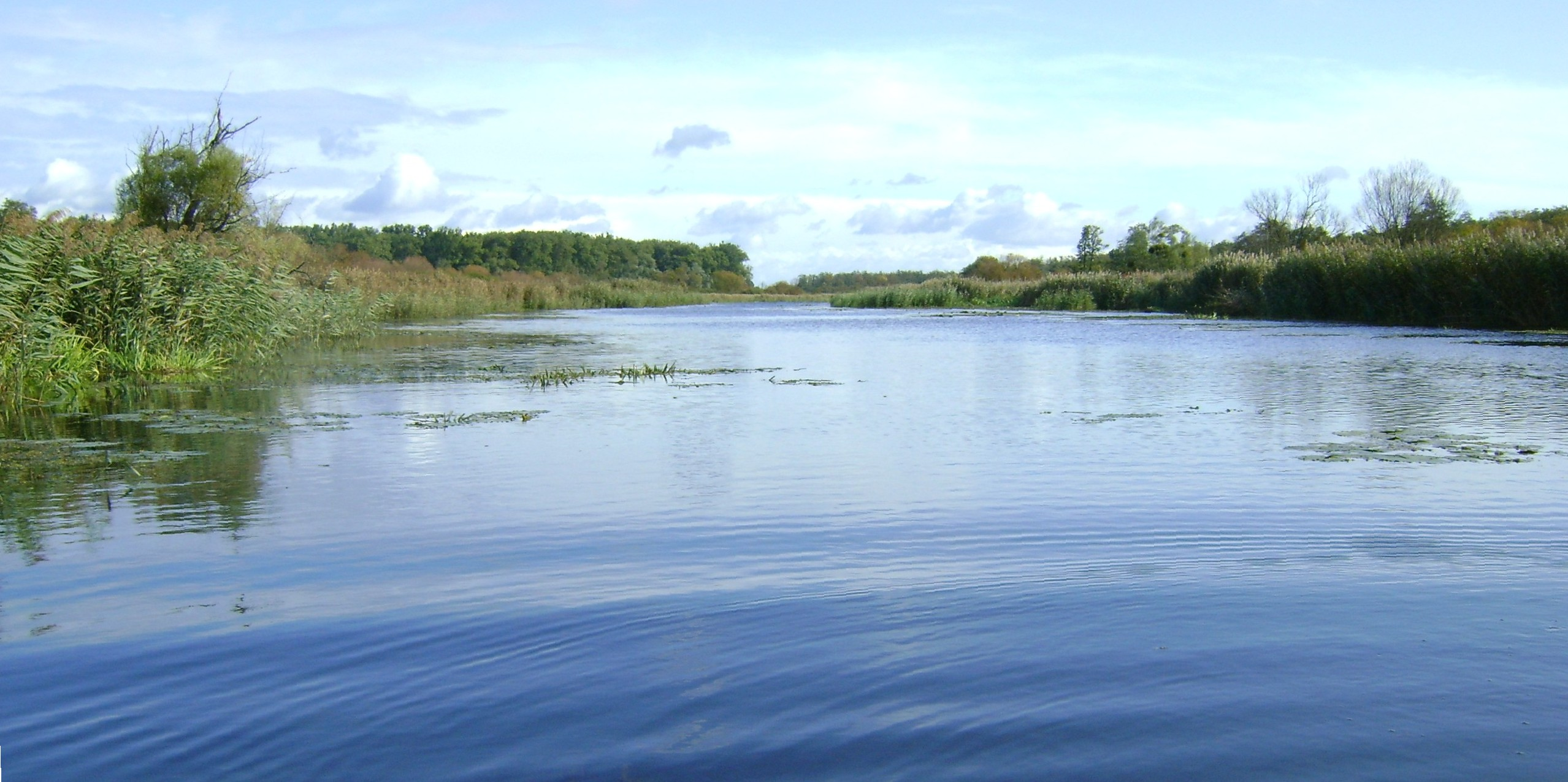
View from the Wydrnik; Czarnołęka on the left, Radolin on the right

Administratively, the island lies within the city of Szczecin, in the Północ district, and covers an area of about 270 hectares.

From the south, it forms two bays on Lake Dąbie (from west): Ostrołęka Bay and Kopice Bay, and is adjacent via the Dąbski Przesmyk to the small island of Mały Róg. To the west, it is separated from Radolin by the Wydrnik, and to the north from Dębina by the Święta.

The forested areas of the island, forming part of the Puszcze Szczecińskie (Szczecin Forests) promotional forest complex, are administered by the Nadleśnictwo Trzebież (Trzebież Forest District).

The name Czarnołęka was officially introduced in 1949, replacing the former German name Der schwarze Ort.
