= Prochy, Złotów County =

Prochy
- Village
- Location within Poland
- Coordinates: 53°25′20″N 17°05′28″E
- Country: Poland
- Voivodeship: Greater Poland
- County: Złotów
- Gmina: Zakrzewo
- Population: 110

Prochy [ˈprɔxɨ] is a village in the administrative district of Gmina Zakrzewo, within Złotów County, Greater Poland Voivodeship, in west-central Poland.

For more on its history, see Złotów County.
