= Kujan =

- Village
- Location within Poland
- Coordinates: 53°22′N 17°12′E
- Country: Poland
- Voivodeship: Greater Poland
- County: Złotów
- Gmina: Zakrzewo
- Population: 220

Kujan [ˈkujan] is a village in the administrative district of Gmina Zakrzewo, within Złotów County, Greater Poland Voivodeship, in west-central Poland.

Before 1772, the area was part of the Kingdom of Poland. For more on its history, see Złotów County.
