= Krępsko =

Krępsko may refer to:

- Krępsko, Greater Poland Voivodeship (west-central Poland)
- Krępsko, Złotów County in Greater Poland Voivodeship (west-central Poland)
- Krępsko, West Pomeranian Voivodeship (north-west Poland)
