= Sypniewo-Kolonia =

- Settlement
- Location within Poland
- Coordinates: 53°26′46″N 16°37′40″E
- Country: Poland
- Voivodeship: Greater Poland
- County: Złotów
- Gmina: Jastrowie

Sypniewo-Kolonia [sɨpˈɲɛvɔ kɔˈlɔɲa] is a settlement in the administrative district of Gmina Jastrowie, within Złotów County, Greater Poland Voivodeship, in west-central Poland.
