= Nadarzyce, Złotów County =

Nadarzyce
- Village
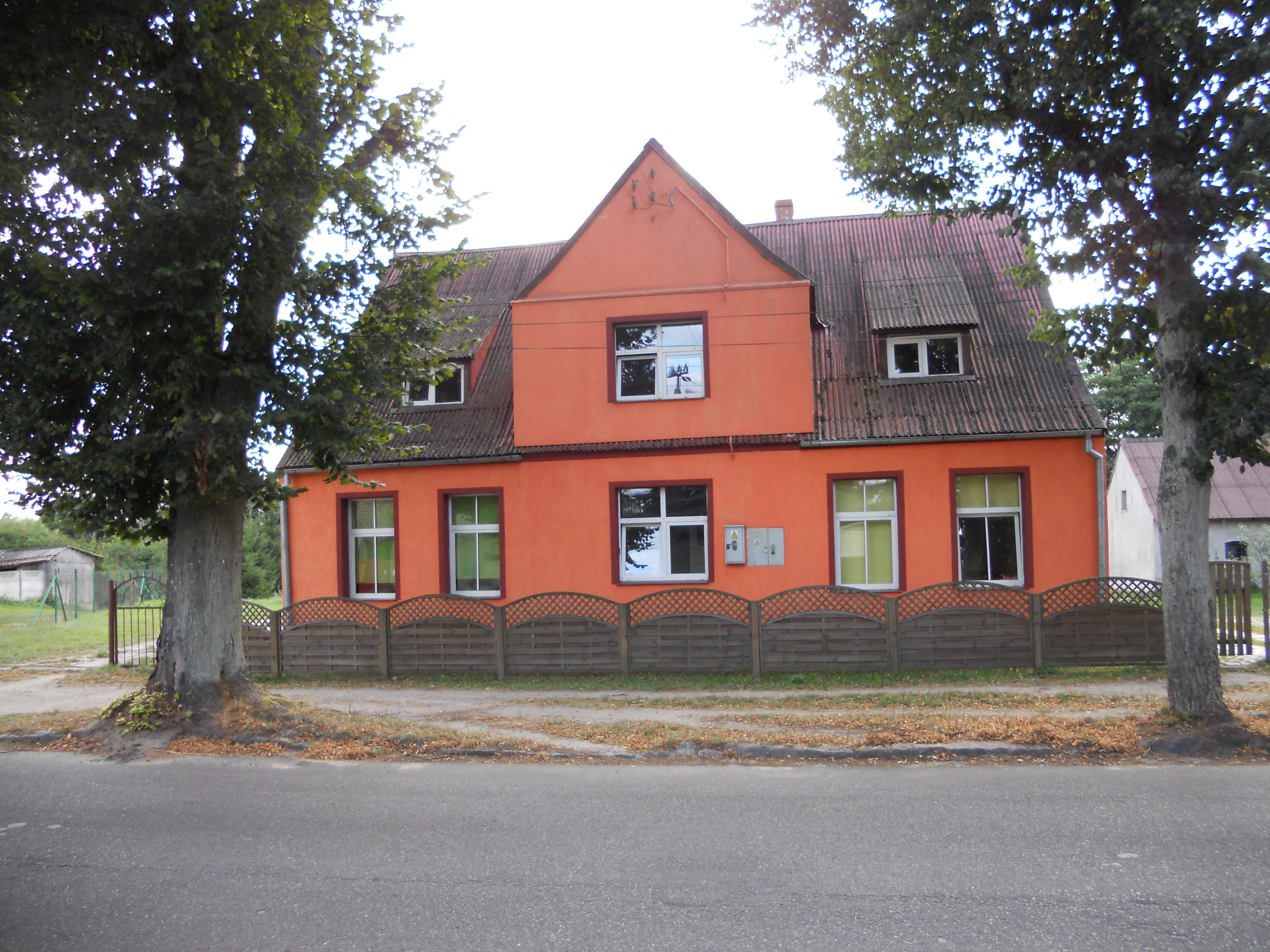

- Location within Poland
- Coordinates: 53°27′57″N 16°29′39″E
- Country: Poland
- Voivodeship: Greater Poland
- County: Złotów
- Gmina: Jastrowie

Population
  - Total: 300
- Time zone: UTC+1 (CET)
  - Summer (DST): UTC+2 (CEST)
- Vehicle registration: PZL

Nadarzyce [nadaˈʐɨt͡sɛ] (German: Rederitz) is a village in the administrative district of Gmina Jastrowie, within Złotów County, Greater Poland Voivodeship, in north-western Poland.

== History ==
The territory became a part of the emerging Polish state under its first historic ruler Mieszko I in the 10th century. Nadarzyce was a royal village of the Kingdom of Poland, administratively located in the Wałcz County in the Poznań Voivodeship in the Greater Poland Province. It was annexed by Prussia in the First Partition of Poland in 1772, and from 1871 it was also part of Germany.

During World War II, in 1942–1943, the German administration operated the Stalag 302 prisoner-of-war camp in the village. On 5–6 February 1945, it was the site of a battle between Polish troops and German troops, won by the Poles, and afterwards it was restored to Poland.
