= Piecewo, Greater Poland Voivodeship =

Piecewo
- Village
- Location within Poland
- Coordinates: 53°22′42″N 16°53′23″E
- Country: Poland
- Voivodeship: Greater Poland
- County: Złotów
- Gmina: Tarnówka
- Population: 212

Piecewo [pjɛˈt͡sɛvɔ] is a village in the administrative district of Gmina Tarnówka, within Złotów County, Greater Poland Voivodeship, in west-central Poland.

Before 1772 the area was part of Kingdom of Poland, 1772–1945, Prussia and Germany. For more on its history, see Złotów County.
