= Tarnowski Młyn, Złotów County =

Tarnowski Młyn
- Settlement
- Location within Poland
- Coordinates: 53°20′38″N 16°49′40″E
- Country: Poland
- Voivodeship: Greater Poland
- County: Złotów
- Gmina: Tarnówka
- Time zone: UTC+1 (CET)
  - Summer (DST): UTC+2 (CEST)
- Vehicle registration: PZL

Tarnowski Młyn [tarˈnɔfski ˈmwɨn] is a settlement in the administrative district of Gmina Tarnówka, within Złotów County, Greater Poland Voivodeship, in north-central Poland.

== History ==
The territory became a part of the emerging Polish state under its first historic ruler Mieszko I in the 10th century. Tarnowski Młyn was a royal village of the Kingdom of Poland, administratively located in the Nakło County in the Kalisz Voivodeship in the Greater Poland Province. It was annexed by Prussia in the First Partition of Poland in 1772, and from 1871 to 1945 it was also part of Germany.
