= Śmiardowo Złotowskie =

- Village
- Location within Poland
- Coordinates: 53°22′N 17°9′E
- Country: Poland
- Voivodeship: Greater Poland
- County: Złotów
- Gmina: Zakrzewo
- Population: 240

Śmiardowo Złotowskie [ɕmjarˈdɔvɔ zwɔˈtɔfskʲɛ] is a village in the administrative district of Gmina Zakrzewo, within Złotów County, Greater Poland Voivodeship, in west-central Poland.

For more on its history, see Złotów County.
