= Grodno, Greater Poland Voivodeship =

Grodno
- Village
- Location within Poland
- Coordinates: 53°30′11″N 16°59′44″E
- Country: Poland
- Voivodeship: Greater Poland
- County: Złotów
- Gmina: Złotów

Grodno [ˈɡrɔdnɔ] is a village in the administrative district of Gmina Złotów, within Złotów County, Greater Poland Voivodeship, in west-central Poland.
