= Poborcze =

- Village
- Location within Poland
- Coordinates: 53°26′1″N 17°12′13″E
- Country: Poland
- Voivodeship: Greater Poland
- County: Złotów
- Gmina: Zakrzewo
- Population: 220

Poborcze [pɔˈbɔrt͡ʂɛ] is a village in the administrative district of Gmina Zakrzewo, within Złotów County, Greater Poland Voivodeship, in west-central Poland.

For more on its history, see Złotów County.
