= Bielawa, Greater Poland Voivodeship =

Bielawa
- Village
- Location within Poland
- Coordinates: 53°28′15″N 16°58′42″E
- Country: Poland
- Voivodeship: Greater Poland
- County: Złotów
- Gmina: Złotów
- Population: 110

Bielawa [bjɛˈlava] is a village in the administrative district of Gmina Złotów, within Złotów County, Greater Poland Voivodeship, in west-central Poland.
