= Stare Dzierząźno =

- Village
- Location within Poland
- Coordinates: 53°24′47″N 17°02′41″E
- Country: Poland
- Voivodeship: Greater Poland
- County: Złotów
- Gmina: Złotów
- Population: 120

Stare Dzierząźno [ˈstarɛ d͡ʑɛˈʐɔ̃ʑnɔ] is a village in the administrative district of Gmina Złotów, within Złotów County, Greater Poland Voivodeship, in west-central Poland.
