= Gmina Zakrzewo, Greater Poland Voivodeship =

Gmina Zakrzewo Zakrzewo Commune
- Gmina
- Coat of arms
- Interactive map of Gmina Zakrzewo
- Coordinates (Zakrzewo): 53°24′39″N 17°9′18″E
- Country: Poland
- Voivodeship: Greater Poland
- County: Złotów
- Seat: Zakrzewo

Area
  - Total: 162.52 km^{2} (62.75 sq mi)

Population (2006)
  - Total: 4,810
  - Density: 29.6/km^{2} (76.7/sq mi)
- Website: http://www.zakrzewo.org.pl

Gmina Zakrzewo is a rural gmina (administrative district) in Złotów County, Greater Poland Voivodeship, in west-central Poland. Its seat is the village of Zakrzewo, which lies approximately 10 kilometres (6 mi) north-east of Złotów and 114 km (71 mi) north of the regional capital Poznań.

The gmina covers an area of 162.52 square kilometres (62.7 sq mi), and as of 2006 its total population is 4,810.

== Villages ==
Gmina Zakrzewo contains the villages and settlements of Czernice, Drożyska Małe, Drożyska Średnie, Drożyska Wielkie, Głomsk, Karolewo, Kujan, Kujanki, Łączyn, Ługi, Nowa Wiśniewka, Nowe Zakrzewo, Nowy Głomsk, Osowiec, Poborcze, Prochy, Śmiardowo Złotowskie, Stara Wiśniewka, Stawnicki Młyn, Wersk, Wierzchołek and Zakrzewo.

== Neighbouring gminas ==
Gmina Zakrzewo is bordered by the gminas of Lipka, Więcbork and Złotów.
