= Ernst Ottwalt =

German writer and playwright

Ernst Ottwalt (13 November 1901 – 24 August 1943) was the pen name of German writer and playwright Ernst Gottwalt Nicolas. A communist, he fled Nazi Germany in 1934 and went into exile in the Soviet Union, where he fell victim to the Great Purge and died in a Soviet gulag. Later, when the Allies of World War II prosecuted Nazi war criminals in the Nuremberg Trials, the chief prosecutor from the Soviet Union quoted from an anti-Nazi book by Ottwalt.

== Biography ==
Ottwalt was born Ernst Gottwalt Nicolas in Zippnow, today Sypniewo, in the district of Deutsch Krone in the former West Prussia. He was baptized Lutheran in Zippnow on 16 March 1902. He attended secondary school in Halle, Saxony-Anhalt, finishing 15 September 1920. He studied at the universities of Halle and Jena. After the First World War, he joined the German nationalist Freikorps, but then changed his political views, becoming a communist and joined the Communist Party (Kommunistische Partei Deutschlands, or KPD) and the Association of Proletarian-Revolutionary Authors (BPRS). He described his Freikorps experiences in his 1929 novel Ruhe und Ordnung.

In November 1930, Friedrich Neubauer staged his play Jeden Tag vier, about a mine disaster in Neurode in Silesia, at the Piscator Bühne. In 1931, he wrote the courtroom novel Denn sie wissen was sie tun, in which Ottwalt portrayed the social structure of the German judiciary. Kurt Tucholsky wrote, "The career of an average German lawyer is portrayed through the means of an early naturalistic novel." The script has since been lost. He collaborated with Bertolt Brecht to write the screenplay for the 1932 film Kuhle Wampe.

A year later, in 1932, his Deutschland erwache! Geschichte des Nationalsozialismus appeared, an early study of the danger of the Nazi movement. When the May 1933 Nazi book burnings took place, Ottwalt's works were on Wolfgang Herrmann's blacklist. In addition, his name was marked with an "x", identifying him as one of the "real vermin", along with Lion Feuchtwanger, Ernst Glaeser, Arthur Holitscher, Alfred Kerr, Egon Erwin Kisch, Emil Ludwig, Heinrich Mann, Theodor Plivier, E.M. Remarque, Kurt Tucholsky and Arnold Zweig, who were to be "stamped out of bookstores". (Note: The brochure Lest, was die Nazis vor 70 Jahren verbrannten! – Titel-Verzeichnis lieferbarer Bücher „verbrannter Dichter” has no date on it, but an article about the program, the brochure and the Frankfurt Book Fair names the 70th anniversary, May 10, 2003 as the date for the program and speaks of a week-long Woche der verbrannten Bücher with readings and exhibits.)

Ottwalt wrote a radio play called "Kalifornische Ballade" with Hanns Eisler in 1932. The original broadcast was in 1934 on Flemish radio, with Ernst Busch singing Eisler's songs. The first German broadcast of the play was on East German radio in 1968. It was performed again at East Berlin's Maxim Gorky Theater in May 1970. An early radio play, it tells the story of Johann August Sutter, a Swiss who emigrated to America in the 19th century.

In 1933, Ottwalt and his wife, Waltraut, left Germany and went into exile in Denmark, then, by way of Czechoslovakia, ended up in the Soviet Union. Living in Moscow, Ottwalt wrote for the German exile magazine Internationale Literatur (published by Johannes R. Becher) and was an editor at Vegaar Bibliothek. He also wrote for the Deutsche Zentral Zeitung. In 1936, he and his wife were ensnared in the Stalinist purges and arrested by the Soviet secret police, the NKVD. He was charged with suspicion of espionage, sentenced to forced labor and deported to a gulag near Archangelsk. His wife was sentenced to forced labor in Kotlas. She was deported back to Germany in January 1941 and didn't learn about his death until January 1958, when the Soviet Red Cross informed her that her husband had died on 24 August 1943.

== Legacy ==
After the Second World War, Ottwalt's name was forgotten, though it came up during the Nuremberg Trials. Despite the fact that Ottwalt had been condemned to a gulag and had perished there, the Soviet chief prosecutor quoted from Deutschland erwache! during the trial. A 1974 German encyclopedic dictionary had a listing for him, but no date of death and in the place of death was a question mark.

His Deutschland erwache! ("Germany, wake up!") was later praised as "a brilliant analysis" that grasped the situation before the Nazis seized power.

Ottwalt's papers are archived in the German National Library Exile Archive in Frankfurt. The documents include poems, sonnets, manuscripts and correspondence between his widow and Lion Feuchtwanger, Wieland Herzfelde, Susanne Leonhard, Erwin Piscator and Wilhelm Sternfeld.

== Works (selected list) ==
Ottwalt's book, "Deutschland erwache!" was one of the earliest analyses of the rise of Nazism.

- Ruhe und Ordnung, novel about the life of nationalist-minded youth. Berlin: Malik-Verlag (1929) (in German)
- Denn sie wissen was sie tun, German courtroom novel. Berlin: Malik-Verlag, (1931) (in German)
- Deutschland erwache!, analysis of Nazism. Vienna and Leipzig: Hess (1932) (in German)
- Kalifornische Ballade, radio play written with Hanns Eisler (1932) (in German)

== Sources ==
- Andreas W. Mytze, Ottwalt. Leben und Werk des vergessenen revolutionären Schriftstellers, Verlag europäische Ideen, Berlin (1977) (in German)
- Jürgen Serke, Die verbrannten Dichter. Lebensgeschichten und Dokumente. Weinheim (1992), p. 338–342 (in German)
- Volker Weidermann, Das Buch der verbrannten Bücher, Verlag Kiepenheuer & Witsch, Cologne (2008), p. 148–151. ISBN 978-3-462-03962-7 (in German)
