= Zakrzewo, Złotów County =

Zakrzewo
- Village
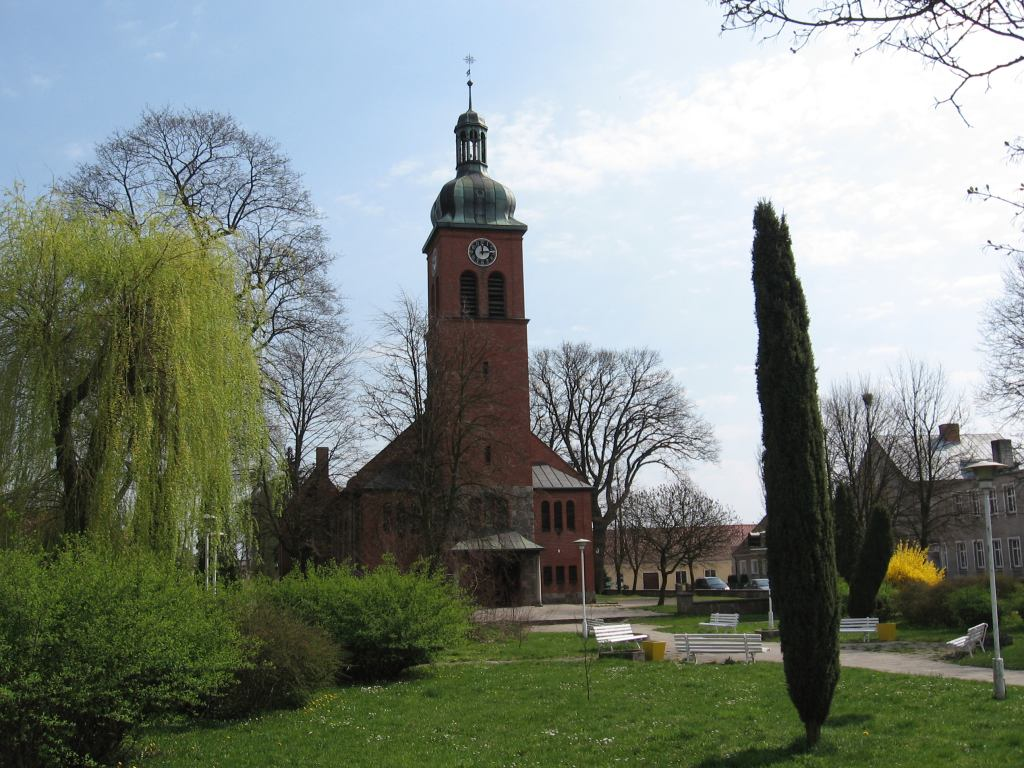
- Church of Saint Mary Magdalene

- Location within Poland
- Coordinates: 53°24′39″N 17°9′18″E
- Country: Poland
- Voivodeship: Greater Poland
- County: Złotów
- Gmina: Zakrzewo

Population
  - Total: 1,620
- Time zone: UTC+1 (CET)
  - Summer (DST): UTC+2 (CEST)
- Vehicle registration: PZL

Zakrzewo ([zaˈkʂɛvɔ]) (German: Buschdorf) is a village in Złotów County, Greater Poland Voivodeship, in north-central Poland. It is the seat of the gmina (administrative district) called Gmina Zakrzewo.

A Blues Express festival is organized in Zakrzewo every July by the local culture centre.

== History ==
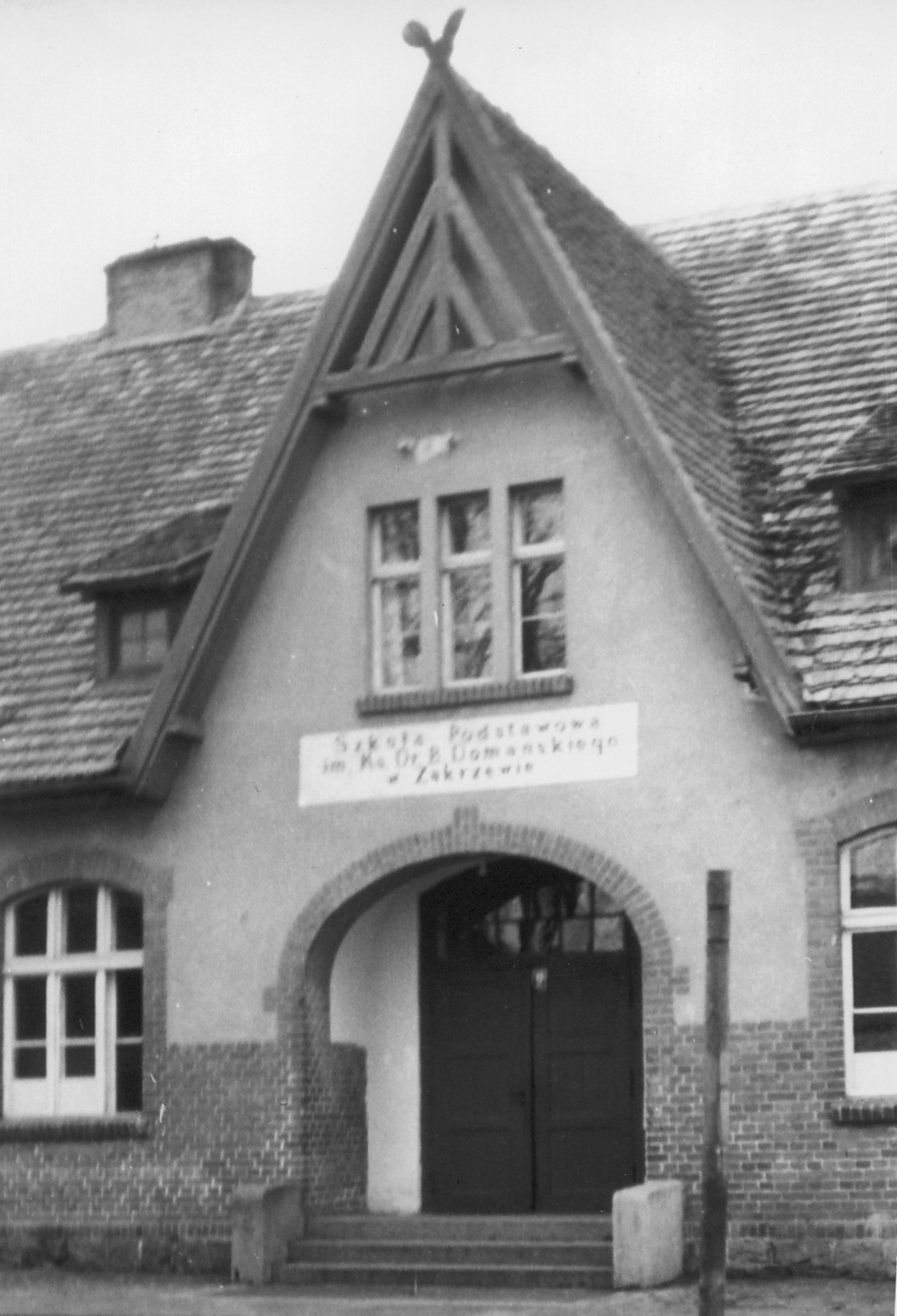
Bolesław Domański Primary School in 1969

The territory became a part of the emerging Polish state under its first historic ruler Mieszko I in the 10th century. Zakrzewo was a private village of Polish nobility, administratively located in the Nakło County in the Kalisz Voivodeship in the Greater Poland Province. It was annexed by Prussia in the First Partition of Poland in 1772, and from 1871 it was also part of Germany. According to the census of 1900, Zakrzewo had a population of 1,124, of which 78.1% were Poles. Zakrzewo had a very strong and active Polish community, headed by the parson of a local parish, Bolesław Domański. A Polish elementary school, kindergarten and community center were located there. In 1909, the Polish Bank Ludowy was founded in the village.

In 1935, Nazi Germany changed the village's name to Buschdorf in an attempt to erase traces of Polish origin. In 1939, German persecution of Poles intensified. Local Polish activist Marcin Łangowski was expelled, and the local Polish community center was attacked by the Germans. The Polish school and Polish bank continued to resist German harassment, however, the Germans soon arrested local Polish teachers and the chairman of the local Polish bank's governance board, who were afterwards deported to concentration camps. After Germany's defeat in World War II, in 1945, the village became again part of Poland and its historic name was restored.

== Transport ==
There is a train station in Zakrzewo, and the voivodeship road 188 runs through the village.

== Sports ==
The local football club is Jedność Zakrzewo. It competes in the lower leagues.

== Notable residents ==
- Johannes Block (1894–1945), Wehrmacht general
