= Gmina Złotów =

Gmina Złotów Złotów Commune
- Gmina
- Coat of arms
- Interactive map of Gmina Złotów
- Coordinates (Złotów): 53°21′37″N 17°2′27″E
- Country: Poland
- Voivodeship: Greater Poland
- County: Złotów
- Seat: Złotów

Area
  - Total: 292.5 km^{2} (112.9 sq mi)

Population (2006)
  - Total: 9,052
  - Density: 30.95/km^{2} (80.15/sq mi)
- Website: http://www.gminazlotow.pl

Gmina Złotów is a rural gmina (administrative district) in Złotów County, Greater Poland Voivodeship, in west-central Poland. Its seat is the town of Złotów, although the town is not part of the territory of the gmina.

The gmina covers an area of 292.5 square kilometres (112.9 sq mi), and as of 2006 its total population is 9,052.

== Villages ==
Gmina Złotów contains the villages and settlements of Bielawa, Blękwit, Bługowiec, Bługowo, Buntowo, Dzierzążenko, Franciszkowo, Gajek, Górzna, Grodno, Józefowo, Kaczochy, Kamień, Kleszczyna, Kleszczynka, Klukowo, Kobylnik, Krzywa Wieś, Krzywa Wieś-Leśniczówka, Łopienko, Międzybłocie, Nowa Kleszczyna, Nowa Święta, Nowa Święta-Leśniczówka, Nowa Święta-Osada, Nowiny, Nowiny-Osada, Nowy Dwór, Pieczyn, Pieczynek, Płosków, Radawnica, Rosochy, Rudna, Skic, Sławianówko, Sławianowo, Stare Dzierząźno, Stawnica, Stawno, Święta, Wąsosz, Wielatowo and Zalesie.

== Neighbouring gminas ==
Gmina Złotów is bordered by the town of Złotów and by the gminas of Jastrowie, Krajenka, Lipka, Łobżenica, Okonek, Tarnówka, Więcbork, Wysoka and Zakrzewo.
