= Krępsko, Złotów County =

Krępsko
- Village
- Location within Poland
- Coordinates: 53°01′37″N 16°23′15″E
- Country: Poland
- Voivodeship: Greater Poland
- County: Złotów
- Gmina: Jastrowie

Krępsko [ˈkrɛmpskɔ] is a village in the administrative district of Gmina Jastrowie, within Złotów County, Greater Poland Voivodeship, in west-central Poland.
