= Deutsche Zentral-Zeitung =

German newspaper

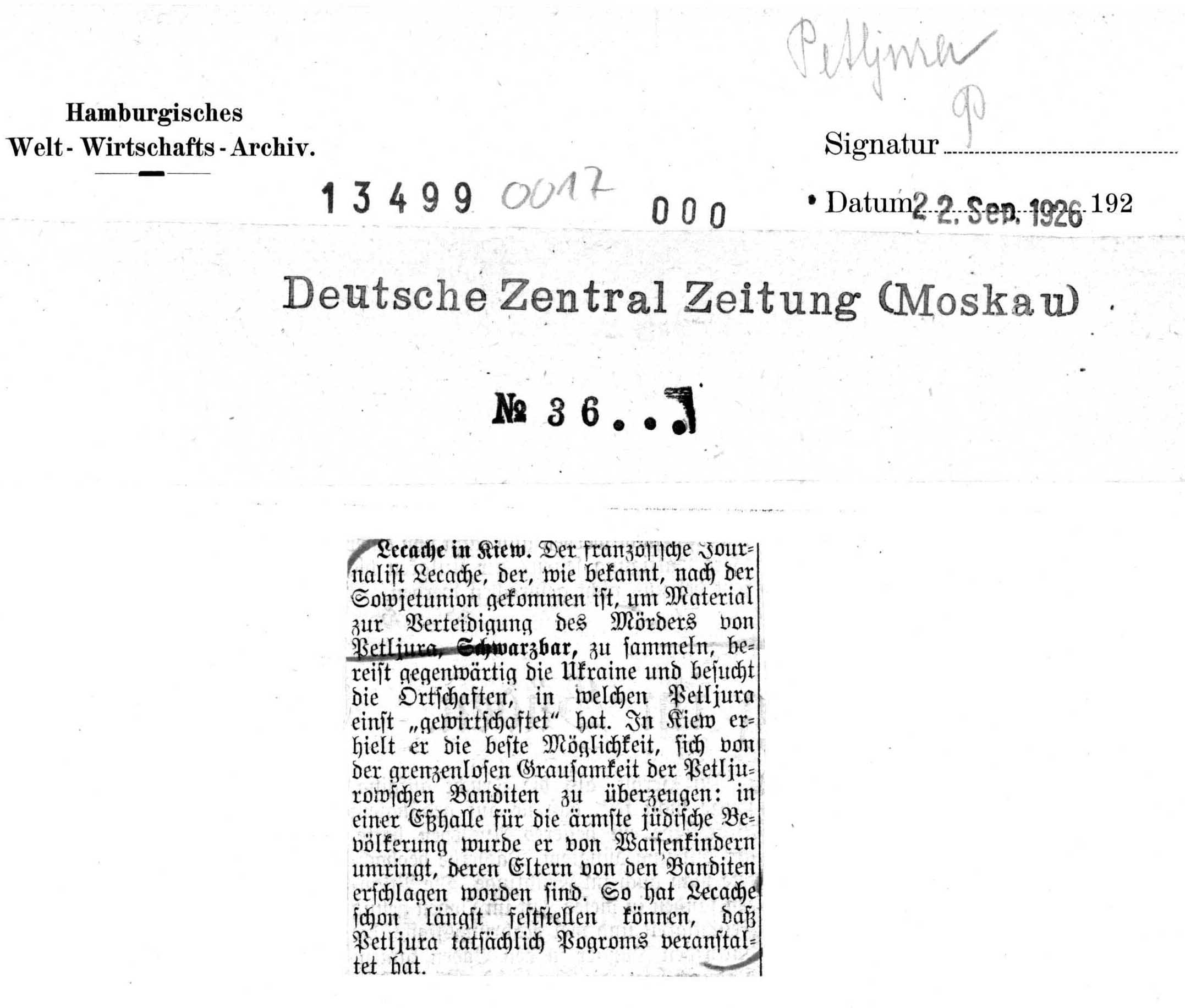
- Clipping of a DZZ article from 22 September 1926
- Type: German-language newspaper
- Format: Broadsheet
- Publisher: German section of the Communist International
- Editor: Julia Annenkova (1934–1937), Karl Hoffmann, Karl Filippovich Kurshner
- Staff writers: political exiles from Germany, Austria, Switzerland and France
- Founded: 1925
- Ceased publication: 1939
- Political alignment: Communist
- Headquarters: Moscow, Soviet Union

The Deutsche Zentral-Zeitung (DZZ; German Central Newspaper) was the German-language newspaper published in Moscow by the German-speaking section of the Communist International. The newspaper's type was set in Fraktur (see image) and contained translations of Russian articles and speeches, reviews, articles from and about other countries, and it publicized pronouncements and information from the Communist Party. Published for little over a decade, the newspaper ceased publication in 1939 after Soviet secret police (NKVD) arrested so many of the staff that it no longer had enough people to continue operation. The newspaper remained without a successor until 1957.

== History ==
The large number of Germans living in the Soviet Union supported many publications in the German language in the 1930s. With the growing pressures of a growing police state, a number of German-language publications closed, leaving fewer than two dozen. The Deutsche Zentral-Zeitung (DZZ) was founded in 1925. It was published in Moscow from 1926 to mid-1939 and was the Communist Party organ, "equivalent to Pravda". It published speeches by Joseph Stalin, Vyacheslav Molotov and other top Soviet officials, government pronouncements and German translations of important articles from Pravda, the newspaper of the Soviet Communist Party. Articles detailed the accomplishments of the Soviet Union in agriculture and industry, advancements in technology and aviation. There were also early reports about Nazi concentration camps, such as the articles written by Willi Bredel on 10 September 1934 and 27 October 1934 about his own experiences as a prisoner in Fuhlsbüttel and by Werner Hirsch, also in October 1934, of his confinement at several camps. In December 1935, the DZZ published reports from the Rote Hilfe about Sachsenburg concentration camp, with specific information about names and numbers, including how many prisoners there were in different categories.

The staff was composed of political exiles from Germany, Austria, Switzerland and France. Many German political exiles wrote articles for the DZZ, including Herbert Wehner, who wrote under his cadre name of "Kurt Funk"; and Hans Knodt, the temporary editor of the Rote Fahne, the newspaper of the Communist Party of Germany. (Note: Knodt wrote under his cadre name "Ander".) Journalist Gustav Regler wrote articles as a special correspondent from Spain. Other writers included German workers who emigrated to the Soviet Union for work, rather than political reasons and non-Germans, such as William L. Patterson, who wrote an article about Paul Robeson in 1936. There were also reviews, such as the one by Hugo Huppert of a Bertolt Brecht novel on 29 June 1936.

== The purges ==
As the Great Purge heated up, on 9 August 1936, the DZZ followed the Soviet press in its drumbeat against "enemy infiltrators". While the show trials were taking place, the DZZ published pages of transcripts of the proceedings, however there were no reports of the outcomes of the trials though many hundreds of German-speakers were arrested, imprisoned and executed. (Note: In 1936, there were 1,116 people sentenced to death; in 1937, there were 353,680. Between 1937 and 1938, the purges were so massive, that at one point, in the space of a few days, over a thousand people were shot in Moscow alone. Paul Jäkel, a KPD functionary, estimated that in April 1938 alone, more than 70 percent of the KPD members exiled in the Soviet Union were arrested. In his book Bloodlands, Timothy Snyder gives the figure of 681,692 executions carried out for political crimes in 1937 and 1938 in the Soviet Union, in what he terms the Great Terror.) The DZZ itself, because of its non-Russian and international staff, largely intellectual, artistic and often politically active, became a particular target of the Great Purge, although other German-language publications and the press in general were targets. The NKVD arrested a number of the editorial staff in February 1938, returning several times to arrest others, finally having more than 40 members of the staff in custody, leaving an insufficient number of people—seven—who could write and translate into German. There was a new editor-in-chief, Karl Hoffmann, who, as a defensive measure, made the editorial staff live at the DZZ offices and were not allowed to leave. Hoffmann himself nonetheless came under threat from the NKVD. At that point, the DZZ and other publications were printed by Izvestia, but the system was precarious. Censors oversaw publication, but sometimes refused to meet their deadline, putting the editor and staff at risk of arrest in the event of publication, or causing the newspaper to miss its printing schedule and be issued late. More staff were hired, but they were inadequate to the task, possessing only moderate German skills, unable to write and unschooled in journalism. The DZZ ceased publication in summer 1939.

Julia Annenkova, who was close to Stalin, was editor in chief from 1934 to June 1937. Annenkova was arrested in connection with the anti-Comintern bloc. Others connected with the DZZ who were arrested in the Great Purge include Wehner, Maria Osten, Mikhail Koltsov, Ernst Ottwalt, Hermann, Richter, Stürmann, Franz Falk, an editor and Karl Filippovich Kurshner, an editor-in-chief, and Knodt, who was arrested in December 1940, and perished in a gulag.

After the DZZ stopped publishing, nothing replaced it until 1957, when Neues Leben (New Life) appeared. Many German libraries have microfilm copies of the DZZ, either in part or in whole.

== Sample article ==
A clipping from 22 September 1926 (see image) gives an example of the nature and tone of DZZ articles. The article is titled, "Lecache in Kiev". It reads, "The French journalist Lecache, who, as is known, has come to the Soviet Union to gather material to defend Schwartzbard, the murderer of Petliura, is currently traveling in the Ukraine and visiting the locales in which Petliura once "kept house". In Kiev, he obtained the best possibility to convince himself of the boundless brutality of the Petliurian bandits: in a dining hall for the poorest Jewish populace, he was surrounded by orphans, whose parents were slain by the bandits. Thus, Lecache was finally able to ascertain that Petliura actually had organized pogroms."

== Sources ==
- Sabrina Dorlin, "Histoire culturelle des Allemands au Kazakhstan de la Seconde Guerre mondiale à nos jours : des efforts d’enracinement aux perspectives de retour" (Doctoral dissertation) Université Lumière Lyon 2 (19 September 2003) (in French)
