= Głomsk =

- Village
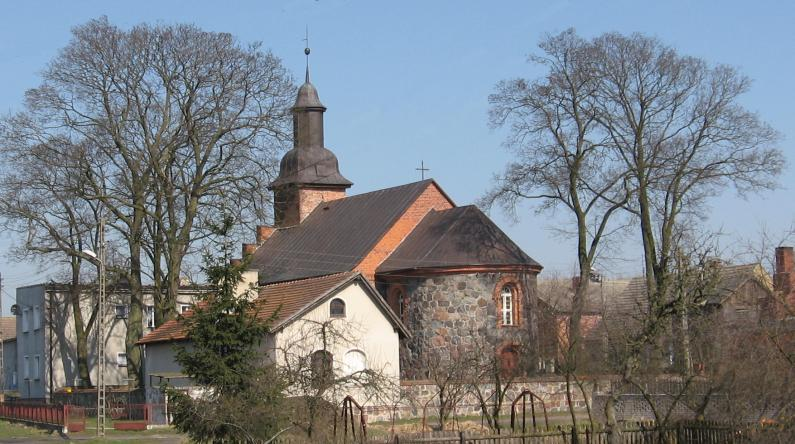
- Church of Saint Michael Archangel

- Location within Poland
- Coordinates: 53°26′N 17°10′E
- Country: Poland
- Voivodeship: Greater Poland
- County: Złotów
- Gmina: Zakrzewo

Population
  - Total: 500
- Time zone: UTC+1 (CET)
  - Summer (DST): UTC+2 (CEST)
- Vehicle registration: PZL

Głomsk [ɡwɔmsk] is a village in the administrative district of Gmina Zakrzewo, within Złotów County, Greater Poland Voivodeship, in north-central Poland.

== History ==
The territory became a part of the emerging Polish state under its first historic ruler Mieszko I in the 10th century. Głomsk was a private village of Polish nobility, including the Potulicki, Grudziński and Działyński families, administratively located in the Nakło County in the Kalisz Voivodeship in the Greater Poland Province. It was annexed by Prussia in the First Partition of Poland in 1772, and from 1871 it was also part of Germany. In 1939, the Germans carried out arrests of local Polish teachers, who were afterwards executed (see Nazi crimes against the Polish nation). After Germany's defeat in World War II, in 1945, the village was restored to Poland.
