= Nowa Święta =

- Village
- Location within Poland
- Coordinates: 53°21′N 17°8′E
- Country: Poland
- Voivodeship: Greater Poland
- County: Złotów
- Gmina: Złotów
- Population: 400

Nowa Święta (Polish pronunciation: [ˈnɔva ˈɕfjɛnta]) is a village in the administrative district of Gmina Złotów, within Złotów County, Greater Poland Voivodeship, in west-central Poland.
