= Gmina Tarnówka =

Gmina Tarnówka Tarnówka Commune
- Gmina
- Coat of arms
- Interactive map of Gmina Tarnówka
- Coordinates (Tarnówka): 53°20′24″N 16°51′1″E
- Country: Poland
- Voivodeship: Greater Poland
- County: Złotów
- Seat: Tarnówka

Area
  - Total: 132.23 km^{2} (51.05 sq mi)

Population (2006)
  - Total: 3,095
  - Density: 23.41/km^{2} (60.62/sq mi)
- Website: http://www.tarnowka.pl

Gmina Tarnówka is a rural gmina (administrative district) in Złotów County, Greater Poland Voivodeship, in west-central Poland. Its seat is the village of Tarnówka, which lies approximately 13 kilometres (8 mi) west of Złotów and 105 km (65 mi) north of the regional capital Poznań.

The gmina covers an area of 132.23 square kilometres (51.1 sq mi), and as of 2006 its total population is 3,095.

== Villages ==
Gmina Tarnówka contains the villages and settlements of Annopole, Bartoszkowo, Osówka, Piecewo, Plecemin, Płytnica, Pomiarki, Ptusza, Sokolna, Tarnowiec, Tarnowiec-Elektrownia, Tarnówka, Tarnowski Młyn and Węgierce.

== Neighbouring gminas ==
Gmina Tarnówka is bordered by the gminas of Jastrowie, Krajenka, Szydłowo and Złotów.
