= Gmina Jastrowie =

Gmina Jastrowie Jastrowie Commune
- Gmina
- Coat of arms
- Interactive map of Gmina Jastrowie
- Coordinates (Jastrowie): 53°25′18″N 16°48′56″E
- Country: Poland
- Voivodeship: Greater Poland
- County: Złotów
- Seat: Jastrowie

Area
  - Total: 353.4 km^{2} (136.4 sq mi)

Population (2006)
  - Total: 11,401
  - Density: 32.26/km^{2} (83.56/sq mi)
  - Urban: 8,403
  - Rural: 2,998
- Website: http://www.jastrowie.pl/

Gmina Jastrowie is an urban-rural gmina (administrative district) in Złotów County, Greater Poland Voivodeship, in west-central Poland. Its seat is the town of Jastrowie, which lies approximately 17 kilometres (11 mi) north-west of Złotów and 114 km (71 mi) north of the regional capital Poznań.

The gmina covers an area of 353.4 square kilometres (136.4 sq mi), and as of 2006 its total population is 11,401 (out of which the population of Jastrowie amounts to 8,403, and the population of the rural part of the gmina is 2,998).

== Villages ==
Apart from the town of Jastrowie, Gmina Jastrowie contains the villages and settlements of Brzeźnica, Brzeźnica-Kolonia, Budy, Budy-Folwark, Drzewiec, Krępsko, Nadarzyce, Piaski-Leśniczówka, Samborsko, Sypniewko, Sypniewko-Folwark, Sypniewo, Sypniewo-Kolonia and Trzebieszki.

== Neighbouring gminas ==
Gmina Jastrowie is bordered by the gminas of Borne Sulinowo, Czaplinek, Okonek, Szydłowo, Tarnówka, Wałcz and Złotów.
