= Jastrowie =

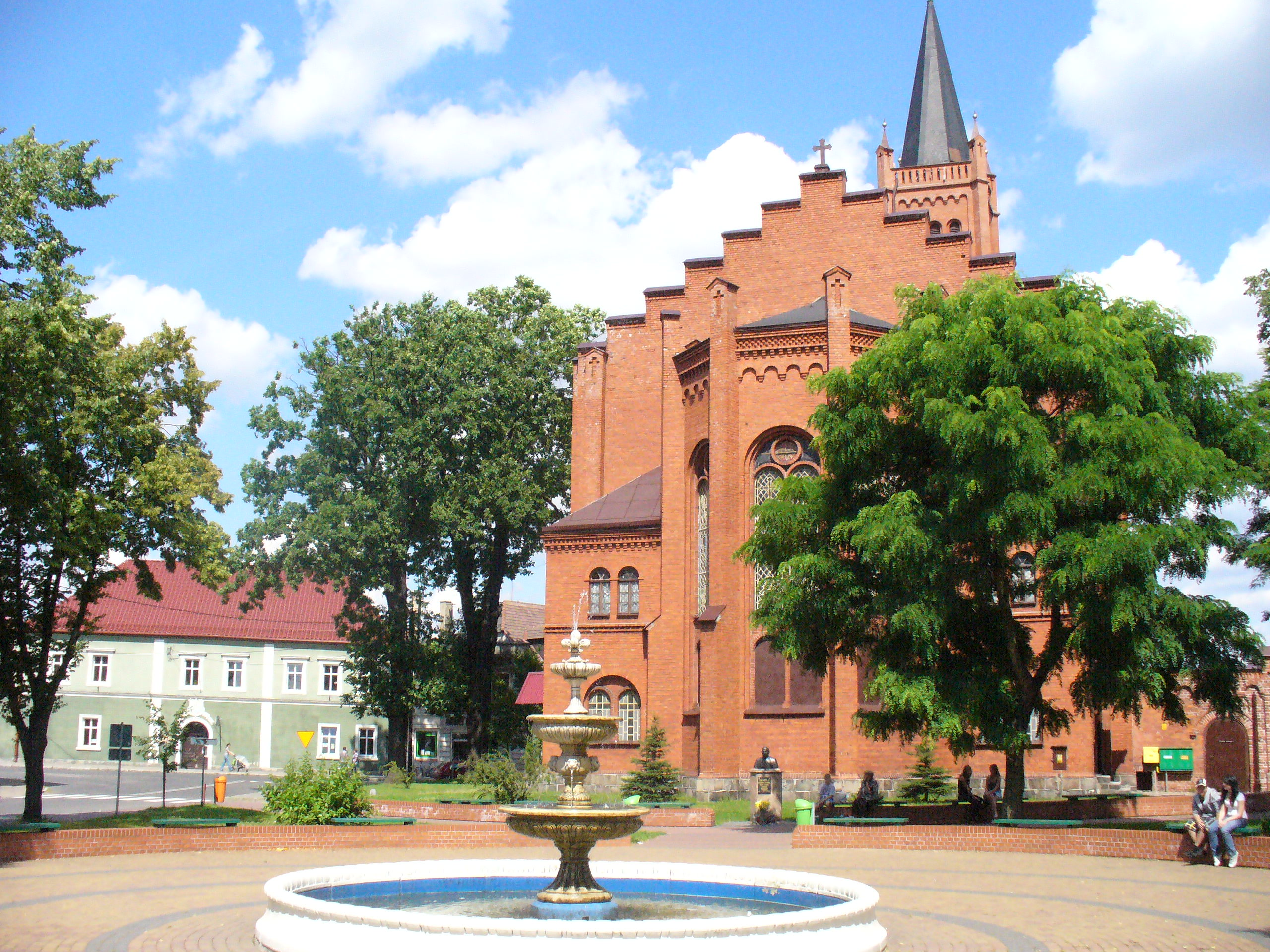
- Church of the Holiest Virgin Mary, the Queen of Poland

- Flag Coat of arms

- Location within Poland
- Coordinates: 53°25′18″N 16°48′56″E
- Country: Poland
- Voivodeship: Greater Poland
- County: Złotów
- Gmina: Jastrowie
- First mentioned: 1363
- Town rights: 1602

Area
  - Total: 72.27 km^{2} (27.90 sq mi)

Population (2006)
  - Total: 8,403
  - Density: 116.3/km^{2} (301.1/sq mi)
- Time zone: UTC+1 (CET)
  - Summer (DST): UTC+2 (CEST)
- Postal code: 64-915
- Vehicle registration: PZL
- Website: http://www.jastrowie.pl

Jastrowie [jasˈtrɔvʲɛ] (German: Jastrow) is a town in northwestern Poland in Złotów County, Greater Poland Voivodeship. It has 8,900 inhabitants (1998) and lies on the edge of the Gwda River valley. The town is located on the Osoka stream.

== History ==
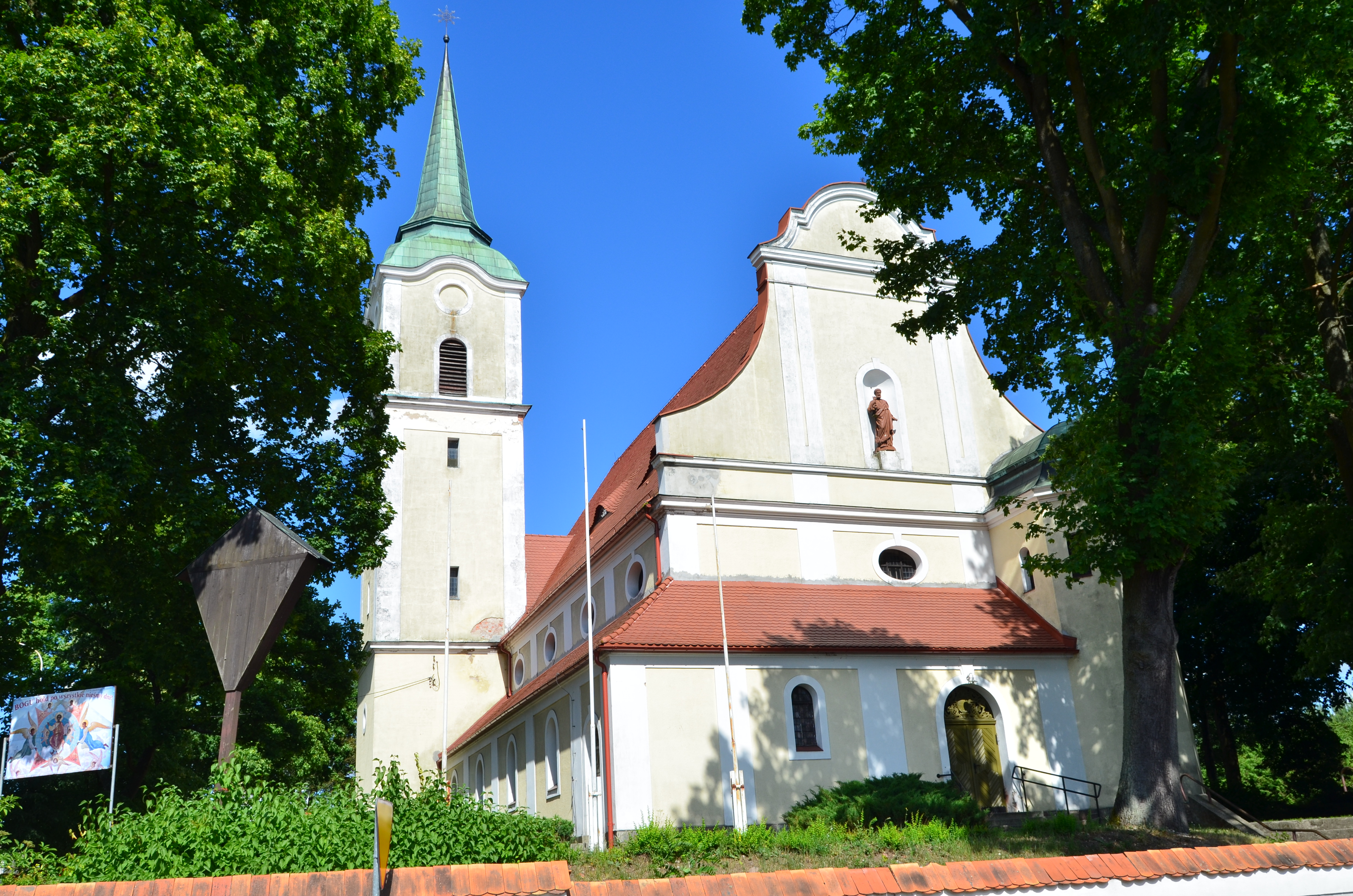
Saint Michael Archangel church

Jastrowie was one of the southernmost centres of the Pomeranians. The territory became a part of the emerging Polish state under its first historical ruler, Mieszko I, in the 10th century. At the beginning of the 14th century, it belonged to the Ujście castellany. Jastrowie was a royal village of the Kingdom of Poland, administratively located in the Poznań County in the Poznań Voivodeship in the Greater Poland Province. On May 5, 1602, Jastrowie received the town rights granted by Piotr Potulicki and confirmed by King Sigismund III Vasa.

Protestantism was introduced in 1587 when the Catholic pastor converted, and in 1600, the old church was demolished and replaced by a new building. However, the Protestants could only keep the former Catholic parish church until 1619 because that year, the preacher Martin Goldbach converted to Catholicism, after which the church was returned to the Catholics.

In the 17th century, the town developed quickly. New settlers arrived, including Germans from Pomerania, Scots and Jews.

The religious struggle in Jastrowie reached its climax in 1768 when soldiers belonging to the Polish nobleman Roskowski killed the Lutheran preacher Willich.

After the First Partition of Poland, the town was annexed by Prussia. For the time being, the Lutherans went to the church services in the neighboring Pomeranian villages of Zamborst and Flederborn, but later - after 1773 - got their church with the support of the Prussian government. One of the main escape routes for surviving insurgents of the Polish November Uprising (1830-31) from partitioned Poland to the Great Emigration led through the town.

In the 19th century, Jastrowie, then officially called Jastrow in German, became one of the most important centres of horse trade. During World War II, the Germans operated a forced labour subcamp of the Stalag II-B prisoner-of-war camp for Allied POWs in the town. The Polish resistance conducted espionage on German activity in the town. During the war, the town was an important point of the Pomeranian Wall, one of the most important German lines of fortification in the East. Polish troops eventually captured the town on 2 February 1945 and then restored to Poland.

Currently, Jastrowie is the site of several wood and bicycle factories. It was part of the Piła Voivodeship from 1975 until 1998 when the Greater Poland Voivodeship superseded the administrative region. Jastrowie's most important cultural event is its International Folk Festival, "Bukowińskie Spotkania".

== Sites of interest ==
- Town Market (18th century)
- Old Town Hall (16th century)
- St. Mary's Queen of Poland Church (1882)
- Michael's Archangel Church (1913)
- Monument to Polish soldiers fallen in the Battle of Jastrowie in 1945
- Old townhouses and timber-framed houses

== Sports ==
The local football club is Polonia Jastrowie. It competes in the lower leagues.
