= Złotów County =

Złotów County Powiat złotowski
- County
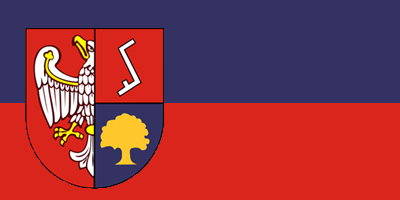
- Flag Coat of arms

- Location within the voivodeship
- Coordinates (Złotów): 53°21′37″N 17°2′27″E
- Country: Poland
- Voivodeship: Greater Poland
- Seat: Złotów
- Gminas: Total 8 (incl. 1 urban): Złotów; Gmina Jastrowie; Gmina Krajenka; Gmina Lipka; Gmina Okonek; Gmina Tarnówka; Gmina Zakrzewo; Gmina Złotów

Area
  - Total: 1,660 km^{2} (640 sq mi)

Population (2011)
  - Total: 68,791
  - Density: 41.4/km^{2} (107/sq mi)
  - Urban: 34,302
  - Rural: 34,489
- Car plates: PZL
- Website: www.zlotow-powiat.pl

Złotów County (Polish: powiat złotowski) is a unit of territorial administration and local government (powiat) in Greater Poland Voivodeship, west-central Poland. Its administrative seat and largest town is Złotów, which lies 107 kilometres (66 mi) north of the regional capital Poznań. The county contains three other towns: Jastrowie, 17 km (11 mi) northwest of Złotów, Okonek, 23 km (14 mi) northwest of Złotów, and Krajenka, 7 km (4 mi) southwest of Złotów.

The county covers an area of 1,661 square kilometres (641.3 sq mi). As of 2011, its total population is 68,791, out of which the population of Złotów is 18,303, that of Jastrowie is 8,485, that of Okonek is 3,855, that of Krajenka is 3,659, and the rural population is 34,489.

== History ==
For centuries, the area was part of the Kingdom of Poland and the Greater Poland region (often called the "cradle of Poland"), which beginning in the 10th-century formed the heart of the early Polish state. From 1772 to 1945, it was part of Prussia and Germany, contained mainly in the district called Kreis Flatow (Złotów), although parts were in Kreis Deutsch Krone (Jastrowie).

In post-war Poland, Złotów County was in Szczecin Voivodeship from 1946 to 1950, and then in Koszalin Voivodeship until 1975, when the powiats were abolished. From 1975 until 1998, the area was part of Piła Voivodeship. The county was recreated on January 1, 1999, as a result of the Polish local government reforms passed in 1998, which reintroduced the powiats and created sixteen larger voivodeships.

== Neighbouring counties ==
Złotów County is bordered by Szczecinek County to the northwest, Człuchów County to the northeast, Sępólno County to the east, Piła County to the south, and Wałcz County and Drawsko County to the west.

== Administrative divisions ==
The county is subdivided into eight gminas (one urban, three urban-rural and four rural). These are listed in the following table, in descending order of population.

Gmina	Type	Area (km^{2})	Population (2006)	Seat
Złotów	urban	11.6	18,303	
Gmina Jastrowie	urban-rural	353.4	11,549	Jastrowie
Gmina Złotów	rural	292.5	9,307	Złotów *
Gmina Okonek	urban-rural	325.9	8,809	Okonek
Gmina Krajenka	urban-rural	191.8	7,301	Krajenka
Gmina Lipka	rural	191.0	5,557	Lipka
Gmina Zakrzewo	rural	162.5	4,847	Zakrzewo
Gmina Tarnówka	rural	132.2	3,118	Tarnówka
* seat not part of the gmina
