= Czersk (disambiguation) =

Czersk may refer to the following places:

- Czersk, Greater Poland Voivodeship (west-central Poland)
- Czersk, Masovian Voivodeship (east-central Poland)
- Czersk in Pomeranian Voivodeship (north Poland)
