= Herbert Ihlefeld =

German World War II flying ace and wing commander

- Ihlefeld as a Hauptmann
- Born: 1 June 1914; Pinnow, Province of Pomerania, German Empire
- Died: 8 August 1995 (aged 81); Wennigsen, Lower Saxony, Germany
- Burial place: Old cemetery in Kirchheim unter Teck, Baden-Württemberg
- Military career
- Allegiance: Nazi Germany
- Branch: Reichsheer (1933–35); Luftwaffe (1935–45)
- Service years: 1933–1945
- Rank: Oberst (Colonel)
- Units: J/88, LG 2, JG 77, JG 52, JG 103, JG 25, JG 11, JG 1
- Commands: JG 77, JG 52, JG 103, JG 25, JG 11, JG 1
- Conflicts: See battles: Spanish Civil War; World War II Battle of France Battle of Britain Balkan Campaign Battle of Greece Battle of Crete Invasion of Yugoslavia Operation Barbarossa Eastern Front Defense of the Reich Operation Bodenplatte
- Awards: Spanish Cross in Gold with Swords; Knight's Cross of the Iron Cross with Oak Leaves and Swords

Herbert Ihlefeld (1 June 1914 – 8 August 1995) was a German Luftwaffe military aviator during the Spanish Civil War and World War II, a fighter ace listed with 130 enemy aircraft shot down in over 1,000 combat missions. Depending on source, he claimed seven to nine aerial victories in the Spanish Civil War, and during World War II, 67 on the Eastern Front and 56 on the Western Front, including 15 four-engined bombers and 26 Supermarine Spitfires. He survived being shot down eight times during his 1,000 combat missions.

Born in Pinnow, Ihlefeld volunteered for military service in the Reichswehr of Nazi Germany in 1933. (Note: From 1919, Germany's national defense force was known as the Reichswehr. That name was dropped in favor of Wehrmacht on 16 March 1935.) Initially serving in the Heer (Army), he transferred to the Luftwaffe (Air Force) in 1935. Following flight training, he volunteered for service with the Condor Legion during the Spanish Civil War where he was assigned to Jagdgruppe 88 (J/88—88th Fighter Group). From February–July 1938, he claimed nine aerial victories, two remained unconfirmed. For his service in Spain he was awarded the Spanish Cross in Gold with Swords.

Following service in Spain, Ihlefeld was posted to Lehrgeschwader 2 (LG 2—2nd Demonstration Wing. With this unit, he participated in the Invasion of Poland and Battle of France. During the height of the Battle of Britain on 13 September 1940, he was awarded the Knight's Cross of the Iron Cross after 21 aerial victories in World War II. Ihlefeld, who had been appointed Gruppenkommandeur (group commander) of I. Gruppe of Jagdgeschwader 77 (JG 77—77th Fighter Wing) in September 1940, fought in the aerial battles of the Balkan Campaign. During Operation Barbarossa, the German invasion of the Soviet Union, he was awarded the Knight's Cross of the Iron Cross with Oak Leaves on 27 June 1941. Ten months later, following his 101st aerial victory of the war, Ihlefeld was awarded the Knight's Cross of the Iron Cross with Oak Leaves and Swords on 24 April 1942.

On 22 June 1942, Ihlefeld was appointed Geschwaderkommodore (wing commander) of Jagdgeschwader 52 (JG 52—52nd Fighter Wing). He was injured in combat on 22 July 1942 and after convalescence, he was given command of Jagdfliegerschule 3 (3rd Fighter Pilot School). On 21 July 1943, he was tasked with leadership of a high flying de Havilland Mosquito intercept unit called Jagdgeschwader 25 (JG 25—25th Fighter Wing) in Defense of the Reich. This unit failed to achieve its objective and Ihlefeld was assigned to the Stab (headquarters unit) of the 30th Fighter Division. On 20 May 1944, he took command of Jagdgeschwader 1 "Oesau" (JG 1—1st Fighter Wing) and participated in Operation Bodenplatte. Ihlefeld died on 8 August 1995 in Wennigsen, Lower Saxony.

== Early life and career ==
Ihlefeld was born on 1 June 1914 in Pinnow, at the time in the Province of Pomerania, a province of the Kingdom of Prussia, the son of a farm laborer. Following a machinist vocational education, he volunteered for military service in the Reichsheer on 1 April 1933. As a Grenadier, he was first posted to Infanterie-Regiment 5 (5th Infantry Regiment) based in Stettin and in 1934 was posted to the aviation technical school at Jüterbog. In March 1937, he was assigned to the I. Gruppe (1st group) of Jagdgeschwader 132 "Richthofen" (JG 32—132nd Fighter Wing). (Note: For an explanation of Luftwaffe unit designations see Organization of the Luftwaffe during World War II.)

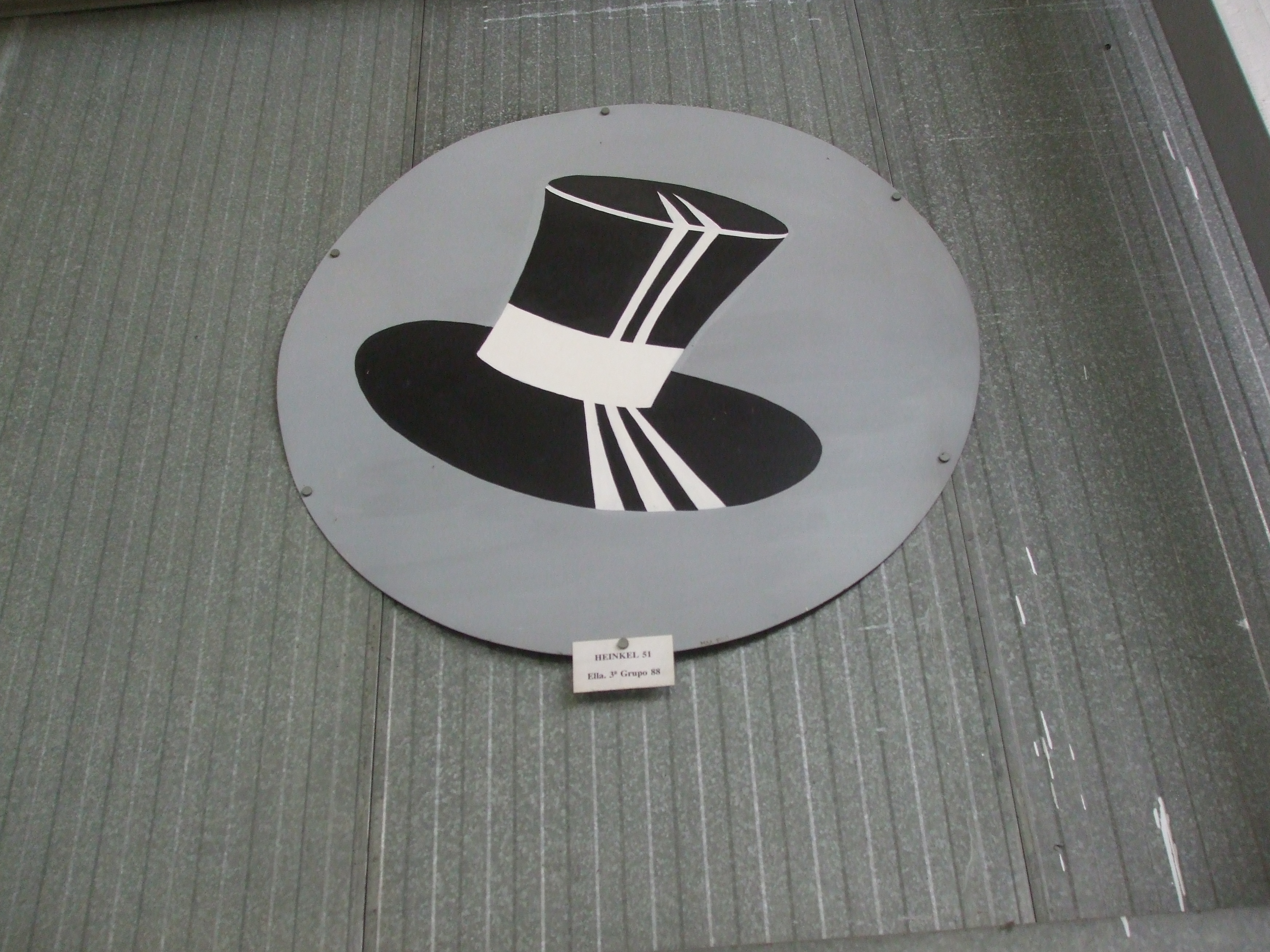
2. Staffel insignia

With the outbreak of the Spanish Civil War in July 1936, Germany supported the Nationalists and asked for volunteers which organized in the Condor Legion (Legion Condor). Unteroffizier (Staff Sergeant) Ihlefeld joined 2. Staffel (2nd squadron) of Jagdgruppe 88 (J/88—88th Fighter Group) in late 1937. Flying with this unit until July 1938, he claimed nine and was credited with seven aerial victories over Spain and was awarded the Spanish Cross in Gold with Swords (Spanienkreuz in Gold mit Schwertern). There, he was issued one of the first Messerschmitt Bf 109 B-1's sent to the Condor Legion. A Polikarpov I-16 fighter aircraft shot down on 21 February 1938 was his first aerial victory of the war. On 13 March 1938, Ihlefeld was credited with his second victory, a Polikarpov I-15 biplane fighter aircraft followed by his third, an I-16, on 11 May 1938. A week later, on 18 May, he claimed another I-16, the victory was unconfirmed. A Tupolev SB-2 bomber from a force attacking La Sénia, shot down on 2 June 1938, became his fifth victim. He claimed another unconfirmed victory on 25 June 1938 over an I-16. On 12 July 1938, he was credited with a victory over an I-15. Two I-15s shot down on 15 July 1938 were his last victories in Spain.

On 1 August 1938, he was assigned to I. (Jäger) Gruppe (I.(J)—1st fighter group) of Lehrgeschwader 2 (LG 2—2nd Demonstration Wing), an operational training unit tasked with the evaluation of new types of aircraft and tactics. The unit was later redesignated to I. Gruppe of Jagdgeschwader 77 (JG 77—77th Fighter Wing). On 20 August 1938, he was promoted to Leutnant (second lieutenant).

== World War II ==
World War II in Europe began on Friday, 1 September 1939, when German forces invaded Poland. Ihlefeld flew his first combat missions over Poland and was awarded the Iron Cross 2nd Class (Eisernes Kreuz zweiter Klasse) on 26 September 1939. On 10 May 1940, the Battle of France, the German invasion of France and the Low Countries, began and Ihlefeld claimed his first victory of the war on 29 May. The combat took place at an altitude of 2,500 meters (8,200 feet) near Saint-Quentin during the Battle of Dunkirk (26 May – 4 June 1940), the defense and evacuation of British and allied forces from France to England, on a combat air patrol. On this mission, 11 Messerschmitt Bf 109s encountered two Armée de l'air (French Air Force) Morane-Saulnier M.S.406 fighter aircraft. Ihlefeld was credited with shooting one of them down at 20:15, the other Morane was credited to Hauptmann (Captain) Hanns Trübenbach. On 30 June, he was credited with two victories over Bristol Blenheim light bombers shot down at 12:45 and 15:30, his second and third of the war. Although Ihlefeld was unhurt, damage to his Bf 109 E sustained in one of these encounters, resulted in a forced landing near Saint-Omer.

Ihlefeld received an early promotion to Oberleutnant (first lieutenant) on 1 June 1940 followed by his appointment to Staffelkapitän (squadron leader) of 2. Staffel in I.(J)/LG 2. (Note: According to Prien, the appointment to Staffelkapitän (squadron leader) of 2. Staffel of I.(J)/LG 2 occurred sometime in June. According to Obermaier, this happened on 1 July.) He was awarded the Iron Cross 1st Class (Eisernes Kreuz erster Klasse) on 4 July 1940. On 9 July, I.(J)/LG 2 was tasked with flying escort fighter missions for Kampfgeschwader 2 (KG 2—2nd Bomber Wing) attacking British shipping in the English Channel. These types of missions were referred to as Kanalkampf by the Germans and resulted in a series of air battles between the Luftwaffe and the British Royal Air Force (RAF). On the third mission of the day (16:25 – 17:20), escorting a flight of Dornier Do 17 bombers to their targets, Ihlefeld claimed his fourth victory of the war, a Hawker Hurricane fighter aircraft shot down at 16:30.

=== Battle of Britain and Channel Front ===
On 10 July 1940, seven RAF bombers attacked the Amiens – Glisy Aerodrome, all of which were shot down by the Luftwaffe. On this day, 47 Do 17 bombers from I. and III. Gruppe of KG 2, supported by one Messerschmitt Bf 110 heavy fighter and two single-engined fighter Gruppen attacked British shipping in the English Channel. In the resulting aerial combat, Luftwaffe pilots initially claimed 23 victories, 10 of these were later confirmed by the Luftwaffe. Actual RAF losses that day were three aircraft shot down, further seven made forced landings and were severely damaged. RAF pilots claimed the destruction of 16 German aircraft, actual losses were four Do 17s and three Bf 110s shot down plus further four damaged aircraft. These events marked the beginning of the Battle of Britain (10 July – 31 October 1940).

On 11 July 1940, I.(J)/LG 2 was ordered to relocate to Jever in northern Germany. In the following four weeks, the Gruppe received a period of rest and the aircraft were given a maintenance overhaul prior to moving back to the Channel Front, to an airfield at Marck, east of Calais, on 8 August. Adolf Hitler had issued Führer Directive no. 17 (Weisung Nr. 17) on 1 August 1940; the strategic objective was to engage and defeat the RAF so as to achieve air superiority in preparation for Operation Sea Lion (Unternehmen Seelöwe), the proposed amphibious invasion of Great Britain. On 13 August 1940, during Operation Eagle Attack (code name Adlertag), I.(J)/LG 2 was tasked with providing fighter escort for Junkers Ju 87 dive bombers from IV. Gruppe of Lehrgeschwader 1 (LG 1—1st Demonstration Wing) and II. Gruppe of Sturzkampfgeschwader 1 (StG 1—1st Dive Bomber Wing), destined to attack the RAF airfields at Rochford and Detling. During this mission (16:25 – 17:35), (Note: All times used in this section are Central European Time unless otherwise noted.) Ihlefeld claimed his fifth victory, a Hurricane. British losses from 16:15 to 16:36 GMT amounted to one Hurricane from No. 43 Squadron whose pilot, Pilot Officer C.A Woods-Scawen bailed out unhurt. Four Hurricanes from No. 56 Squadron were lost—Pilot Officer C.C.O Joubert was slightly wounded, Flying Officer P.F.Mc Davies was badly burned, Flying Officer R.E.P Brooker bailed out unhurt while Sergeant P. Hillwood bailed out and swam 2.5 miles (4.0 kilometers) to shore. The first two men were shot down over Rochfort.

On 22 August 1940, I.(J)/LG 2 flew a combat air patrol over Southern England. Taking his total to seven victories, Ihlefeld had claimed two Supermarine Spitfire fighters shot down in the vicinity of Dover. Five Spitfires were lost by Fighter Command on this day. Weather conditions improved over Southern England on 24 August 1940 and I.(J)/LG 2 was ordered to fly a combat air patrol over Kent. The Gruppe flew three missions that day and claimed ten aerial victories, all of which over Spitfires, two of which were credited to Ihlefeld. Ihlefeld's first victory was claimed at 12:30 and the second at 17:00. Fighter Command lost five Spitfires and one damaged on 24 August. Two losses roughly match Ihlefeld's claim. No. 54 Squadron lost one; Pilot Officer C. Stewart bailed out in the afternoon, the time unknown. Pilot Officer D. Mc Gray was shot down at 11:15 GMT and bailed out of the No. 610 Squadron Spitfire X4067. Both men were shot down near Dover.

On 30 August 1940, Ihlefeld claimed his tenth victory of the war, another Spitfire probably shot down over the English Channel near Calais. On this day, Gruppenkommandeur (group commander) of I.(J)/LG 2, Hauptmann Bernhard Mielke, was killed in action. Later that day, Ihlefeld was appointed his successor as Gruppenkommandeur. In consequence, command of 2.(J)/LG 2 then went to Oberleutnant Friedrich-Wilhelm Strakeljahn. The next day, I.(J)/LG 2 flew fighter escort missions for II.(S)/LG 2, the ground attack Gruppe of LG 2. On two separate missions they attacked the airfield at Biggin Hill on their first mission (10:25 – 11:20), and in the evening Croydon airfield. The German flight believed they encountered Hurricanes from No. 303 Polish Fighter Squadron on the second mission. The Germans claimed four victories, one of which by Ihlefeld, for the loss of two in combat. 303 Squadron, if engaged during this day, suffered no fighters damaged or destroyed on this day. Their likely opponents were from No. 17 Squadron which lost one Hurricane. The pilot Sergeant G.A Steward was unhurt. I./LG 2 lost one Bf 109 destroyed and one sixty percent damaged. Oberleutnant von Perthes was shot down and killed by Flying Officer T. Bird-Wilson.

On 2 September 1940, he increased his total to 13 aerial victories, claiming two Spitfires, on a mission against the Hornchurch airfield. No Spitfires were lost in the battle over Hornchurch though two Spitfires belonging to No. 222 Squadron were damaged. Three day later, Detling airfield was the target, and Ihlefeld again claimed two Spitfires shot down. On 6 September, I.(J)/LG 2 escorted Erprobungsgruppe 210 to various airfields in the greater London area. Again Ihlefeld claimed two victories, two Hurricanes shot down took his total to 17 aerial victories. 19 Hurricanes were destroyed to all causes and two damaged on this date in intensive air battles.

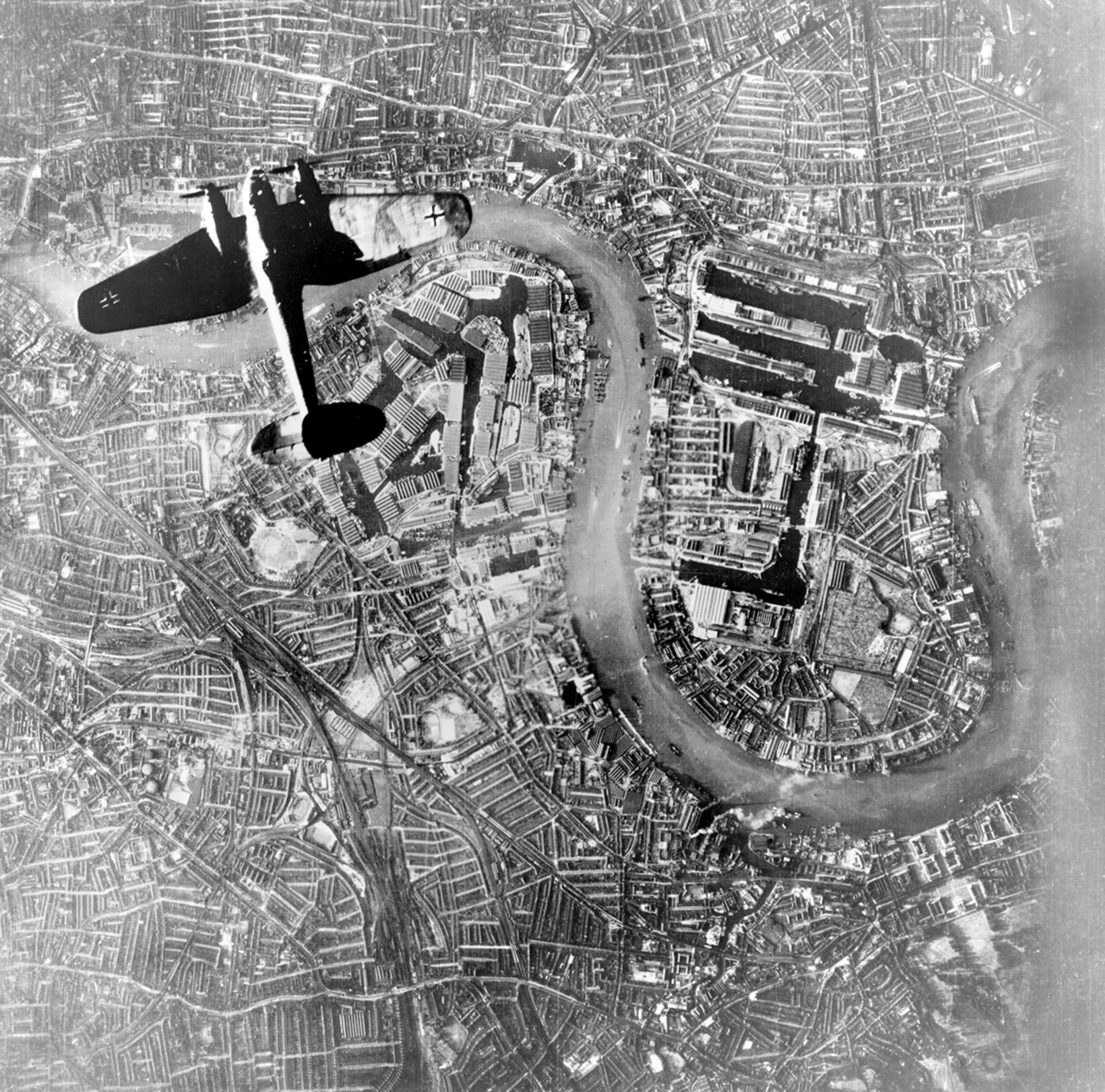
Heinkel He 111 bomber over the Surrey docks and Wapping in the East End of London on 7 September 1940

On 7 September 1940, I.(J)/LG 2 participated in Operation "Loge", 350 bombers escorted by 648 fighters, attacked various targets in the greater London area. Ihlefeld's Gruppe protected those bombers heading for the docks in the East End of London. On this mission, Ihlefeld claimed a Hurricane shot down at 18:05 and another one at 18:10. 17 Hurricanes were destroyed and 7 damaged this day. Up to 19 of these aircraft were hit or destroyed in the time-frame of the claim. The Luftwaffe flew another large scale attack on 11 September. In total, 280 bombers, 96 of which headed for London, supported by 750 fighter aircraft, headed for England. Ihlefeld claimed a Spitfire destroyed at 17:05 and a Hurricane at 17:10 that day. This took his total to 21 aerial victories in World War II, for which he was awarded the Knight's Cross of the Iron Cross (Ritterkreuz des Eisernen Kreuzes) on 13 September 1940. The presentation was made by Hitler personally on 16 September 1940. One day before the presentation, the Battle of Britain Day, Ihlefeld had claimed the 22nd aerial victory, a Hurricane. At 10:00 on 24 September 1940, Ihlefeld engaged Spitfires in combat over Maidstone, claiming one shot down. There were four Spitfires lost and two damaged in combat on this date. None were shot down at the time of the claim or in this district. Three days later, on a fighter escort to mission to London, he claimed two Hurricanes, taking his total to 25 aerial victories. On this mission, Ihlefeld lost his 1. Staffel commander, Oberleutnant Adolf Buhl. Responsible for his loss was Fähnrich (Officer Candidate) Hans-Joachim Marseille who had abandoned Buhl. Ihlefeld was forced to give Marseille a stern rebuke for his conduct in combat and eventually dismissed Marseille from LG 2. He was promoted to Hauptmann on 1 October 1940.

The war of attrition against the RAF had cost I.(J)/LG 2 dearly, and the entire Gruppe had to be moved back to the home airfield Köln-Butzweilerhof to reform and re-equip on 5 November 1940. From 30 June to end of October 1940, the Gruppe had claimed 92 aerial victories for the loss of 10 pilots either killed or missing in action, further 4 pilots had been taken prisoner of war. In the same timeframe, 38 aircraft were damaged or lost. I.(J)/LG 2 was ordered back to the Channel Front on 26 December 1940. That day, it flew to the airfield at Calais-Marck and was subordinated to the Stab (headquarters unit) of Jagdgeschwader 52 (JG 52—52nd Fighter Wing). Ihlefeld claimed his 26th victory of the war at 15:50 on 17 January 1941 northwest of Boulogne-sur-Mer.

On 5 February 1941, the RAF began the Circus offensive against the Luftwaffe, a series of attacks flown by heavily escorted bombers targeted the coastal region in northern France. Ihlefeld claimed a Spitfire destroyed at 17:35 on 10 February. The RAF had sent a Circus against various targets in the vicinity of Pas-de-Calais. Four days later, he claimed two Spitfires shot down on a combat air patrol over Ashford and Canterbury. On 26 February 1941, Ihlefeld shot down Sergeant Howard Squire, his 30th victory of the war, in his Spitfire from No. 54 Squadron on Circus No. 5 mission. Twelve Blenheim bombers from No. 139 Squadron had targeted harbor installations at Calais. They were protected by Hurricane and Spitfire fighters from No. 54, No. 74, No. 92, No. 601 and No. 609 Squadron. Squire made a forced landing and was taken prisoner of war. In combat with Spitfires west of Calais, Ihlefeld claimed his 31st victory at 17:20 on 1 March 1941. At 15:45 on 13 March 1941, I.(J)/LG 2 combated Spitfires 20 kilometers (12 miles) north of Cap Gris Nez and Ihlefeld again claimed one of his opponents shot down. His next two claims were submitted following combat over Hastings on 19 March. Two Spitfires shot down at 19:08 and 19:10 took his tally to 34 aerial victories. Ihlefeld claimed his last victory on the Channel Front on 25 March 1941. The combat with another Spitfire took place in the vicinity of Dungeness. On 30 March 1941, I.(J)/LG 2 was ordered to relocate to Vienna. At the Channel Front since December 1940, I.(J)/LG 2 had claimed 24 aerial victories for the loss of 3 pilots killed.

=== Balkan Campaign ===
The Balkan Campaign began on 6 April 1941, with multiple objectives. Operation Marita was the codename for the German invasion of Greece, while I.(J)/LG 2 was committed to the invasion of Yugoslavia. Based at Radomir in Bulgaria, the unit was subordinated to Generaloberst (Colonel General) Wolfram Freiherr von Richthofen's VIII. Fliegerkorps (8th Air Corps). I.(J)/LG 2 primary targets in this campaign were various Jugoslovensko Kraljevsko Ratno Vazduhoplovstvo (JKRV—Yugoslav Royal Air Force) airfields in the greater Skopje area. The Gruppe, together with the ground attack unit II.(S)/LG 2, flew five combat missions on the first day of the campaign. During one of these missions, strafing the railway up the Vardar valley and an airfield near Niš, Ihlefeld was shot down in his Bf 109 E-7 (Werknummer 2057—factory number) by anti-aircraft artillery and was captured by Yugoslavian soldiers. (Note: According to Ciglic, Weal and Savic, Ihlefeld shot down a JKRV Potez 25 on the landing approach, Shortly after, he was hit by a lucky shot fired from the ground by Serbian kap Vlastimir Belic, forcing him to bail out near Donji Dušnik.) The airfield at Niš was practically deserted and Ihlefeld had been hit by small arms fire and was slightly wounded in the head. While in their custody, he was allegedly severely beaten, and threatened with execution by firing squad. On 14 April 1941, he was rescued by German troops of the 5th Panzer Division after eight days in captivity, and returned to Germany to recover.

The invasion of Yugoslavia ended when an armistice was signed on 17 April 1941. That day, I.(J)/LG 2 relocated to Ptolemaida, Greece and to Larissa three days later. On 21 April, I.(J)/LG 2 flew missions against the port of Piraeus and Athens . I.(J)/LG 2 then moved to Eleusis on 27 April. The Battle of Greece ended on 30 April 1941 and the Gruppe was granted a period of rest which ended on 2 May 1941. In preparation for the Battle of Crete (20 May – 1 June 1941), I.(J)/LG 2 flew reconnaissance missions over Crete on 13 May 1941. Missions against Crete were flown from an airfield at Molaoi. One day later, the unit flew its first ground attack mission against various targets. On 22 May 1941, I.(J)/LG 2 successfully attacked HMS Fiji off of Crete, damaging her severely. Ihlefeld was credited with his only aerial victory over Crete on 26 May 1941. His 36th victory was claimed over Maleme against a Hurricane fighter. Actions over Crete ended for I.(J)/LG 2 on 31 May 1941. By this date, the Gruppe had claimed six aerial victories in this campaign. I.(J)/LG 2 was then withdrawn and relocated to Belgrad in preparation for Operation Barbarossa, the German invasion of the Soviet Union.

=== Eastern Front ===
On 18 June 1941, I.(J)/LG 2 was moved to Bucharest and placed under the command of JG 77. The Geschwader was located in the sector of Heeresgruppe Süd (Army Group South). Three days later, I.(J)/LG 2 moved to Roman. That evening, the pilots and ground crews were briefed of the upcoming invasion of the Soviet Union, which opened the Eastern Front. At 3:20 on 22 June 1941, 70 Bf 109s of JG 77 and I.(J)/LG 2 crossed into Soviet airspace and attacked airfields and provided fighter protection for III. Gruppe of Kampfgeschwader 27 (KG 27—27th Bomber Wing). Ihlefeld claimed his first two victories, both SB-2 bombers, on the Eastern Front on 23 June 1941. JG 77 and I.(J)/LG 2 flew seven combat missions that day. On the first mission of the day, 34 Bf 109 provided fighter escort for two Gruppen of KG 27 in support of the advancing German ground forces. At 05:50, Ihlefeld claimed his 37th victory of the war. On the seventh mission, which began at 19:10, he claimed the second bomber in the area of Chernivtsi. Two Ilyushin DB-3 bombers shot down on 26 June 1941 took his total to 40 aerial victories in World War II. This achievement earned him the Knight's Cross of the Iron Cross with Oak Leaves (Ritterkreuz des Eisernen Kreuzes mit Eichenlaub) on 27 June 1941. He was the 16th member of the German armed forces to be so honored.

Ihlefeld, on a combat air patrol in the vicinity of Iași, claimed an I-16 fighter aircraft shot down on 28 June. The next day I.(J)/LG 2 moved to an airfield at Uzhhorod and to Tudora on 1 July 1941. On 2 July, I.(J)/LG 2 flew five combat missions and Ihlefeld achieved his 42nd aerial victory over a Polikarpov I-153 biplane fighter. On a Stuka escort mission to Kamianets-Podilskyi on 4 July, he shot down an I-15. On 6 July, I.(J)/LG 2 flew seven combat missions, on two of which they had enemy contact. On the sixth mission of the day, the unit encountered five SB-2 bombers escorted by seven I-16 fighters. In the resulting aerial combat, Ihlefeld shot down one I-16, his 44th victory.

On 30 August 1941, he became an "ace-in-a-day" by shooting down five Soviet aircraft, his 48th to 52nd aerial victories. On 6 January 1942, I.(J)/LG 2 was officially redesignated and became the I. Gruppe of JG 77. In the spring of 1942, a series of multiple victories (five aircraft on 24 March, seven on 30 March and seven on 20 April), saw Ihlefeld become the fifth pilot on 22 April 1942 to reach 100 victories during World War II. This achievement earned him a named reference in the Wehrmachtbericht. During the period of Ihlefeld's leadership, I. Gruppe of JG 77 was credited with the destruction of 323 enemy aircraft while losing only 17 Bf 109s. On 24 April 1942, he was awarded the Knight's Cross of the Iron Cross with Oak Leaves and Swords (Ritterkreuz des Eisernen Kreuzes mit Eichenlaub und Schwertern), the 9th member of the German armed forces to be so honored. The presentation was made by Hitler at the Wolf's Lair, Hitler's headquarters in Rastenburg, present-day Kętrzyn in Poland. Also presented with awards that day by Hitler were Oberleutnant Wolfgang Späte and Oberleutnant Wolf-Dietrich Huy, who both received the Oak Leaves to their Knight's Crosses.

=== Wing Commander ===
On 10 May 1942, Ihlefeld was replaced by Hauptmann Heinrich Bär as Gruppenkommandeur of I. Gruppe. Ihlefeld had been selected to take over JG 52 as Geschwaderkommodore (Wing Commander). Prior to this appointment, he was sent to the Geschwaderstab of Jagdgeschwader 51 (JG 51—51st Fighter Wing) as a commander-in-training under Hauptmann Karl-Gottfried Nordmann. In June 1942, Ihlefeld was promoted to Major (major) and on 22 June took command of JG 52. He replaced Oberstleutnant Friedrich Beckh who had been killed in action the day before. At the time, the Geschwaderstab of JG 52 was based at Barvinkove. On 29 June, the Geschwaderstab moved to Volchansk. Here on 1 July, Ihlefeld claimed his first aerial victory with JG 52 over a Mikoyan-Gurevich MiG-1 fighter. The next day another relocation took them to an airfield named Ssowy south of Kursk. Here on 4 July, Ihlefeld claimed a Hurricane fighter shot down.

On 19 July, the Geschwaderstab moved to an airfield near Taganrog located on the north shore of the Sea of Azov. Three days later, Ihlefeld was badly wounded whilst flying a Fieseler Fi 156 Storch, a small liaison aircraft. That day, Ihlefeld had flown to Stalino, present-day Donetsk. Flying over the airfield at Taganrog, he conducted an aerial inspection of the camouflage of the airfield, when the ailerons of his Fi 156 C-2 (Werknummer 4436) failed, ending in a crash landing. During his convalescence, he was temporarily replaced by Major Gordon Gollob who also led JG 77 at the time. On 28 October, command of JG 52 was officially passed to Major Dietrich Hrabak while Ihlefeld was transferred and tasked with the leadership of Jagdfliegerschule 3 (JFS 3—3rd Fighter Pilot School), a fighter pilot school, which later became Jagdgeschwader 103 (JG 103—103rd Fighter Wing).

On 1 June 1943, the Luftwaffe ordered the creation of Jagdgeschwader Nord (JG Nord—Northern Fighter Wing) at Staaken, located approximately 18 kilometers (11 miles) northwest of Berlin. It was planned by to create this Geschwader with a Geschwaderstab and three Staffeln only. Its primary purpose was to combat the RAF de Havilland Mosquito aerial reconnaissance and fast bombers. The unit received the Bf 109 G-5, a high-altitude variant equipped with a pressurized cockpit and a GM-1 boost system. On 21 July, Ihlefeld was appointed Geschwaderkommodore of this unit. JG Nord was renamed and became Jagdgeschwader 25 (JG 25—25th Fighter Wing) on 15 August. With the increasing number of daytime attacks flown by United States Air Force (USAAF), JG 25 was also deployed in defense of the Reich missions. Ihlefeld claimed his only aerial victory with JG 25 on 13 November during an attack flown by the USAAF VIII Bomber Command on Bremen. Defending against this attack, Ihlefeld was credited with shooting down an escorting Lockheed P-38 Lightning fighter. Due to the lack of success, the order was given to cease operations and JG 25 was disbanded on 26 November. In consequence, Ihlefeld was transferred to the staff of the 30. Jagd Division (30th Fighter Division).

On 1 February 1944, Ihlefeld was promoted to Oberstleutnant (lieutenant colonel). In May 1944, he briefly became Geschwaderkommodore of Jagdgeschwader 11 (JG 11—11th Fighter Wing), before taking command of Jagdgeschwader 1 "Oesau" (JG 1—1st Fighter Wing) on 20 May 1944. Ihlefeld replaced Bär as Geschwaderkommodore who had led the Geschwader since the death in combat of Oberst Walter Oesau on 11 May 1944. On 14 July 1944, Ihlefeld claimed a North American P-51 Mustang and a Spitfire shot down. He was credited with his next victories on 25 July, claiming the destruction of an Avro Lancaster heavy bomber and a Spitfire.

=== Operation Bodenplatte ===
Ihlefeld participated and led JG 1 in Operation Bodenplatte, the failed attempt to cripple Allied air forces in the Low Countries. The objective of Bodenplatte was to gain air superiority during the stagnant stage of the Battle of the Bulge and dates back to meeting held on 16 September 1944. That day, Hitler informed General der Flieger (Lieutenant General) Werner Kreipe, acting Chief of the General Staff of the Luftwaffe, about the planned offensive. Ihlefeld probably learned of this operation on 5 December 1944. Luftwaffenkommando West (Air Command West) had ordered every wing commander of all the Jagdgeschwaders destined to participate in the operation to attend a meeting at the headquarters of II. Jagdkorps (2nd Fighter Corps) at Flammersfeld near Koblenz. At the time, Ihlefeld was faced with a very challenging leadership situation. Prior to the operation, JG 1 had lost the commander of I. Gruppe, Hauptmann Hans Ehlers who was killed in action on 27 December, and the commander of III. Gruppe, Hauptmann Erich Woitke who had been killed in action on 24 December. The commander of II. Gruppe, Hauptmann Hermann Staiger, had landed his combat damaged aircraft at Frankfurt and had not yet returned to his unit. On the early afternoon of 31 December 1944, Ihlefeld summoned his three new Gruppenkommandeure to Twente for the mission briefing. The new I. Gruppe commander was Hauptmann Georg Hackbarth, II. Gruppe was led by Oberleutnant Fritz Wegner and III. Gruppe was now headed by Hauptmann Harald Moldenhauer.

On 1 January 1945, the Geschwaderstab and I. Gruppe, both based at Twente, took off at 08:10 and joined up with and III. Gruppe, based at Rheine, which had taken off at 8:15. Their designated targets were the airfields at Maldegem and Ursel. The formation was led by four Junkers Ju 88 night fighters from Nachtjagdgeschwader 1 (NJG 1—1st Night Fighter Wing); they were the pathfinders for the single-engined fighters. The formation of 20 Focke Wulf Fw 190 A-8s and 30 Bf 109 G-14s, flying at an altitude of 50 meters (160 feet), headed west. As the flight approached The Hague, they came under heavy and precise German anti-artillery fire. The German anti-artillery units had not been informed of the Luftwaffe operation. Several aircraft were hit, including the aircraft of Ihlefeld who had to make a forced landing near Rotterdam. II. Gruppe, based at Drope, between Lengerich and Bawinkel, had also taken off at 08:15 and headed for the airfield at Ghent/Sint-Denijs-Westrem. JG 1 continued with their mission without Ihlefeld leading the decisive phase of the attack. The result of the attack can be described as Pyrrhic victory at best. JG 1 claimed the destruction of around 60 enemy aircraft, of which 54 were destroyed on the ground, for the loss of 25 pilots and 29 aircraft.

Following Operation Bodenplatte, JG 1 was relocated to the Eastern Front. During the relocation, I. Gruppe faced RAF fighters over Hengelo-Twente on 14 January 1945. JG 1 lost 12 pilots with 7 being killed, 3 wounded and 2 missing. Spitfires shot down the entire 1. and 2. Staffeln of JG 1 at Twente Airport as they took off, for the loss of two. Ihlefeld threatened to court martial Major Günther Capito, the new commander of I. Gruppe, for such a disastrous loss but was unable to during the transferring to the Eastern Front. By 19 January, the Geschwaderstab and all three Gruppen had reached their new airfields. The Geschwaderstab, I. and II. Gruppe were then based in East Prussia, with I. Gruppe in Jürgenfelde, present-day Judino in Kaliningrad Oblast, and II. Gruppe in Insterburg, present-day Chernyakhovsk in Russia, while III. Gruppe was sent to Schröttersburg, present-day Płock, located on the Vistula river approximately 70 kilometers (43 miles) northwest of Warsaw.

=== Flying the He 162 and end of war ===
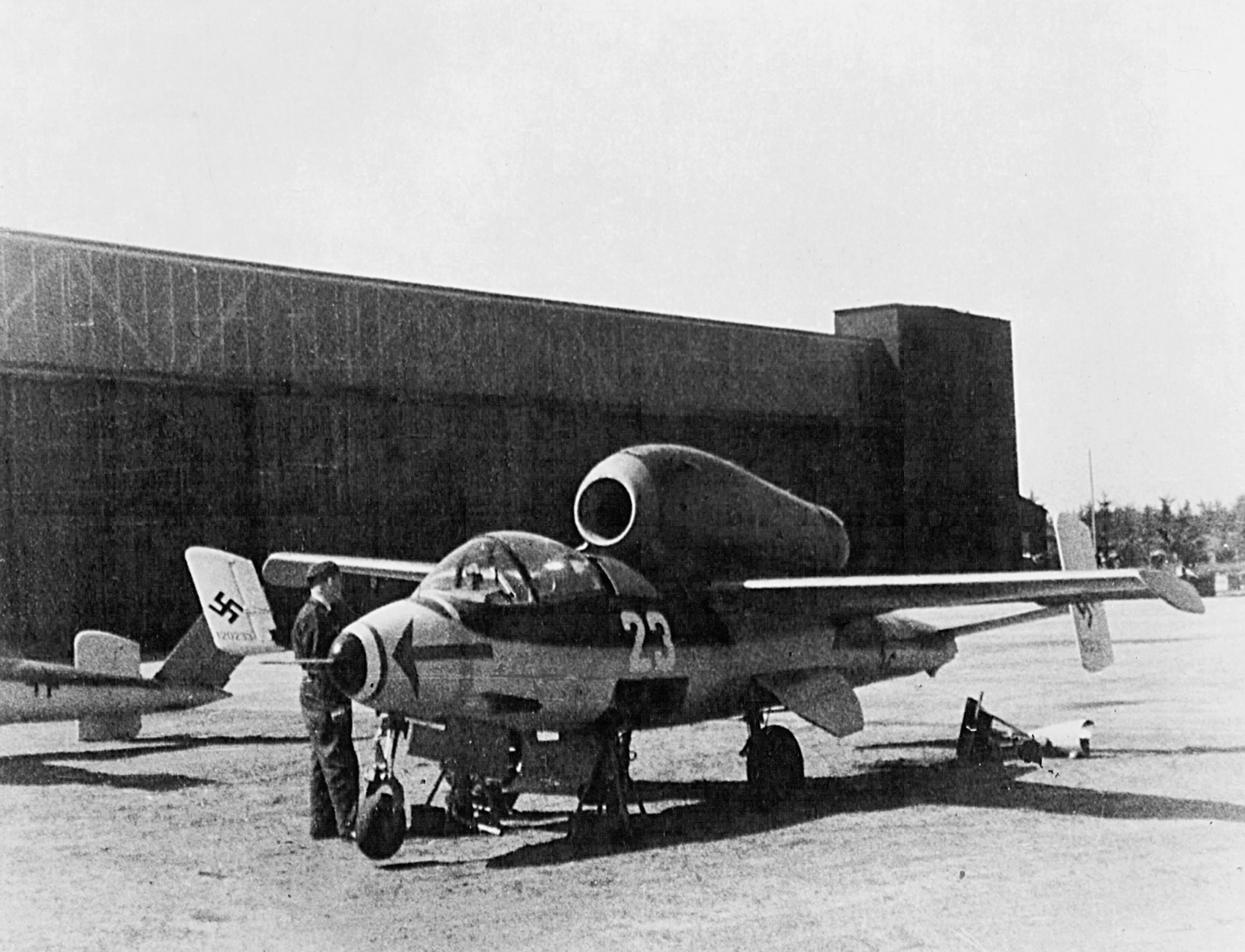
He 162 A-2 (Werknummer 120230) in France, brought to the US by Operation Lusty

As Geschwaderkommodore, Ihlefeld was ordered to Berlin on 22 January 1945 and attended the meeting with Reichsmarschall Hermann Göring which was later dubbed the Fighter Pilots' Mutiny. This was an attempt to reinstate Generalleutnant Adolf Galland as General der Jagdflieger who had been dismissed for outspokenness regarding the Oberkommando der Luftwaffe (Luftwaffe high command), and had been replaced by Oberst Gordon Gollob. The meeting was held at the Haus der Flieger in Berlin and was attended by a number of high-ranking fighter pilot leaders which included Ihlefeld, Günther Lützow, Hannes Trautloft, Hermann Graf, Gerhard Michalski, Helmut Bennemann, Kurt Bühligen and Erich Leie, and their antagonist Göring supported by his staff Bernd von Brauchitsch and Karl Koller. The fighter pilots, with Lützow taking the lead as spokesman, criticized Göring and made him personally responsible for the decisions taken which effectively had led to the lost air war over Europe.

Ihlefeld was promoted to Oberst (colonel) on 30 January 1945. On 7 February, I. Gruppe of JG 1 was withdrawn from combat operation and ordered to Parchim Airfield. There, I. Gruppe was equipped with the He 162 Volksjäger, a single-engine, jet-powered fighter aircraft, the first unit to receive this aircraft type. Originally the Luftwaffe had planned to create a new formed unit, Jagdgeschwader 80 (JG 80—80th Fighter Wing), staffed with pilots of the National Socialist Flyers Corps (NSFK—Nationalsozialistisches Fliegerkorps) and the Flieger-HJ, the flying members of the Hitler Youth. The deteriorating war situation, the loss of Fw 190 manufacturing locations, changed this plan and units previously equipped with Fw 190 were selected for conversion to the He 162. By mid April, the Geschwaderstab and I. Gruppe were based at Ludwigslust while II. Gruppe was stationed at Warnemünde and were equipped with the He 162 while III, Gruppe were at Lüneburg Airfield but had no aircraft to fly. He 162 A-2 (Werknummer 120230), Ihlefeld flew this aircraft during the war, is currently in possession of the National Air and Space Museum collection. At the time of the German surrender at Lüneburg Heath on 4 May, JG 1 was based at Leck Airfield. The first British soldiers began arriving at Leck the following day. On 6 May, the British began disarming the German soldiers at Leck, taking them as prisoner of war.

== Later life ==
Following World War II, Ihlefeld did not rejoin the military service of the German Air Force, at the time referred to as the Bundesluftwaffe, of the Federal Republic of Germany. However, he did continue flying as civilian pilot. In 1984, Winston Ramsey, the editor of After the Battle magazine, contacted both Ihlefeld and Squire, who Ihlefeld had shot down on 26 February 1941, and arranged a meeting. Subsequently, Ihlefeld and Squire met at Calais. Ihlefeld died on 8 August 1995 in Wennigsen, Lower Saxony. His ashes were buried on the urn field near the chapel on the old cemetery in Kirchheim unter Teck, Baden-Württemberg.

== Summary of career ==
=== Aerial victory claims ===
According to US historian David T. Zabecki, Ihlefeld was credited with 123 World War II aerial victories. Spick lists him with 130 aerial victories, including seven claims in Spain, claimed in over 1,000 combat missions and a mission-to-claim ratio of 7.69. Mathews and Foreman, authors of Luftwaffe Aces — Biographies and Victory Claims, researched the German Federal Archives and found documentation for 122 aerial victory claims, plus five further unconfirmed claims. This number includes nine claims during the Spanish Civil War, 48 on the Western Front, including three four-engined bombers, and 65 on the Eastern Front.

=== Awards ===
- Spanish Medalla Militar
- Spanish Cross in Gold with Swords
- Wound Badge in Black
- Front Flying Clasp of the Luftwaffe in Gold with Pennant "1000"
- Combined Pilots-Observation Badge
- Iron Cross (1939)
  - 2nd Class (26 September 1939)
  - 1st Class (4 July 1940)
- Honor Goblet of the Luftwaffe (12 June 1941)
- German Cross in Gold on 9 April 1942 as Hauptmann in the I./Jagdgeschwader 77
- Knight's Cross of the Iron Cross with Oak Leaves and Swords
  - Knight's Cross on 13 September 1940 as Oberleutnant and pilot in the I./Jagdgeschwader 77 (Note: According to Scherzer in the I.(J)/Lehrgeschwader 2.)
  - 16th Oak Leaves on 27 June 1941 as Hauptmann and Gruppenkommandeur of the I./Jagdgeschwader 77
  - 9th Swords on 24 April 1942 as Hauptmann and Gruppenkommandeur of the I./Jagdgeschwader 77

=== Promotions ===
October 1935:	Unteroffizier
20 August 1939:	Leutnant (Second Lieutenant)
1 June 1940:	Oberleutnant (First Lieutenant)
1 October 1940:	Hauptmann (Captain)
June 1942:	Major (Major)
1 February 1944:	Oberstleutnant (Lieutenant Colonel)
30 January 1945:	Oberst (Colonel)

== Notes ==
Military offices
Preceded by Oberstleutnant Friedrich Beckh	Commander of Jagdgeschwader 52; 22 June 1942 – 28 October 1942	Succeeded by Oberstleutnant Dietrich Hrabak
Preceded by none	Commander of Jagdgeschwader 103; 7 December 1942 – 20 July 1943	Succeeded by Major Hans von Hahn
Preceded by none	Commander of Jagdgeschwader 25; July 1943 – December 1943	Succeeded by none
Preceded by Major Anton Hackl	Commander of Jagdgeschwader 11; 1 May 1944 – May 1944	Succeeded by Major Günther Specht
Preceded by Major Heinrich Bär	Commander of Jagdgeschwader 1 Oesau; 20 May 1944 – 8 May 1945	Succeeded by none
