= Kruszka =

Kruszka may refer to the following places:

- Kruszka, Greater Poland Voivodeship (west-central Poland)
- Kruszka, Kuyavian-Pomeranian Voivodeship (north-central Poland)
- Kruszka, Pomeranian Voivodeship (north Poland)
