= Borucino =

Borucino may refer to the following places:

- Borucino, Greater Poland Voivodeship (west-central Poland)
- Borucino, Pomeranian Voivodeship (north Poland)
- Borucino, West Pomeranian Voivodeship (north-west Poland)
