= Ewald Friedrich von Hertzberg =

Prussian politician (1725–1795)

Ewald Friedrich, Graf von Hertzberg
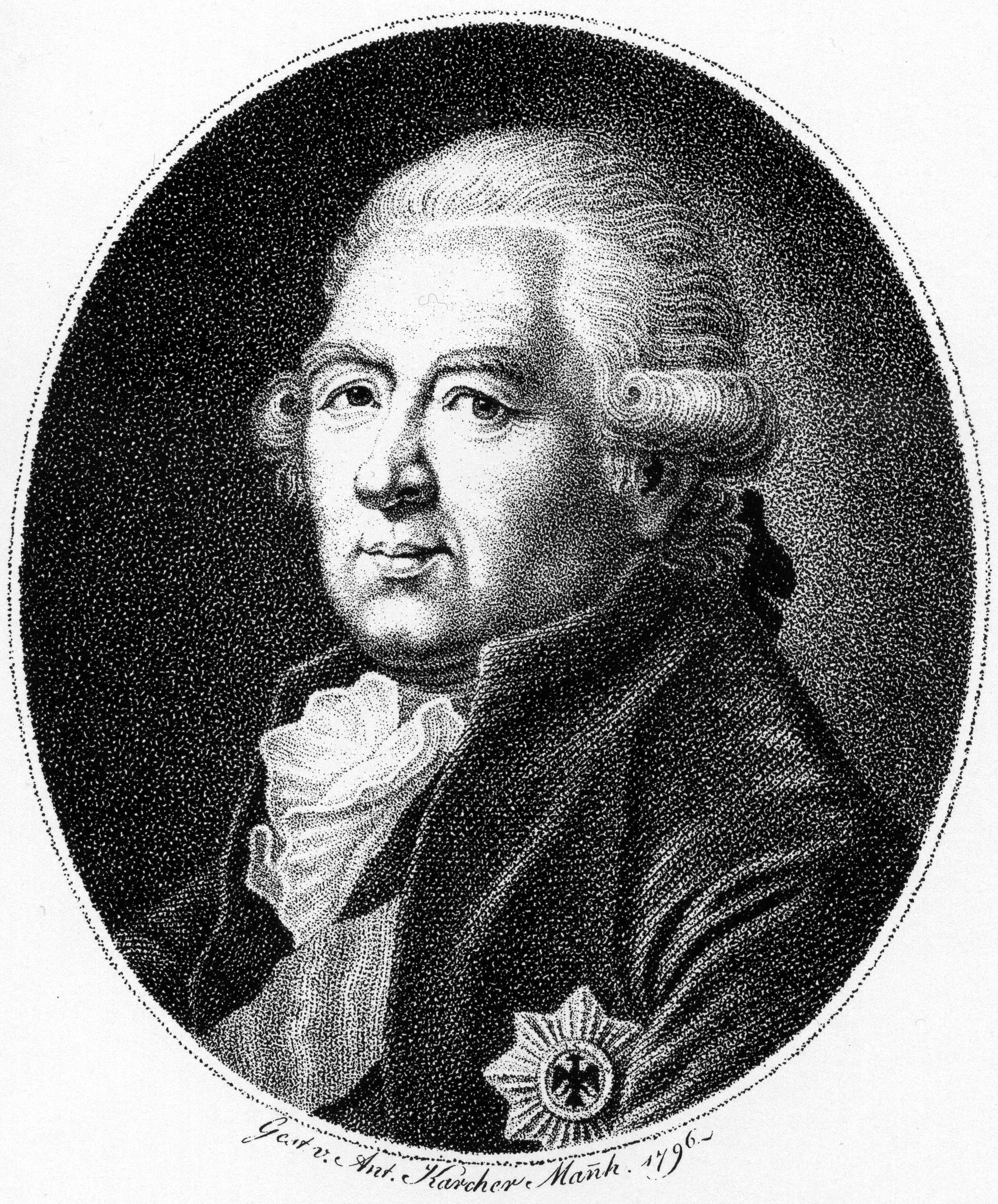
- Born: 2 September 1725; Lottin
- Died: 22 May 1795 (aged 69); Berlin
- Occupation: Administrative/government official
- Years active: 1745–1791

Ewald Friedrich Graf von Hertzberg (2 September 1725 – 22 May 1795) was a Prussian statesman.

== Early life ==
Hertzberg, who came of a noble family which had been settled in Pomerania since the 13th century, was born at Lottin (present-day Lotyń, a part of Okonek) near Neustettin.

After 1739 he studied, chiefly classics and history at the gymnasium at Stettin, and in 1742 entered the university of Halle as a student of jurisprudence, becoming in due course a doctor of laws in 1745. In addition to this principal study, he was also interested while at the university in historical and philosophical (Christian Wolff) studies. A first thesis for his doctorate, entitled Jus publicum Brandenburgicum, was not printed, because it contained a criticism of the existing condition of the state. Shortly afterwards Hertzberg entered the government service, in which he was first employed in the department of the state archives (of which he became director in 1750), soon after in the foreign office, and finally in 1763 as chief minister (Cabinetsminister). In 1752 he married Baroness Marie von Knyphausen, a marriage which was happy, but childless.

== Political career ==
For more than forty years Hertzberg played an active part in the Prussian foreign office. In this capacity he had a decisive influence on Prussian policy, both under Frederick the Great and his successor, Frederick William II. At the beginning of the Seven Years' War (1756) he took part as a political writer in the Hohenzollern-Habsburg quarrel, both in his Ursachen, die S.K.M. in Preussen bewogen haben, sich wider die Absichten des Wienerischen Hofes zu setzen and deren Ausführung zuvorzukommen ("Motives which have induced the king of Prussia to oppose the intentions of the court of Vienna, and to prevent them from being carried into effect"), and in his Mémoire raisonné sur la conduite des tours de Vienne et de Saxe, based on the secret papers taken by Frederick the Great from the archives of Dresden.

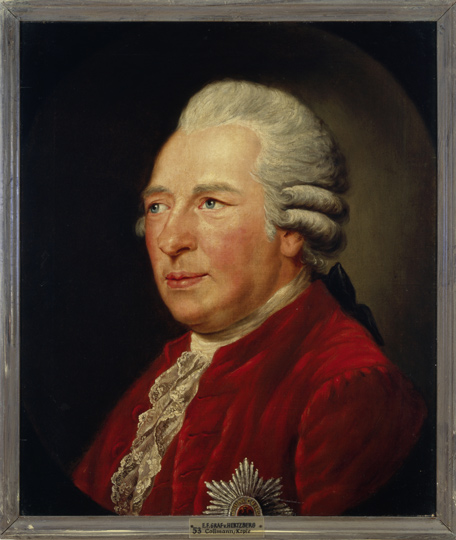
Portrait of Hertzberg (1789) by Ferdinand Collmann.

After the defeat at Kolin (1757) he hastened to Pomerania to organise the national defence there and collect the necessary troops for the protection of the fortresses of Stettin and Colberg. In the same year he conducted the peace negotiations with Sweden, and was of great service in bringing about the peace of Hubertsburg (1763), on the conclusion of which the king received him with the words, "I congratulate you. You have made peace as I made war, one against many."

In the later years, too, of Frederick the Great's reign, Hertzberg played a considerable part in foreign policy. In 1772, in a memoir based upon comprehensive historical studies, he defended the Prussian claims to certain provinces of Poland. He also took part successfully as a publicist in the negotiations concerning the question of the Bavarian succession (1778) and those of the peace of Teschen (1779). In 1780 he failed to uphold Prussian interests at the election of the bishop of Münster. In 1784 appeared Hertzberg's memoir containing a thorough study of the Fürstenbund. He championed this latest creation of Frederick the Great's mainly with a view to an energetic reform of the empire, though the idea of German unity was naturally still far from his mind.

In 1785 followed "An explanation of-the motives which have led the king of Prussia to propose to the other fellow high estates of the empire an association for the maintenance of the system of the empire" (Erklärung der Ursachen, welche S.M. in Preussen bewogen haben, ihren hohen Mitständen des Reichs eine Association zur Erhaltung des Reichssystems anzutragen). By upholding the Fürstenbund Hertzberg made many enemies, prominent among whom was the king's brother, Prince Henry. Though the Fürstenbund failed to effect a reform of the empire, it at any rate prevented the fulfilment of Emperor Joseph II's old desire for the incorporation of Bavaria with Austria.

The last act of state in which Hertzberg took part under Frederick the Great was the commercial treaty concluded in 1785 between Prussia and the United States. With Frederick, especially in his later years, Hertzberg stood in very intimate personal relations and was often the king's guest at Sanssouci. Under Frederick William II his influential position at the court of Berlin was at first unshaken. The king at once received him with favour, as is clearly proved by Hertzberg's elevation to the rank of count in 1786; and Mirabeau would never have attacked him with such violence in his Secret History of the Court of Berlin, which appeared in 1788, if he had not seen in him the most powerful man after the king.

In this attack Mirabeau seems to have been influenced by Hertzberg's personal enemies at the court. Hertzberg's political system remained on the whole the same under Frederick William II as it had been under his predecessor. It was mainly characterised by a sharp opposition to the house of Habsburg and by a desire to win for Prussia the support of England, a policy supported by him in important memoirs of the years 1786 and 1787. His diplomacy was directed also against Austria's old ally, France. Hence it was chiefly owing to Hertzberg that in 1787, in spite of the king's unwillingness at first, Prussia intervened in the Netherlands in support of the stadtholder William V against the democratic French party.

The success of this intervention, which was the practical realisation of a plan very characteristic of Hertzberg, marks the culminating point in his career. But the opposition between him and the new king, which had already appeared at the time of the conclusion of the triple alliance between the Netherlands, England and Prussia, became more marked in the following years, when Hertzberg, relying upon this alliance, and in conscious imitation of Frederick II's policy at the time of the first partition of Poland, sought to take advantage of the entanglement of Austria with Russia in the war with Turkey to secure for Prussia an extension of territory by diplomatic intervention.

According to his plan, Prussia was to offer her mediation at the proper moment, and in the territorial readjustments that the peace would bring, was to receive Danzig and Thorn as her portion. Beyond this he aimed at preventing the restoration of the hegemony of Austria in the Empire, and secretly cherished the hope of restoring Frederick the Great's Russian alliance. With a curious obstinacy he continued to pursue these aims even when, owing to military and diplomatic events, they were already partly out of date. His personal position became increasingly difficult, as deep-rooted differences between him and the king were revealed during these diplomatic campaigns: Hertzberg wished to effect everything by peaceful means, while Frederick William II was for a time determined on war with Austria.

As regards Polish policy, too, their ideas came into conflict, Hertzberg having always been openly opposed to the total annihilation of the Polish kingdom. The same is true of the attitude of king and minister towards Great Britain. At the conferences at Reichenbach in the summer of 1790, this opposition became more and more acute, and Hertzberg was only with difficulty persuaded to come to an agreement merely on the basis of the status quo, as demanded by Pitt. The king's renunciation of any extension of territory was in Hertzberg's eyes impolitic, and this view of his was later endorsed by Bismarck. A letter which came to the eyes of the king, in which Hertzberg severely criticised the king's foreign policy, and especially his plans for attacking Russia, led to his dismissal on 5 July 1791. He afterwards made several attempts to exert an influence over foreign affairs, but in vain. The king showed himself more and more personally hostile to the ex-minister, and in later years pursued Hertzberg, now quite embittered, with every kind of petty persecution, even ordering his letters to be opened.

== Literary career ==
Even in his literary interests Hertzberg found an adversary in the ungrateful king, for Frederick William, to give one instance, made it so difficult for him to use the archives that in the end Hertzberg entirely gave up the attempt. He found, however, some recompense for all his disillusionment and discouragement in learning, and, Wilhelm von Humboldt excepted, he was the most learned of all the Prussian ministers. As a member of the Berlin Academy especially, and, from 1786 onwards, as its curator, Hertzberg carried on a great and valuable activity in the world of learning. His yearly reports dealt with history, statistics and political science. The most interesting is that of 1784: Sur la forme des gouvernements, et quelle est la meilleure. This is directed exclusively against the absolute system (following Montesquieu), upholds a limited monarchy, and is in favour of extending to the peasants the right to be represented in the diet.

He spoke for the last time in 1793 on Frederick the Great and the advantages of monarchy. After 1783 these discourses caused a great sensation, since Hertzberg introduced into them a review of the financial situation, which in the days of absolutism seemed an unprecedented innovation. Besides this, Hertzberg exerted himself as an academician to change the strongly French character of the academy and make it into a truly German institution.

=== Works ===
- Mémoires de l'Académie (1780 et seq.) These contain Hertzberg's discourses. The most noteworthy of them were printed in 1787. Here too is to be found: Histoire de la dissertation [du roi] sur la littérature allemande.
- Recueil des déductions, &c., qui ont été rédigés ... pour la cour de Prusse par le ministre (3 vols., 1789–1795)
- "Autobiographical Sketch" published by Höpke in Schmidt's Zeitschrift für Geschichtswissenschaft, i. (1843)

== Later life ==
He showed a keen interest in the old German language and literature. A special "German deputation" was set aside at the academy and entrusted with the drawing up of a German grammar and dictionary. He also stood in very close relations with many of the German poets of the time, and especially with Daniel Schubart. Among the German historians in whom he took a great interest, he had the greatest esteem for Pufendorf. He was equally concerned in the improvement of the state of education. In 1780 he boldly took up the defence of German literature, which had been disparaged by Frederick the Great in his famous writing De la littérature allemande.

Hertzberg's frank and honourable nature little fitted him to be a successful diplomatist; but the course of history has justified many of his aims and ideals, and in Prussia his memory was honoured. He died at Berlin on 22 May 1795 and was buried in the family tomb under the village church (Britzer Dorfkiche) of Britz beside his country estate (Schloss Britz).

== Honours ==
- 1789 – Elected Fellow of the Royal Society
- 1794 - Marcus Elieser Bloch named a sea catfish, Sciades herzbergii after him.

== Sources ==
- "Герцберг, Эвальд-Фридрих" . Brockhaus and Efron Encyclopedic Dictionary (in Russian). 1906.
- This work in turn cites:
  - Mirabeau, Histoire secrète de la cour de Berlin (1788)
  - P. F. Weddigen, Hertzbergs Leben (Bremen, 1797)
  - E. L. Posselt, Hertzbergs Leben (Tübingen, 1798)
  - H. Lehmann, in Neustettiner Programm (1862)
  - E. Fischer, in Staatsanzeiger (1873)
  - M. Duncker, in Historische Zeitschrift (1877)
  - Paul Bailleu, in Historische Zeitschrift (1879) and Allgemeine deutsche Biographie (1880)
  - H. Petrich, Pommersche Lebensbilder i. (1880)
  - G. Dressler, Friedrich II. und Hertzberg in ihrer Stellung zu den holländischen Wirren (University of Breslau dissertation, 1882)
  - K. Krauel, Hertzberg als Minister Friedrich Wilhelms II (Berlin, 1899)
  - F. K. Wittichen, in Historische Vierteljahrschrift, 9 (1906)
  - A. Th. Preuss, Ewald Friedrich, Graf von Hertzberg (Berlin, 1909)
  - J. Hashagen, "Hertzbergs Verhältnis zur deutschen Literatur," in Zeitschrift fur deutsche Philologie for 1903.
  - General works:
  - F. K. Wittichen, Preussen und England, 1785–1788 (Heidelberg, 1902)
  - F. Luckwaldt, Die englisch-preussische Allianz von 1788 in den Forschungen zur brandenburgisch-preussischen Geschichte, Bd. 15, and in the Delbruckfestschrift (Berlin, 1908)
  - L. Sevin, System der preussischen Geheimpolitik 1790–1791 (University of Heidelberg dissertation, 1903)
  - P. Wittichen, Die polönische Politik Preussens 1788–1790 (Berlin, 1899)
  - F. Andreae, Preussische and russische Politik in Polen 1787–1789 (Humboldt University of Berlin dissertation, 1905)
  - W. Wenck, Deutschland vor 100 Jahren (2 vols, 1887, 1890)
  - Adolf Harnack, Geschichte der preussischen Akademie (4 vols, 1899)
  - Consentius, Preussische Jahrbücher (1904)
- Freunde und Förderer Schloss Britz e.V. (compiler): 300 Jahre Schloss Britz. Ewald Friedrich Graf von Hertzberg und die Berliner Aufklärung (Berlin, 2006).
