= Stefan Kwiatkowski =

Polish commander

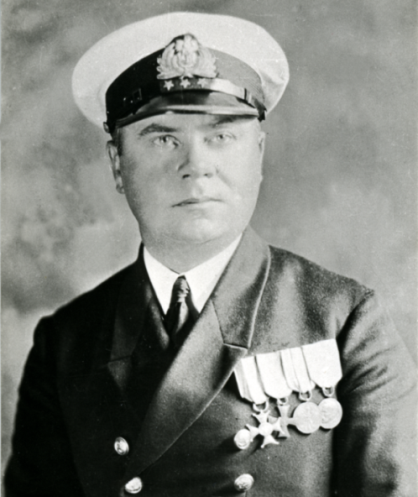
- Born: 8 November 1894; Korelicze, Grodno, Russia
- Died: 1 September 1939 (aged 44); Gdańsk Bay, Baltic Sea
- Military career
- Allegiance: Russian Empire; Second Polish Republic
- Branch: Imperial Russian Army; Polish Navy
- Service years: 1918–1939
- Rank: Komandor podporucznik (Lieutenant commander)
- Unit: Polish I Corps in Russia
- Commands: ORP Gryf
- Conflicts: World War I; Polish–Soviet War; World War II; Invasion of Poland; Battle of Danzig Bay

Stefan Kwiatkowski was a Polish commander of the Polish–Soviet War and a recipient of the Silver Cross of the Virtuti Militari. He was known for being killed on the first day of World War II during the Battle of Danzig Bay while commanding the ORP Gryf.

== Biography ==
He was born on 8 November 1894 in Korelicze, Grodno, in the family of Wacław. In 1915 he graduated from the Kiev River School, then he attended the Junkier School, which he did not graduate. In 1918, he was part of the Polish I Corps in Russia, commanded by General Józef Dowbor-Muśnicki and was a standard-bearer of the First Knight's Legion.

In 1919 he joined the emerging Polish Navy as a second lieutenant. He took part in the Polish–Soviet War, initially as a liaison officer of the Riverine Flotilla of the Polish Navy from 24 March 1920 as the commander of the captured transport ship ORP Ataman, on which he participated in the clash near Łomczewo. Later he commanded the tug Champion, which he sank during the retreat on 21 July near Kaczanowicze. From August 1920, he commanded the armed ship ORP Stefan Batory in the Riverine Flotilla. On 30 August 1920 he was decorated by General Józef Haller for participating in the Battle of Warsaw With the Silver Cross of the Order of the Virtuti Militari. The ID of the Cross was made on a piece of printed paper. In 1921 he commanded the armed ship ORP Warneńczyk.

In 1922, he was verified as a naval lieutenant with seniority on 1 June 1919. In the following years, he served, among others, in the command of the Riverine Flotilla, a course officer at the Polish Naval Academy and the commander of ORP Pomorzanin. In the years 1928–1930, he was a navigation officer and then the deputy commander of the training sailing ship ORP Iskra during three consecutive training voyages, including to Cuba and the United States. In 1929, he was promoted to the rank of naval captain. Later, until 1933, he was the deputy commander of the destroyer ORP Wicher. He participated in a cruise to Madeira after Marshal Józef Piłsudski and the Danzig crisis. On 1 January 1935 he was promoted to the rank of second lieutenant commander. From May 1936 to May 1937, he commanded ORP Wilia until March 1939 where he served in the Fleet Command. On 1 April 1939 he became the commander of the minelayer ORP Gryf. On 1 September, during the execution of the Operation Rurka, the ship was attacked in the Gdańsk Bank by Ju 87 dive bombers. Stefan Kwiatkowski was fatally wounded by a fragment of one of the bombs that exploded at the side. He was buried in the cemetery in Hel.

== Awards ==
- Virtuti Militari, SIlver Cross (1921, No. 3942)
- Cross of Valour
- Golden Cross of Merit
- Commemorative medal of the 1918–1921 War
- Medal of the Decade of Regained Independence
- Commemorative Badge of the 1st Polish Corps in Russia
