= Anielin, Złotów County =

Village in Poland

Anielin
- Village
- Location within Poland
- Coordinates: 53°33′22″N 16°51′7″E
- Country: Poland
- Voivodeship: Greater Poland
- County: Złotów
- Gmina: Okonek

Anielin [aˈɲɛlin] is a village in the administrative district of Gmina Okonek, within Złotów County, Greater Poland Voivodeship, in west-central Poland.
