= Jagdgeschwader 25 =

Fighter unit in World War II

- Active: July–November 1943
- Country: Nazi Germany
- Branch: Luftwaffe
- Type: Fighter Aircraft
- Role: Air superiority
- Size: Air Force Wing

Commanders
- Notable commanders: Herbert Ihlefeld

Aircraft flown
- Fighter: Bf 109

Jagdgeschwader 25 (JG 25), sometimes erroneously referred to as Jagdgruppe 25, was a special high-altitude fighter unit that specialized in intercepting the Royal Air Force's (RAF) de Havilland Mosquito light bombers during World War II.

== History ==
On 1 July 1943, Jagdgruppe Nord des ObdL was formed as a high-altitude fighter unit to combat the RAF's Mosquito twin-engine bomber and reconnaissance aircraft. On 15 August 1943 the unit was redesignated Jagdgeschwader 25 and was commanded by Oberstleutnant Herbert Ihlefeld. Both JG 25 (and its sister unit Jagdgeschwader 50) were ultimately unsuccessful in effectively countering the Mosquito and were more profitably used for interception of the US heavy bomber formations during the daylight offensive over Europe in 1943–44. The Geschwader claimed only two aerial victories for the loss of 9 aircraft lost in combat and further 5 losses due to other reasons.

== Commanding officers ==
- Major Herbert Ihlefeld, 21 July 1943 – 30 November 1943
