= Przybysław, Złotów County =

Przybysław
- Village
- Location within Poland
- Coordinates: 53°35′36″N 16°47′29″E
- Country: Poland
- Voivodeship: Greater Poland
- County: Złotów
- Gmina: Okonek
- Population: 40

Przybysław [pʂɨˈbɨswaf] is a village in the administrative district of Gmina Okonek, within Złotów County, Greater Poland Voivodeship, in west-central Poland.

For more on its history, see Złotów County.
