= Jagdgeschwader 103 =

- Active: 7 December 1942 – 15 March 1945
- Country: Nazi Germany
- Branch: Luftwaffe
- Type: Fighter Aircraft
- Role: Fighter pilot training wing
- Size: Air Force Wing

Jagdgeschwader 103 (JG 103) was a Luftwaffe fighter-training-wing of World War II.

It was formed at Bad Aibling from Stab/Jagdfliegerschule 3 (JFS 3) on 7 December 1942 and was disbanded on 15 March 1945. Its commanding officers included Majors Herbert Ihlefeld and Major Hans von Hahn.

== Bibliography ==
- Archambault, C. & Lapierre, P. (January 2000). "Les unités de seconde ligne de la Luftwaffe en France (janvier-août 1944) (2ème partie)" [Second-line Luftwaffe Units in France (January–August 1944)]. Avions: Toute l'Aéronautique et son histoire (in French) (82): 50–57. ISSN 1243-8650.
- Archambault, C. & Lapierre, P. (July 2000). "Les unités de seconde ligne de la Luftwaffe en France (janvier-août 1944) (3ème partie)". Avions: Toute l'Aéronautique et son histoire (in French) (88): 38–47. ISSN 1243-8650.
