= Lubnicki Młyn =

- Settlement
- Location within Poland
- Coordinates: 53°38′7″N 16°52′59″E
- Country: Poland
- Voivodeship: Greater Poland
- County: Złotów
- Gmina: Okonek

Lubnicki Młyn [lubˈnit͡ski ˈmwɨn] is a settlement in the administrative district of Gmina Okonek, within Złotów County, Greater Poland Voivodeship, in west-central Poland.

For more on its history, see Złotów County.
