= Drzewice, Greater Poland Voivodeship =

Drzewice
- Village
- Location within Poland
- Coordinates: 53°37′N 16°49′E
- Country: Poland
- Voivodeship: Greater Poland
- County: Złotów
- Gmina: Okonek
- Population: 70

Drzewice [dʐɛˈvit͡sɛ] is a village in the administrative district of Gmina Okonek, within Złotów County, Greater Poland Voivodeship, in west-central Poland.

For more on its history, see Złotów County.
