= Wojnówko, Złotów County =

Wojnówko
- Village
- Location within Poland
- Coordinates: 53°36′28″N 16°50′16″E
- Country: Poland
- Voivodeship: Greater Poland
- County: Złotów
- Gmina: Okonek
- Population: 50

Wojnówko [vɔi̯ˈnufkɔ] is a village in the administrative district of Gmina Okonek, within Złotów County, Greater Poland voivodeship, in west-central Poland.

For more on its history, see Złotów County.
