= Lubnica, Greater Poland Voivodeship =

Lubnica
- Village
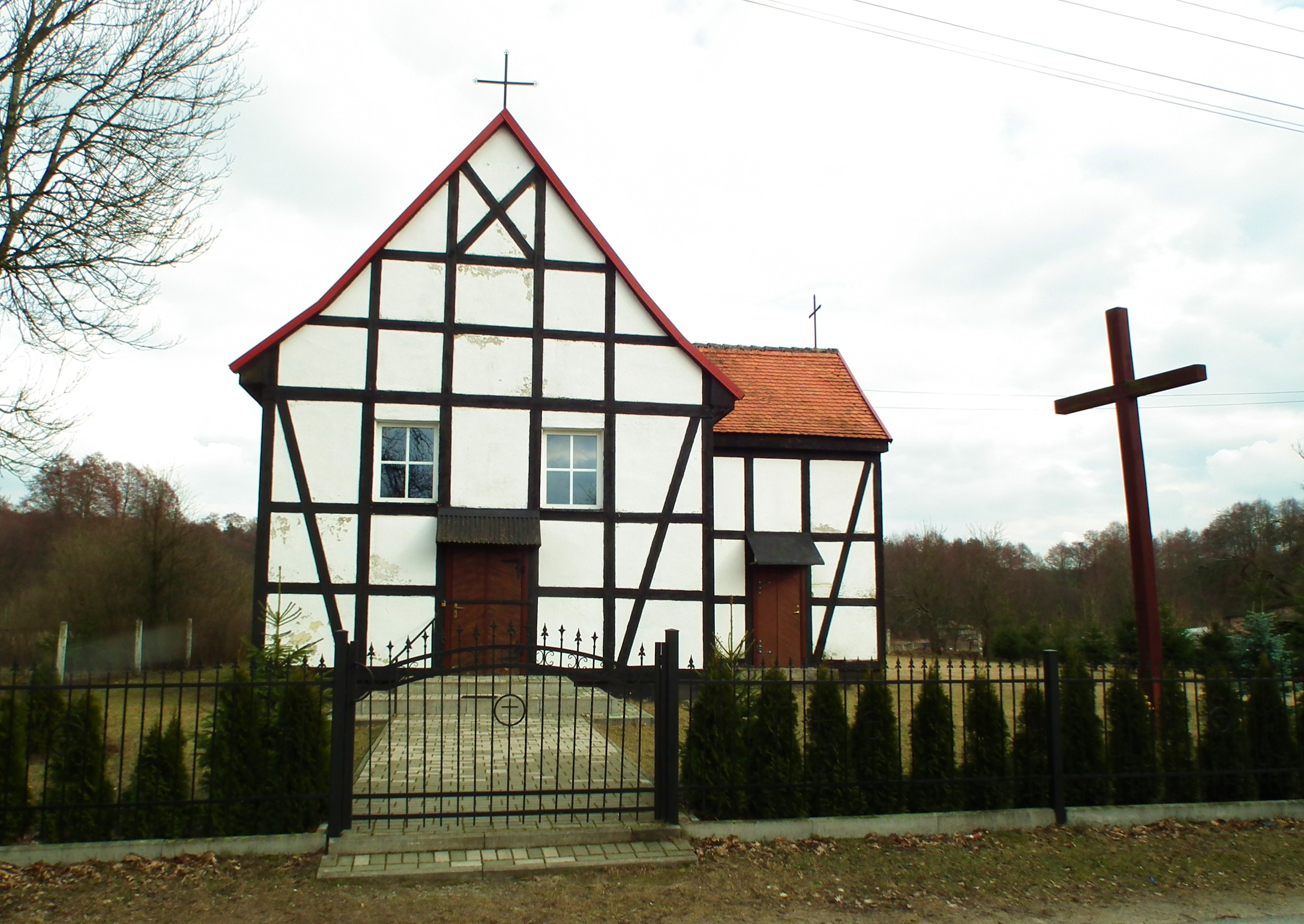
- Church of the Nativity of the Virgin Mary in Lubnica

- Location within Poland
- Coordinates: 53°38′16″N 16°53′8″E
- Country: Poland
- Voivodeship: Greater Poland
- County: Złotów
- Gmina: Okonek

Population
  - Total: 110
- Time zone: UTC+1 (CET)
  - Summer (DST): UTC+2 (CEST)
- Vehicle registration: PZL

Lubnica [lubˈnit͡sa] is a village in the administrative district of Gmina Okonek, within Złotów County, Greater Poland Voivodeship, in northern Poland.
