= Brzozówka, Greater Poland Voivodeship =

Brzozówka
- Village
- Location within Poland
- Coordinates: 53°35′59″N 16°46′5″E
- Country: Poland
- Voivodeship: Greater Poland
- County: Złotów
- Gmina: Okonek
- Population: 80

Brzozówka [bʐɔˈzufka] is a village in the administrative district of Gmina Okonek, within Złotów County, Greater Poland Voivodeship, in west-central Poland.

For more on its history, see Złotów County.
