= Skoki, Złotów County =

Skoki
- Village
- Location within Poland
- Coordinates: 53°36′38″N 16°51′39″E
- Country: Poland
- Voivodeship: Greater Poland
- County: Złotów
- Gmina: Okonek
- Population: 100

Skoki [ˈskɔki] is a village in the administrative district of Gmina Okonek, within Złotów County, Greater Poland Voivodeship, in west-central Poland.

For more on its history, see Złotów County.
