= Gmina Okonek =

Gmina Okonek Okonek Commune
- Gmina
- Flag Coat of arms
- Interactive map of Gmina Okonek
- Coordinates (Okonek): 53°32′N 16°51′E
- Country: Poland
- Voivodeship: Greater Poland
- County: Złotów
- Seat: Okonek

Area
  - Total: 325.88 km^{2} (125.82 sq mi)

Population (2006)
  - Total: 8,909
  - Density: 27.34/km^{2} (70.81/sq mi)
  - Urban: 3,827
  - Rural: 5,082
- Website: http://www.okonek.pl/

Gmina Okonek is an urban-rural gmina (administrative district) in Złotów County, Greater Poland Voivodeship, in west-central Poland. Its seat is the town of Okonek, which lies approximately 23 kilometres (14 mi) north-west of Złotów and 126 km (78 mi) north of the regional capital Poznań.

The gmina covers an area of 325.88 square kilometres (125.8 sq mi), and as of 2006 its total population is 8,909 (out of which the population of Okonek amounts to 3,827, and the population of the rural part of the gmina is 5,082).

== Villages ==
Apart from the town of Okonek, Gmina Okonek contains the villages and settlements of Anielin, Babi Dwór, Borki, Borucino, Brokęcino, Brzozówka, Chwalimie, Ciosaniec, Ciosaniec-Bolkowo, Czersk, Drzewice, Glinki Mokre, Glinki Suche, Kruszka, Lędyczek, Łomczewo, Lotyń, Lubnica, Lubnicki Młyn, Lubniczka, Pniewo, Podgaje, Przybysław, Rydzynka, Skoki, Węgorzewo and Wojnówko.

== Neighbouring gminas ==
Gmina Okonek is bordered by the gminas of Borne Sulinowo, Czarne, Debrzno, Jastrowie, Lipka, Szczecinek and Złotów.
