= Lotyń, Greater Poland Voivodeship =

Lotyń
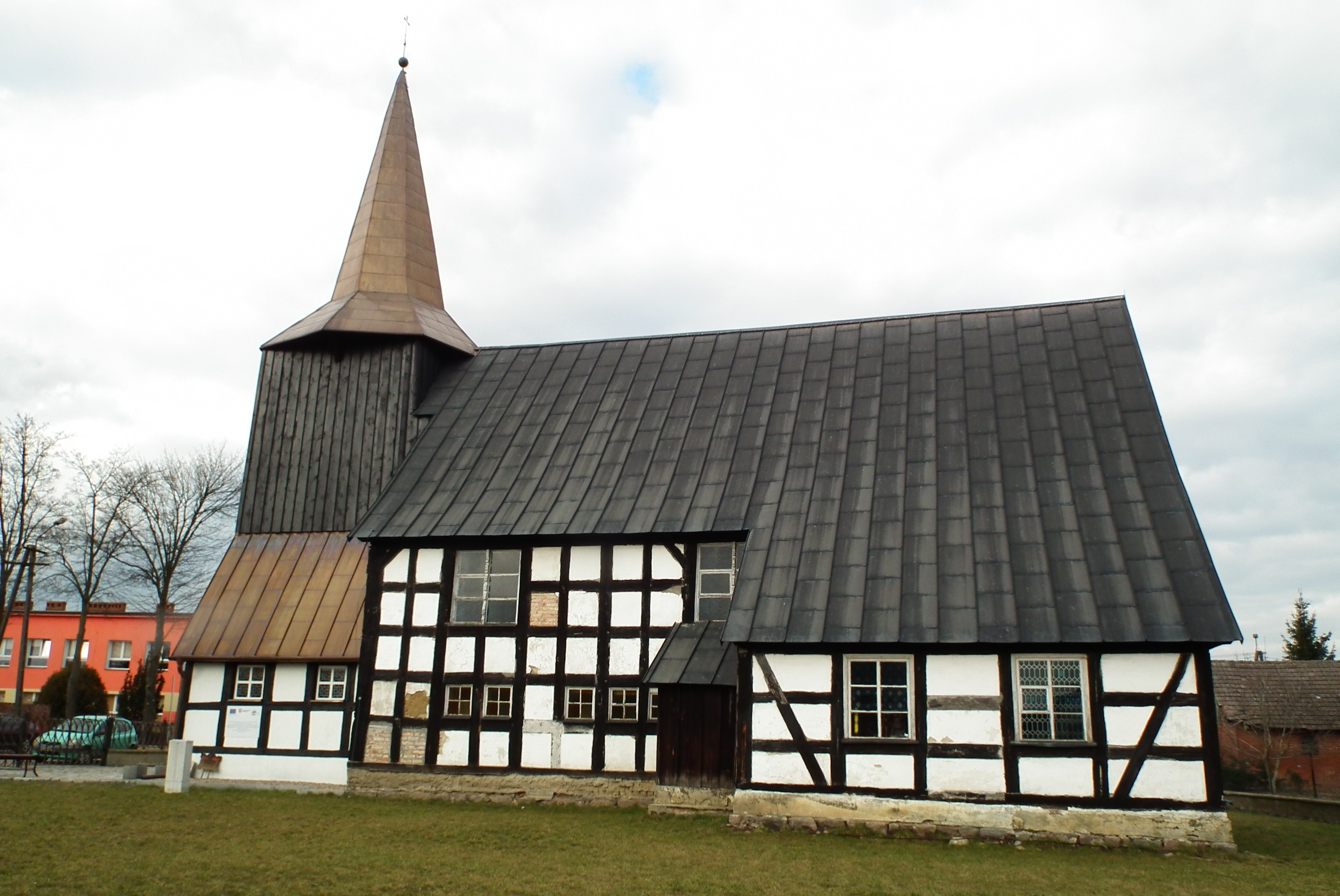
- Local church

- Location within Poland
- Coordinates: 53°36′N 16°48′E
- Country: Poland
- Voivodeship: Greater Poland
- County: Złotów
- Gmina: Okonek

Population
  - Total: 1,000
- Time zone: UTC+1 (CET)
  - Summer (DST): UTC+2 (CEST)
- Vehicle registration: PZL
- Website: http://www.osplotyn.pl/

Lotyń [ˈlɔtɨɲ] (German: Lottin) is a village in the administrative district of Gmina Okonek, within Złotów County, Greater Poland Voivodeship, in north-central Poland.

In the 10th century the area became part of the emerging Polish state, and after the country's fragmentation it was part of the Duchy of Pomerania until 1648, under the Holy Roman Empire. Afterwards it was part of Prussia and Germany, before it was given to Poland following World War II in 1945.

== Notable residents ==
- Ewald Friedrich von Hertzberg (1725–1795), Prussian politician.
