= Ciosaniec-Bolkowo =

- Village
- Location within Poland
- Coordinates: 53°27′46″N 16°42′06″E
- Country: Poland
- Voivodeship: Greater Poland
- County: Złotów
- Gmina: Okonek

Ciosaniec-Bolkowo [t͡ɕɔˈsaɲɛt͡s bɔlˈkɔvɔ] is a village in the administrative district of Gmina Okonek, within Złotów County, Greater Poland Voivodeship, in west-central Poland.

For more on its history, see Złotów County.
