= Czersk, Greater Poland Voivodeship =

Czersk
- Village
- Location within Poland
- Coordinates: 53°33′41″N 16°44′11″E
- Country: Poland
- Voivodeship: Greater Poland
- County: Złotów
- Gmina: Okonek
- Time zone: UTC+1 (CET)
  - Summer (DST): UTC+2 (CEST)
- Vehicle registration: PZL

Czersk (Polish: [t͡ʂɛrsk]) is a village in the administrative district of Gmina Okonek, within Złotów County, Greater Poland Voivodeship, in north-central Poland.

In the 10th century the area became part of the emerging Polish state, and after the country's fragmentation it was part of the Duchy of Pomerania until 1648. Afterwards it was part of Prussia and Germany, before it became again part of Poland following World War II in 1945.
