= Borucino, Greater Poland Voivodeship =

Borucino
- Village
- Location within Poland
- Coordinates: 53°29′10″N 16°47′38″E
- Country: Poland
- Voivodeship: Greater Poland
- County: Złotów
- Gmina: Okonek
- Population: 500

Borucino [bɔruˈt͡ɕinɔ] is a village in the administrative district of Gmina Okonek, within Złotów County, Greater Poland Voivodeship, in west-central Poland.
