= Okonek =

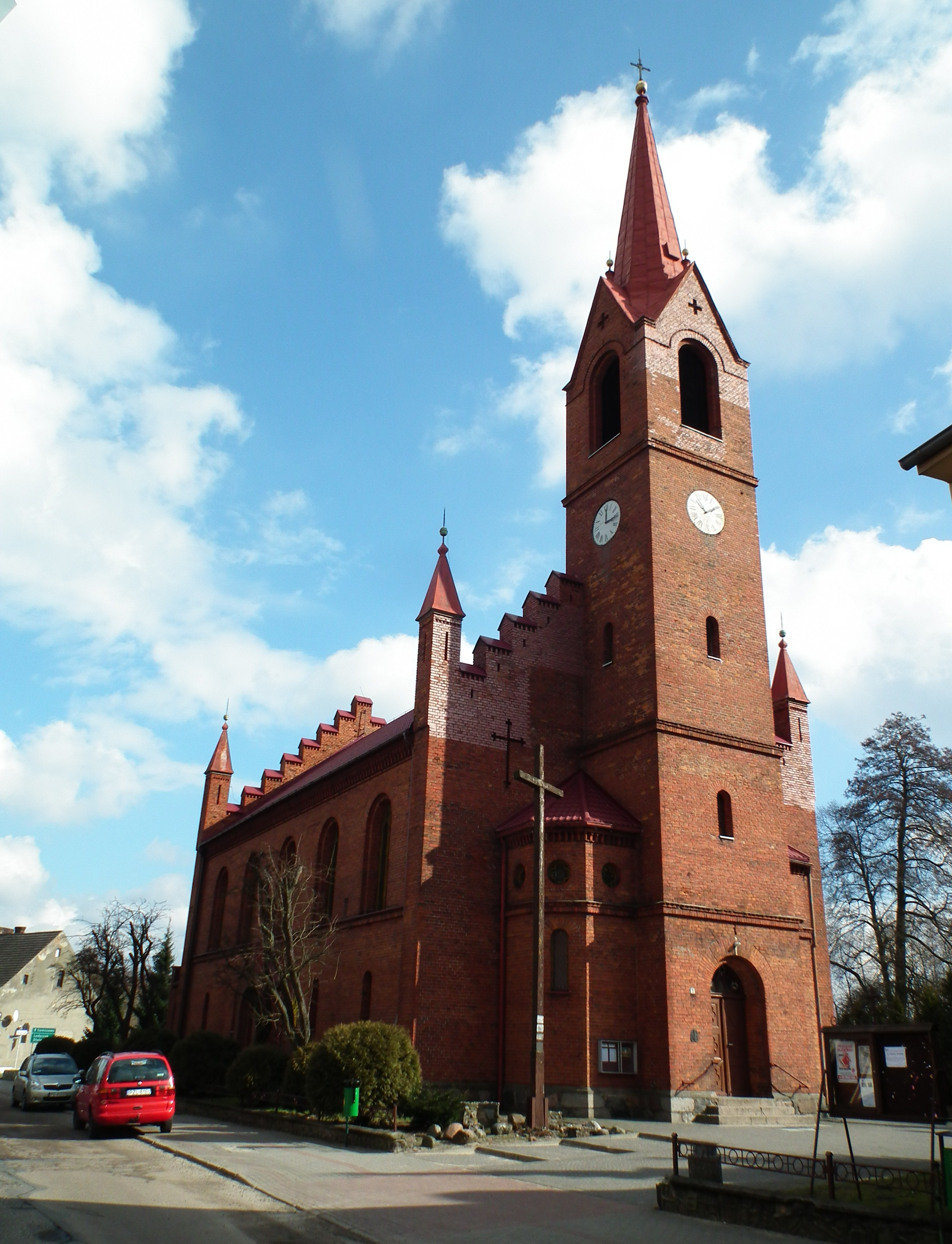
- Church of Our Lady of Redemption of Slaves

- Flag Coat of arms

- Location within Poland
- Coordinates: 53°32′N 16°51′E
- Country: Poland
- Voivodeship: Greater Poland
- County: Złotów
- Gmina: Okonek
- Town rights: 1754

Area
  - Total: 6.01 km^{2} (2.32 sq mi)

Population (2010)
  - Total: 3,855
  - Density: 641/km^{2} (1,660/sq mi)
- Time zone: UTC+1 (CET)
  - Summer (DST): UTC+2 (CEST)
- Postal code: 64-965
- Vehicle registration: PZL
- Website: http://www.okonek.pl/

Okonek [ɔˈkɔnɛk] (German: Ratzebuhr) is a town in Poland, in Złotów County in Greater Poland Voivodeship, with approximately 4,200 inhabitants.

== History ==
The settlement was first mentioned in a document of 1547. In 1597, Duke John Frederick established three annual fairs. Due to its location as the sole Ducal Pomeranian customs point on the trade route from Gdańsk and Königsberg to Germany, it developed an urban character. It was granted town rights in 1754. The town suffered in a Russian invasion during the Seven Years' War. The cloth industry flourished until the Napoleonic Wars.

== Demographics ==
Historical population

Year	Pop.	±%
1871	2,174	—
1880	2,432	+11.9%
1890	2,298	−5.5%
1900	2,245	−2.3%
1910	2,375	+5.8%

Year	Pop.	±%
1925	2,611	+9.9%
1939	2,940	+12.6%
1950	2,156	−26.7%
1960	3,153	+46.2%
2010	3,855	+22.3%
