= Eduard Isken =

German World War II fighter pilot (1918–1997)

- Born: 15 April 1918; Hagendingen, German Empire
- Died: 7 January 1997 (aged 78); Wolfsburg, Germany
- Military career
- Allegiance: Nazi Germany
- Branch: Luftwaffe
- Service years: ?–1945
- Rank: Oberfeldwebel
- Units: JG 77; JGr. 200; JG 53
- Conflicts: World War II: Eastern Front; Defence of the Reich; Operation Bodenplatte
- Awards: Knight's Cross of the Iron Cross

Eduard Isken (15 April 1918 – 7 January 1997) was a Luftwaffe ace and recipient of the Knight's Cross of the Iron Cross during World War II. During his career Eduard Isken was credited with 56 aerial victories.

== Career ==
Isken was born on 15 April 1918 in Hagendingen, at the time in the district of Metz in the Bezirk Lothringen (German Lorraine) of the German Empire. Today Hagendingen is Hagondange in north-eastern France. Isken was posted to the III. Gruppe (3rd group) of Jagdgeschwader 77 (JG 77—77th Fighter Wing) in mid-1940 where he was assigned to the 7. Staffel (7th squadron). The Staffel had been newly formed on 9 August 1940 and was placed under the command of Oberleutnant Wolfdieter Huy. On 7 September, III. Gruppe moved to an airfield at Neuruppin. Initially, the Gruppe was equipped with both Messerschmitt Bf 109 E aircraft as well as captured French Curtiss P-36 Hawk fighters. The Gruppe flew the P-36 until 29 October.

On 6 November 1941, Isken's Bf 109 F-4 was hit in oil cooler by anti-aircraft artillery resulting in a forced landing near Belobek. On 15 January 1942, he made an emergency landing in his Bf 109 F-4 (Werknummer 7138—factory number) at Grammatikowo located near Sovietskyi and was injured in the process.

=== Mediterranean Theater ===
On 23 October 1942, the British Eighth Army launched the Second Battle of El Alamein. Preceding this attack, the Luftwaffe had already planned to replace Jagdgeschwader 27 (JG 27—27th Fighter Wing), which had been fighting in North African theater, with JG 77. In preparation for this rotation, III. Gruppe of JG 77 was moved to Munich on 19 October where it was equipped with the Bf 109 G-2/trop. On 23 and 24 October, the Gruppe moved to Bari in southern Italy. The Gruppe then relocated to Tobruk Airfield on 26 October. The following day, the Gruppe moved to an airfield at Tanyet-Harun.

On 11 December, the United States Army Air Forces (USAAF) 66th Fighter Squadron attacked an Axis forces encampment and intercepted by Luftwaffe Bf 109 fighters and Italian Macchi fighters. In the afternoon, III. Gruppe engaged in combat with Curtiss P-40 Kittyhawk fighters from the Royal Air Force (RAF) No. 112 Squadron. That day, the RAF and USAAF lost or had damaged four P-40 fighters, one of which may have been credited to Isken.

On 12 August 1944, the USAAF XII Tactical Air Command, supported by elements of the RAF, attacked German radar installations in the area of the French Riviera. Defending against this attack, Isken and Obergefreiter Horst Rippert may have shot down the Supermarine Spitfire fighter MJ442 from the No. 232 Squadron piloted by Lieutenant Geoffrey W. Dibb.

On 14 January 1945, Isken was presented the Knight's Cross of the Iron Cross (Ritterkreuz des Eisernen Kreuzes) at the airfield in Nellingen for 50 aerial victories claimed.

== Later life ==
Isken died on 7 January 1997 at the age of 78 in Wolfsburg, Germany.

== Summary of career ==
=== Aerial victory claims ===
According to US historian David T. Zabecki, Isken was credited with 56 aerial victories. Obermaier also lists him with 56 aerial victories, 16 on the Eastern Front and 40 on Western Front, including 17 four-engined heavy bombers, claimed in 946 combat missions. Mathews and Foreman, authors of Luftwaffe Aces — Biographies and Victory Claims, researched the German Federal Archives and found documentation for more than 44 aerial victory claims, plus two further unconfirmed claims. This number includes more than 19 on the Western Front, including two four-engined heavy bombers, and 25 on the Eastern Front.

Victory claims were logged to a map-reference (PQ = Planquadrat), for example "PQ 9876". The Luftwaffe grid map (Jägermeldenetz) covered all of Europe, western Russia and North Africa and was composed of rectangles measuring 15 minutes of latitude by 30 minutes of longitude, an area of about 360 square miles (930 km^{2}). These sectors were then subdivided into 36 smaller units to give a location area 3 km × 4 km (1.9 mi × 2.5 mi) in size.

Chronicle of aerial victories
This and the – (dash) indicates unconfirmed aerial victory claims for which Isken did not receive credit. This and the ? (question mark) indicates information discrepancies listed by Prien, Stemmer, Rodeike, Balke, Bock, Mathews and Foreman.
Claim	Date	Time	Type	Location	Claim	Date	Time	Type	Location
– 7. Staffel of Jagdgeschwader 77 – Operation Barbarossa — 22 June – 5 December 1941
1	25 July 1941	19:40	I-153		8? (Note: This claim is not listed by Mathews and Foreman.)	26 September 1941	—	MiG-3	
2	25 July 1941	19:44	I-153	PQ 9876	9?	26 September 1941	—	MiG-3	
3	29 August 1941	07:03	DB-3	PQ 3756	10	30 September 1941	10:25	MiG-3	PQ 4619
4	4 September 1941	05:55	DB-3		11	30 September 1941	10:35	R-Z? (Note: According to Mathews and Foreman claimed as a Polikarpov R-5.)	
5	4 September 1941	16:55	DB-3		12	5 October 1941	08:10	I-61 (MiG-3)	
6	20 September 1941	07:45	DB-3		13	15 October 1941	09:35	I-61 (MiG-3)	
7	23 September 1941	17:35	MiG-3		14	6 November 1941	07:20	LaGG-3	PQ 3541
– 7. Staffel of Jagdgeschwader 77 – Eastern Front — 6 December 1941 – 15 January 1942
15	4 January 1942	10:35	I-153		17	6 January 1942	12:35	DB-3	
16?	5 January 1942	11:35	I-153	PQ 5678					
– 7. Staffel of Jagdgeschwader 77 – Eastern Front — 1 May – June 1942
18	12 May 1942	17:03	I-16	PQ 6025	21	5 June 1942	04:15	MiG-1	
19	18 May 1942	05:20	I-180 (Yak-7)		22	6 June 1942	12:58	Il-2	PQ 3544
20	19 May 1942	15:25	U-2		23	18 June 1942	15:17	LaGG-3	
– 8. Staffel of Jagdgeschwader 77 – Eastern Front — July 1942
24	5 July 1942	17:20	Yak-1	PQ 66873	? (Note: This claim is not listed by Prien, Stemmer, Rodeike and Bock but is listed by Mathews and Foreman. However, Prien, Stemmer, Rodeike and Bock state that in total twelve aerial victories were claimed by unknown pilots of III. Gruppe.)	23 July 1942	13:45	Yak-1	
?	5 July 1942	17:22	Yak-1		?	24 July 1942	14:40	R-Z	
– 8. Staffel of Jagdgeschwader 77 – Mediterranean Theater, North Africa — 26 October – 31 December 1942
25	4 November 1942	06:00	Hurricane	Sanyet Quotaifiya airfield	27?	11 December 1942	—	P-40	
26	4 November 1942	06:01	Hurricane	3 km (1.9 mi) north of Sanyet Quotaifiya					
– 8. Staffel of Jagdgeschwader 77 – Mediterranean Theater, North Africa — 1 January – May 1943
30	31 January 1943	12:44	P-38	PQ 03 Ost 94164, west of El Hama	—	19 April 1943	—	Spitfire	
31	3 February 1943	16:47	P-40	PQ 03 Ost 86874, Thelepte	—	25 April 1943	—	P-40	
32	4 April 1943	13:55	Spitfire	PQ 13 Ost 06752, Bou Thadi					
– 8. Staffel of Jagdgeschwader 77 – Mediterranean Theater, Italy — June – 25 October 1943
33	24 June 1943	09:55	P-38	PQ 04 Ost 81731, west of Tresnuraghes; 20 km (12 mi) southeast of Lecce	34	24 June 1943	10:02	P-38	PQ 04 Ost 8175, northwest of Oristano vicinity of Lecce
– 2. Staffel of Jagdgruppe 200 – Defense against the Invasion in Southern France — 6 June – 31 August 1944
35	15 June 1944	12:00	P-38	PQ 04 Ost S/DK-5/4, Orange	41	11 August 1944	18:12	P-47	PQ 04 Ost S/DL-5; 35 km (22 mi) southwest of Cassis
36	12 July 1944	10:48	B-24	PQ 04 Ost S/CM-3; 80 km (50 mi) south of Toulon	42	12 August 1944	10:30	Spitfire	PQ 04 Ost S/DN-1/2 northeast of Hyères
37	14 July 1944	09:17	B-17	PQ 04 Ost S/5678; Valence	43	12 August 1944	18:28	P-47	PQ 04 Ost S/BM-7 north of Saint-Maximin
38?	7 August 1944	—	B-25	PQ 04 Ost S/AK	44	14 August 1944	10:23	P-51	PQ 04 Ost S/CM-6/8 north of Saint-Maximin
39?	8 August 1944	—	P-47	PQ 04 Ost S/BJ-2	45?	15 August 1944	07:31	P-38	PQ 04 Ost S/BN-4, north of Toulon
40?	8 August 1944	—	P-47	PQ 04 Ost S/BJ/CJ					
– 13. Staffel of Jagdgeschwader 53 – Defense of the Reich and on the Western Front — 21 July – 31 December 1944
46	29 October 1944	11:45	P-51	PQ 05 Ost US-7 northeast of Karlsruhe					
According to Prien, Balke, Stemmer and Bock, pilots of IV. Gruppe of JG 53 claimed three Republic P-47 Thunderbolt fighters shot down near Donaueschingen on 22 December 1944. Two of these P-47 fighters may be the two missing aerial victories claimed by Isken. These claims are not documented by Mathews and Foreman.
49	24 December 1944	13:00	B-26						
– 13. Staffel of Jagdgeschwader 53 – Operation Bodenplatte — 1 January 1945
50	1 January 1945	—	Auster						
– 13. Staffel of Jagdgeschwader 53 – Claims without a location and date in 1945
According to Prien, Isken claimed five aerial victories in March 1945, among them two Republic P-47 Thunderbolt fighters on one day. In April 1945, Isken claimed his 56th aerial victory over a Boeing B-17 Flying Fortress bomber. These claims are not documented by Mathews and Foreman.

=== Awards ===
- Iron Cross (1939) 2nd and 1st Class
- Honour Goblet of the Luftwaffe on 26 July 1943 as Oberfeldwebel and pilot
- German Cross in Gold on 28 April 1943 as Oberfeldwebel in the 8./Jagdgeschwader 77
- Knight's Cross of the Iron Cross on 14 January 1945 as Oberfeldwebel and pilot in the 13./Jagdgeschwader 53
