= Hagondange =

- Commune
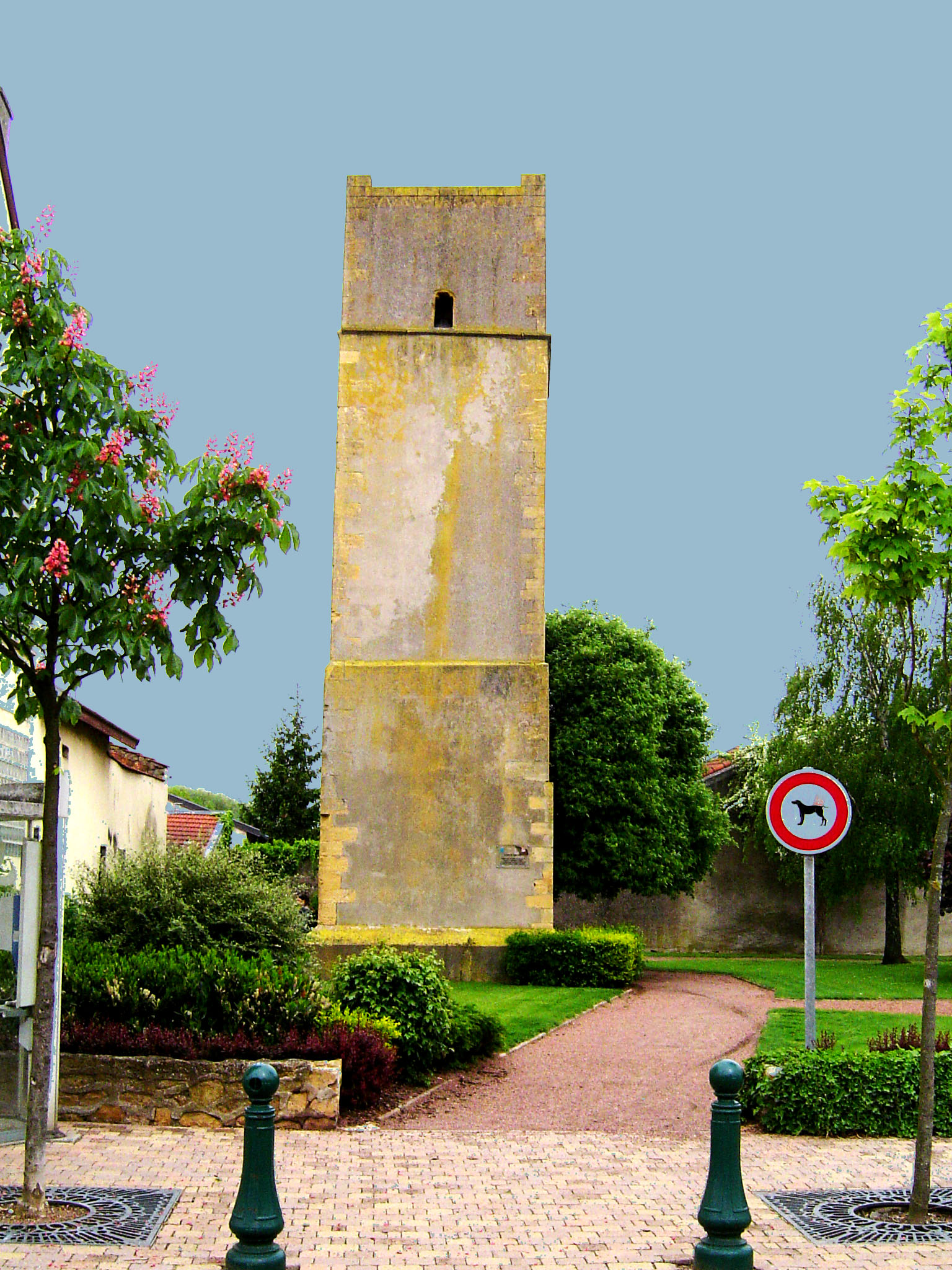
- The 12th century tower in Hagondange

- Coat of arms
- Location of Hagondange
- Location within France Location within Grand Est
- Coordinates: 49°15′18″N 6°10′07″E
- Country: France
- Region: Grand Est
- Department: Moselle
- Arrondissement: Metz
- Canton: Le Sillon Mosellan
- Intercommunality: CC Rives de Moselle

Government
  - Mayor (2020–2026): Valérie Romilly
- Area^{1}: 5.5 km^{2} (2.1 sq mi)
- Highest elevation: 209 m (686 ft)
- Lowest elevation: 154 m (505 ft)
- Population (2023): 9,278
  - Density: 1,700/km^{2} (4,400/sq mi)
- Time zone: UTC+01:00 (CET)
  - Summer (DST): UTC+02:00 (CEST)
- INSEE/Postal code: 57283 /57300
- ^{1} French Land Register data, which excludes lakes, ponds, glaciers > 1 km^{2} (0.386 sq mi or 247 acres) and river estuaries.

Hagondange (French pronunciation: [aɡɔ̃dɑ̃ʒ]; German: Hagendingen; Lorraine Franconian: Hoendéngen/Hoendéng) is a commune in the Moselle department in Grand Est in north-eastern France.

It is located 20 km (12 mi) north of Metz and 20 km (12 mi) south of Thionville.

La Tour de Guet, a tower from the twelfth century, is found within the commune.

== History ==
The commune belong to Luxembourg until the Treaty of the Pyrenees of 1659. This explains why the coat of arms of the Duchy of Luxembourg appears on the coat of arms of the municipality.

By 1817 Hagondange had 275 inhabitants in 45 houses.

Like the other communes of the present Moselle department, Hagondange was annexed to the German Empire from 1871 to 1918. Hagondange is renamed Hagendingen. This is a period of prosperity for the municipality which experienced a real industrial and demographic boom from 1910. While the population in 1900 was 350, it was 1,727 ten years later.

The Second World War and the Annexation will long be remembered. Many young men who were forced into the German armies never returned. The commune was liberated on 7 September 1944 by the Third United States Army, thus escaping the last American bombings.

== Population ==
Historical population
Year	Pop.	±% p.a.
1968	10,567	—
1975	10,048	−0.72%
1982	9,091	−1.42%
1990	8,222	−1.25%
1999	8,675	+0.60%
2007	9,212	+0.75%
2012	9,428	+0.46%
2017	9,242	−0.40%
2023	9,278	+0.06%
Source: INSEE

== Notable people ==
- Eduard Isken (1918–1997) was a Luftwaffe fighter pilot and flying ace during World War II.

== See also ==
- Communes of the Moselle department
