= Gabriel Fabricy =

- Born: c. 1725; Saint-Maximin, Kingdom of France
- Died: January 13, 1800; Rome, Papal States
- Occupations: biblical scholar, archaeologist and dominican friar
- Writing career
- Language: Italian
- Notable works: Des Titres primitifs de la Révélation, ou considérations critiques sur la pureté et l’intégrité du texte original des livres saints de l’ancien Testament (1772)

Gabriel Fabricy was a French biblical scholar, archaeologist and dominican friar.

== Biography ==
Gabriel Fabricy was born at Saint-Maximin, in the Provence, about 1725. As a young man he entered the Dominican Order. After his service as Provincial of the order in France, he came to Rome around 1760. He spent many years there as one of the theologians officially attached to the famous Biblioteca Casanatense. He was a member of the Arcadian Academy. Among his writings are Censoris theologi Diatribe, qua bibliographiae antiquariae et sacrae critices capita aliquot illustrantur (Rome, 1782, 8vo). He entered upon the study of Phoenician antiquities and literature, but did not live to complete his plans; the partial fruit of his labors appears in De Phoeniciae Litteraturae Fontibus (Rome, 1803, 2 volumes, 8vo). Perhaps his best work is Des Titres primitifs de la Révélation, ou considérations critiques sur la pureté et l’intégrité du texte original des livres saints de l’ancien Testament (Rome, 1772, 2 volumes, 8vo), which is still of value in Biblical criticism. The author examines fully the character of that portion of the original text of the Old Testament which is still preserved; and he defends the reading of the text according to the Masoretic system as superior to any other that could be proposed.

Fabricy was in correspondence with a collaborator of Benjamin Kennicott, Paul Jakob Bruns, and had sent him information about Hebrew biblical manuscripts in the Casanatense Library.

== Bibliography ==
- Conroy, Charles (2004). William Johnstone (ed.). "The biblical work of Alexander Geddes against the background of contemporary Catholic biblical scholarship in continental Europe". The Bible and the Enlightenment. A Case Study—Alexander Geddes (1737-1802). London: T&T Clark: 135–156.

== Notes ==
Attribution:

- This article incorporates public domain material from McClintock, John; Strong, James (1867–1887). Cyclopædia of Biblical, Theological and Ecclesiastical Literature. Harper and Brothers.
