= Joachim Kirschner =

German World War II fighter pilot

- Joachim Kirschner
- Born: 7 June 1920; Niederlössnitz, Saxony, Germany
- Died: 17 December 1943 (aged 23); Metković, Independent State of Croatia
- Military career
- Allegiance: Nazi Germany
- Branch: Luftwaffe
- Service years: 1939–1943
- Rank: Hauptmann (captain)
- Units: JG 3, JG 27
- Commands: 5./JG 3, III./JG 27
- Conflicts: See battles World War II: Western Front; Siege of Malta; Eastern Front; Kuban bridgehead; Battle of Kursk; Defense of the Reich
- Awards: Knight's Cross of the Iron Cross with Oak Leaves

Joachim Kirschner (7 June 1920 – 17 December 1943) was a German Luftwaffe military aviator and fighter ace during World War II. He is credited with 188 aerial victories achieved in 635 combat missions. This figure includes 168 aerial victories on the Eastern Front, and further 20 victories over the Western Allies, including three heavy bombers. He was "ace-in-a-day" four times, shooting down five or more aircraft on a single day.

Born in Niederlössnitz, Kirschner grew up in the Weimar Republic and Nazi Germany. He joined the military service in the Luftwaffe in 1939. Following flight training, he was posted to Jagdgeschwader 3 (JG 3—3rd Fighter Wing). Flying with this wing, Kirschner claimed his first aerial victory on 20 August 1941 fighting the Royal Air Force over the Netherlands. In early 1942, he fought in the Mediterranean theater during the Siege of Malta. In May, his unit was transferred to the Eastern Front where he was made Staffelkapitän (squadron leader) of 5. Staffel (5th squadron) of JG 26 in August 1942. Following his 51st aerial victory, he was nominated for the Knight's Cross of the Iron Cross which he received on 23 December 1942. On 27 April 1943, Kirschner claimed his 100th aerial victory. After claiming his 170th aerial victory, he was awarded the Knight's Cross of the Iron Cross with Oak Leaves on 2 August 1943. In October 1943, he was appointed Gruppenkommandeur (group commander) of IV. Gruppe of Jagdgeschwader 27 (JG 27—27th Fighter Wing) which was fighting over Greece and the Balkans. On 27 December 1943, Kirschner was shot down by fighters of the 57th Fighter Group and bailed out safely but was later killed by Yugoslav Partisans.

== Early life and career ==
Kirschner was born on 7 June 1920 in Niederlössnitz, at the time in the Free State of Saxony of the Weimar Republic. He was the son of Andreas J. Kirschner, an insurance accountant. On 26 August 1939, he joined the military service with the Luftwaffe. From 1 October to 14 November, Kirschner served with 2./Flieger-Ausbildungs-Regiment 51 (2nd Company of 51st Flight Training Regiment) and then attended the Air War School Klotzsche until 30 June 1940. On 1 July, he was transferred to the Jagdfliegerschule 5 where he was trained as a fighter pilot. (Note: Flight training in the Luftwaffe progressed through the levels A1, A2 and B1, B2, referred to as A/B flight training. A training included theoretical and practical training in aerobatics, navigation, long-distance flights and dead-stick landings. The B courses included high-altitude flights, instrument flights, night landings and training to handle the aircraft in difficult situations.) There, he was promoted to Leutnant on 1 February 1941.

== World War II ==
World War II in Europe had begun on Friday 1 September 1939 when German forces invaded Poland. Kirschner joined the Ergänzungsgruppe of Jagdgeschwader 3 (JG 3—3rd Fighter Wing) on 9 May 1941. The Ergänzungsgruppe of JG 3, a supplementary training group, was formed in April 1941 in Krakau, present-day Kraków, under the command of Major Alfred Müller. The Gruppe was made up of two Staffeln (squadrons): The first squadron, designated 1. (Ergänzungsstaffel) or 1. Erg./JG 3, under the command of Haupmann Hans-Curt Graf von Sponeck, son of Hans Graf von Sponeck, was detached in January 1942 and a new created in February 1942 under command of Oberleuntnant Heinz Bohatsch. The second squadron, designated 2. (Ergänzungsstaffel) or 2. Erg./JG 3, was placed under the command of Oberleutnant Erwin Neuerburg. In July, the Ergänzungsgruppe was ordered to the Netherlands, providing fighter escort for German shipping on the English Channel. While the Stab (headquarters unit) and 2. Staffel were based at Amsterdam-Schiphol Airfield, 1. Staffel operated from an airfield at Bergen aan Zee near Alkmaar. On 20 August, ten Royal Air Force (RAF) Bristol Blenheim bombers, escorted by Supermarine Spitfire fighters, attacked 1. Staffel's airfield at Bergen aan Zee. Defending against this attack, Kirschner claimed his first aerial victory when he shot down one of the escorting Spitfire fighters. In total, he flew 27 combat missions while assigned to the Ergänzungsgruppe.

On 22 December, he was transferred to 5. Staffel of JG 3. At the time, this squadron was headed by Oberleutnant Harald Moldenhauer and subordinated to II. Gruppe (2nd group) of JG 3 commanded by Hauptmann Karl-Heinz Krahl. At the time of Kirschner's posting to II. Gruppe, the unit was based at Wiesbaden-Erbenheim Airfield for a period of rest and replenishment after it had returned to Germany from the Eastern Front. In January 1942, II. Gruppe was ordered to move to Sicily. The Luftwaffe concentrated many units in Sicily, placed them under the command of II. Fliegerkorps (2nd Air Corps), in order to defeat the RAF in the Siege of Malta. Equipped with the Messerschmitt Bf 109 F-4 trop, the Gruppe and their equipment travelled by train to Bari in southern Italy. There the aircraft were reassembled and flown to Comiso Airfield, Sicily. The transfer was completed on 24 January and the Gruppe was then placed under the command of the Geschwaderstab of Jagdgeschwader 53 (JG 53—53rd Fighter Wing) which was already stationed there. On 26 March, II. Gruppe escorted Junkers Ju 87 to Malta. On this mission, Kirschner shot down a Spitfire fighter 10 kilometers (6.2 miles) northwest of La Valetta. This aerial victory was claimed during the action which resulted in the sinking the British submarine HMS P39. II. Gruppe flew its last combat mission over Malta on 25 April. The following day, the unit began its relocation to Pilsen where they arrived on 27 April.

=== Eastern Front ===
II. Gruppe had been ordered to the Eastern Front in preparation for Case Blue, the strategic summer offensive in southern Russia. While based at Pilsen, Hauptmann Kurt Brändle took over command of the Gruppe after Krahl had been killed in action over Malta. The Gruppe was then deployed on the left wing of Army Group South where it was based at Chuhuiv near the Donets on 19 May. On 21 May, II. Gruppe fought over the combat area of the 6th Army northeast of Kharkov. There, Kirschner claimed a Ilyushin DB-3 bomber shot down, his first aerial victory on the Eastern Front.

=== Squadron leader ===
JG 3 emblem

In late August 1942, II. Gruppe was withdrawn from the front and ordered to Neuhausen near Königsberg, present-day Guryevsk, for reequipment with the Bf 109 G-2. There, Moldenhauer, the commander of 5. Staffel was transferred. In consequence, Kirschner became the designated Staffelkapitän (squadron leader) of 5. Staffel. On 9 September, the Gruppe was ordered to Smolensk where it was subordinated to Jagdgeschwader 51 (JG 51—51st Fighter Wing).

He received the Honor Goblet of the Luftwaffe (Ehrenpokal der Luftwaffe) and the German Cross in Gold (Deutsches Kreuz in Gold) after claiming 51 aerial victories. On 27 April 1943, Kirschner was credited with his 100th aerial victory over a Douglas A-20 Havoc named "Boston". He was the 37th Luftwaffe pilot to achieve the century mark. In early May, II. Gruppe was moved to Kharkiv, from where they operated over the combat area east of Belgorod, operating in this area from 2 to 6 May. On 6 May, the Gruppe claimed twelve aerial victories, including four by Kirschner, taking his total to 113.

Kirschner claimed his 150th aerial victory on 5 July 1943, the first day of Operation Citadel, the German offensive phase of the Battle of Kursk. Preempting the German attack, Soviet aircraft attacked the German airfields in the early morning. Fighting in the aerial battles that day, Kirschner claimed nine aerial victories, his third "ace-in-a-day" achievement. That day, II. Gruppe intercepted Il-2 ground attack aircraft from 66 ShAP (Shturmovoy Aviatsionnyy Polk—Ground-attack Aviation Regiment) and 735 ShAP. Following his 170th aerial victory he received the Knight's Cross of the Iron Cross with Oak Leaves (Ritterkreuz des Eisernen Kreuzes mit Eichenlaub) on 2 August 1943. The presentation was made by Adolf Hitler at the Wolf's Lair, Hitler's headquarters in Rastenburg, present-day Kętrzyn in Poland. Five other Luftwaffe officers were presented with awards that day by Hitler, Hauptmann Egmont Prinz zur Lippe-Weißenfeld, Hauptmann Heinrich Ehrler, Hauptmann Manfred Meurer, Hauptmann Werner Schröer, Oberleutnant Theodor Weissenberger were also awarded the Oak Leaves, and Major Helmut Lent received the Swords to his Knight's Cross with Oak Leaves.

=== Defense of the Reich ===
In early August 1943, II. Gruppe was withdrawn from the Eastern Front for service in Defense of the Reich on the Western Front. The Gruppe spent one-month training in northern Germany before they arrived at the Schiphol Airfield near Amsterdam in the Netherlands on 12 September. While based at Uetersen Airfield, the Gruppe received the Bf 109 G-6 which was equipped with Y-Control for fighters, a system used to control groups of fighters intercepting United States Army Air Forces (USAAF) bomber formations. On 24 September, II. Gruppe for the first time engaged in combat with USAAF bombers. Guided by Y-Control, the Gruppe intercepted approximately 80 to 100 Boeing B-17 Flying Fortress bombers over sea. During this encounter, Kirschner shot down one of the B-17 bombers.

On 27 September, the USAAF VIII Bomber Command attacked the industrial areas and shipyards of Emden. Drop tank equipped Republic P-47 Thunderbolt for the first time escorted the bombers all the way to the target in Germany. The attack force was detected at 10:20 west of Terschelling heading east. At 10:33, II. Gruppe was scrambled. In the following encounter, Kirschner claimed a P-47 fighter shot down. (Note: Sources differ with respect to the type of aircraft claimed that day. According to Mathews and Foreman, the aircraft was a Republic P-47 Thunderbolt. This is also the type of aircraft listed by Prien, Stemmer, Rodeike and Bock in the 2008 edition of The Fighter Units of the German Air Force 1934 to 1945—Part 10/II—Defense of the Reich—1 January to 31 December 1943. However, in the 2003 edition of Jagdgeschwader 3 "Udet" in WWII: II./JG 3 in Action with the Messerschmitt Bf 109, also by Prien and Stemmer, this claim is listed as a Boeing B-17 Flying Fortress.) On 2 October, VIII Bomber Command again headed for Emden. Defending against this attack, Kirschner claimed a B-17 bomber shot down. The following day, 140 Martin B-26 Marauder bombers, escorted by P-47 and Spitfire fighters, attacked the German airfields at Schiphol, Woensdrecht and Haamstede. II. Gruppe was unable to reach the bombers as they were engaged by the P-47 and Spitfire fighters. During this dogfight, Kirschner shot down one of the Spitfire fighters. On 4 October, VIII Bomber Command attacked Frankfurt am Main. German defenses failed to prevent the bombing. Luftwaffe pilots only claimed 14 aerial victories that day, including a B-17 bomber shot down by Kirschner. This was also Kirschner's last aerial victory in Defense of the Reich. He was transferred on 18 October, command of 5. Staffel was then passed on to Hauptmann Heinrich Sannemann.

=== Group commander and death ===
On 18 October, Kirschner was made Gruppenkommandeur (group commander) of IV. Gruppe of Jagdgeschwader 27 (JG 27—27th Fighter Wing) after the former commander Hauptmann Rudolf Sinner had been transferred on 13 September. In the intermediate period, two officers had led the Gruppe, Oberleutnant Dietrich Boesler, who was killed on 10 October, and by Oberleutnant Alfred Buk. At the time, IV. Gruppe was based at the Kalamaki Airfield in Athens, Greece and operated in the Mediterranean theatre. Kirschner claimed his first aerial victories in this theater of operations on 23 October. In two combat missions, he claimed the destruction of a Lockheed P-38 Lightning and two Spitfires. Two days later, he was credited with shooting down a P-38 fighter northwest of Cape of Rodon.

On 17 December 1943, Kirschner was shot down in his Bf 109 G-6 (Werknummer 20618—factory number), 25 kilometers (16 miles) east of Metković over the Independent State of Croatia. According to Bernstein, his victors were either Lieutenant Warren Shaw, who was credited with the destruction of one Bf 109 or by the Lieutenants Charles Leaf and Hugh Barlow, who were credited with a shared victory from the USAAF 57th Fighter Group. Kirschner bailed out safely and landed by parachute between the villages of Bjelojevići and Donje Hrasno. He was killed by a firing squad from the Yugoslav Partisan 29th Hercegovina Division at Metković. The Germans sent out search parties from Mostar airfield immediately after his downing, with one being ambushed by the Partisans on 19 December. As late as mid-February 1944, a battalion of the 7th SS Volunteer Mountain Division Prinz Eugen was fruitlessly searching for Kirschner. According to a report filed by SS-Sturmbannführer Walter Moreth of the SS-Gebirgs-Flak-Abteilung 7 (7th SS Mountain Anti-Aircraft Battalion), Kirscher was found with his throat slit and gouged out eyes. He was buried near Bjelojevići, approximately 9 kilometers (5.6 miles) south of Stolac.

== Summary of career ==
=== Aerial victory claims ===
According to US historian David T. Zabecki, Kirschner was credited with 188 aerial victories. Spick also lists Kirschner with 188 aerial victories claimed in approximately 600 combat missions, and a mission-to-claim ratio of 3.19. This figure includes 167 aerial victories on the Eastern Front, and further 21 victories over the Western Allies, including two heavy bombers. Obermaier also states that he was credited with 188 aerial victories with 168 on the Eastern Front and 20 over the Western Allies. According to Stockert, Kirschner also claimed 188 aerial victories plus further 22 ground victories achieved in 635 combat missions. Mathews and Foreman, authors of Luftwaffe Aces — Biographies and Victory Claims, researched the German Federal Archives and found records for 181 aerial victory claims, plus five further unconfirmed claims. This figure includes 162 aerial victories on the Eastern Front and 19 over the Western Allies.

Victory claims were logged to a map-reference (PQ = Planquadrat), for example "PQ 39362". The Luftwaffe grid map (Jägermeldenetz) covered all of Europe, western Russia and North Africa and was composed of rectangles measuring 15 minutes of latitude by 30 minutes of longitude, an area of about 360 square miles (930 km^{2}). These sectors were then subdivided into 36 smaller units to give a location area 3 km × 4 km (1.9 mi × 2.5 mi) in size.

Chronicle of aerial victories
This and the ♠ (Ace of spades) indicates those aerial victories which made Kirschner an "ace-in-a-day", a term which designates a fighter pilot who has shot down five or more airplanes in a single day. This and the ? (question mark) indicates information discrepancies listed by Prien, Stemmer, Rodeike, Bock, Mathews and Foreman.
Claim	Date	Time	Type	Location	Claim	Date	Time	Type	Location
– 1. Staffel of the Ergänzungsjagdgruppe of Jagdgeschwader 3 – Western Front — 15 April 1941 – 1 February 1942
1	20 August 1941	15:35	Spitfire	40–50 km (25–31 mi) west of Bergen aan Zee					
– 5. Staffel of Jagdgeschwader 3 "Udet" – Mediterranean Theater — 7 January – 26 April 1942
2	6 March 1942	13:50	Spitfire	10 km (6.2 mi) northwest of La Valetta vicinity of Malta					
– 5. Staffel of Jagdgeschwader 3 "Udet" – Eastern Front — 26 April – July 1942
3	21 May 1942	04:50	DB-3	1 km (0.62 mi) northwest of Baworowka	13	13 July 1942	08:30	Yak-1	10 km (6.2 mi) east of Kajukow
4? (Note: According to Mathews and Foreman this claim is unconfirmed.)	22 May 1942	16:07	MiG-1	1 km (0.62 mi) west of Volchansk	14	13 July 1942	08:32	DB-3	Kamensk-north airfield
5	29 May 1942	04:59	MiG-1	1 km (0.62 mi) southeast of Olchowatka	15	22 July 1942	18:07	Yak-1	north of Rybinskij
6	31 May 1942	19:22	MiG-1	6 km (3.7 mi) southwest of Volchansk	16	22 July 1942	18:22	Il-2	3 km (1.9 mi) southeast of Kololowsk
7	13 June 1942	17:47	MiG-1	10 km (6.2 mi) northwest of Kupiansk	17?	22 July 1942	18:28	LaGG-3	southeast of Kololowsk
8?	13 June 1942	17:58	Il-2	15 km (9.3 mi) west of Kupiansk	18?	22 July 1942	18:28	LaGG-3	southeast of Kololowsk
9	30 June 1942	10:12	LaGG-3	10 km (6.2 mi) east of Kshen	19	26 July 1942	11:25	Yak-1	5 km (3.1 mi) south of Kalach
10	4 July 1942	18:45	Il-2	3 km (1.9 mi) south of Vorenezh	20	26 July 1942	11:27	Yak-1	south of Kalach
11	8 July 1942	17:05	U-2	Lipezk airfield	21	26 July 1942	11:28	Yak-1	south of Kalach
12	9 July 1942	18:20	LaGG-3	4 km (2.5 mi) east of Terbury	22	27 July 1942	17:42	LaGG-3	PQ 39362
– 2. Staffel of Jagdgeschwader 3 "Udet" – Eastern Front — August 1942
23	5 August 1942	07:24	LaGG-3	PQ 35 Ost 49589, Tinguta railway station	29	13 August 1942	18:02	Il-2	PQ 35 Ost 39271, Kalach
24	9 August 1942	09:50	LaGG-3	PQ 35 Ost 39332, Kalach; 10 km (6.2 mi) southwest of Kalach	30	17 August 1942	16:50	Il-2	PQ 35 Ost 30891; 20 km (12 mi) north of Pitomnik
25	9 August 1942	09:54	LaGG-3	PQ 35 Ost 39333, Kalach; 10 km (6.2 mi) southwest of Kalach	31	17 August 1942	16:52	Il-2	PQ 35 Ost 40774, Katschalinskaja
26	9 August 1942	10:12	Pe-2	PQ 35 Ost 39424, Platonowskij; 15 km (9.3 mi) southwest of Kalach	32	17 August 1942	16:56	Il-2	PQ 35 Ost 40782, Katschalinskaja
27	9 August 1942	10:22	LaGG-3	PQ 35 Ost 39333, Kalach; 10 km (6.2 mi) southwest of Kalach	33	20 August 1942	04:53	DB-3	PQ 35 Ost 49753, Stalingrad
28	13 August 1942	17:54	LaGG-3	PQ 35 Ost 39434; 10 km (6.2 mi) south of Pitomnik Airfield	34	21 August 1942	17:41	LaGG-3	PQ 35 Ost 49121; 20 km (12 mi) north of Gumrak
– 5. Staffel of Jagdgeschwader 3 "Udet" – Eastern Front — September 1942 – 3 February 1943
35	13 September 1942	07:04	LaGG-3	PQ 47593	44	12 October 1942	16:29	LaGG-3	PQ 28812
36	23 September 1942	10:25	Pe-2	PQ 47681	45	15 October 1942	09:23	LaGG-3	PQ 38364; 30 km (19 mi) southeast of Kotelnikovo
37	23 September 1942	10:27	LaGG-3	PQ 47673	46	15 October 1942	09:25	LaGG-3	PQ 38363; 30 km (19 mi) southeast of Kotelnikovo
38	28 September 1942	10:22	LaGG-3	PQ 28171	47	17 October 1942	15:57	Il-2	PQ 28634
39	4 October 1942	17:21	Il-2	PQ 29677	48	22 October 1942	12:09	LaGG-3	PQ 48311
40	4 October 1942	17:24	LaGG-3	PQ 29674	49	22 October 1942	12:11	LaGG-3	PQ 48173
41	5 October 1942	11:31	LaGG-3	PQ 38532	50	29 October 1942	09:36	LaGG-3	PQ 28114
42	11 October 1942	17:30	Er-2	PQ 38163; 20 km (12 mi) east-southeast of Kotelnikovo	51	29 October 1942	09:48	LaGG-3	PQ 29762
43	11 October 1942	17:35	MiG-1	PQ 28223	52	8 November 1942	14:24	LaGG-3	PQ 17824
– 5. Staffel of Jagdgeschwader 3 "Udet" – Eastern Front — 4 February – 3 August 1943
53	20 February 1943	10:04	Yak-4	PQ 34 Ost 89242, Borowskoje; 20 km (12 mi) southeast of Lysychansk	112	6 May 1943	13:48	MiG-1	PQ 35 Ost 61641, south of Belgorod; 20 km (12 mi) south of Belgorod
54	22 February 1943	10:40	LaGG-3	PQ 34 Ost 88493, Matveev Kurgan; 20 km (12 mi) north of Taganrog	113	6 May 1943	14:07	Boston	PQ 35 Ost 61662, Schtschebekino; 10 km (6.2 mi) north of Volchansk
55	22 February 1943	10:48	Yak-7	PQ 34 Ost 88493, Matveev Kurgan; 35 km (22 mi) south of Jalisawehino	114	7 May 1943	16:02	Spitfire	PQ 34 Ost 75264, southwest of Krymskkaja vicinity of Krymsk
56	22 February 1943	15:40	LaGG-3	PQ 34 Ost 88631, northwest of Pokrowskoje; 20 km (12 mi) north of Taganrog	115	7 May 1943	18:27	LaGG-3	PQ 34 Ost 75261, southwest of Krymskkaja vicinity of Krymsk
57	27 February 1943	07:37	LaGG-3	PQ 34 Ost 79311, east of Alexandrowka; 10 km (6.2 mi) northeast of Barwenkowo	116♠	8 May 1943	05:32	LaGG-3	PQ 34 Ost 86773, south of Troizkaja east of Kijewskoje
58	9 March 1943	08:10	Yak-1	PQ 34 Ost 98592, vicinity of B. Krepskaja; 30 km (19 mi) west-northwest of Taganrog	117♠	8 May 1943	11:56	Spitfire	PQ 34 Ost 75271, southwest of Bakanskij; 20 km (12 mi) west-northwest of Novorossiysk
59	9 March 1943	15:25	LaGG-3	PQ 34 Ost 88491, Matveev Kurgan; 30 km (19 mi) north of Taganrog	118♠	8 May 1943	12:12	LaGG-3	PQ 34 Ost 75234, west of Krymskaja vicinity of Krymsk
60	13 March 1943	10:20	La-5	PQ 35 Ost 70452, south of Kurilowka train station 15 km (9.3 mi) southeast of Kupiansk	119♠	8 May 1943	12:13	Il-2	PQ 34 Ost 75262, south of Krymskaja vicinity of Krymsk
61	13 March 1943	10:21	La-5	PQ 35 Ost 70453, south of Kurilowka train station 15 km (9.3 mi) southeast of Kupiansk	120♠	8 May 1943	14:20	LaGG-3	PQ 34 Ost 85111, northeast of Krymskaja vicinity of Merschskaja
62	13 March 1943	10:27	Il-2	PQ 35 Ost 70614, south of Kupiansk; 25 km (16 mi) south of Kupiansk	121♠	8 May 1943	14:24	LaGG-3	PQ 34 Ost 75234, west of Krymskaja vicinity of Krymsk
63	18 March 1943	15:14	Il-2	PQ 35 Ost 61892, Chotomlja; 25 km (16 mi) west-southwest of Vovchansk	122♠	8 May 1943	18:10	LaGG-3	PQ 34 Ost 75233, northwest of Krymskaja southwest of Abinsk
64	21 March 1943	14:34	Yak-1	PQ 34 Ost 98483, north of Rostov; 25 km (16 mi) north of Sinjawka	123	9 May 1943	12:34	Yak-1	PQ 34 Ost 76864, south of Anastassijewskaja north of Kijewskoje
65	21 March 1943	14:59	LaGG-3	PQ 34 Ost 98823, south of Rostov region of Rostov	124	9 May 1943	16:53	Il-2	PQ 34 Ost 85111, northeast of Krymskaja vicinity of Merschskaja
66	25 March 1943	08:07	MiG-1	PQ 34 Ost 88294, west of Marijewka; 15 km (9.3 mi) southeast of Jalisawehino	125	9 May 1943	16:59	Yak-1	PQ 34 Ost 76874, Gostagajewskaja vicinity of Kijewskoje
67	25 March 1943	08:16	LaGG-3	PQ 34 Ost 98372, vicinity of Milostj-Kurakino; 30 km (19 mi) northwest of Sinjawka	126	10 May 1943	16:00	Yak-1	PQ 34 Ost 85161, north of Cholmskaja southwest of Abinsk
68	25 March 1943	14:00	LaGG-3	PQ 34 Ost 98584, west of Rostov region of Sinjawka	127	10 May 1943	16:08	Il-2	PQ 34 Ost 75232, north of Krymskaja vicinity of Krymsk
69	29 March 1943	12:05	R-5	PQ 35 Ost 80834, south of Starobilsk; 10 km (6.2 mi) south of Starobilsk	128	10 May 1943	16:13	Spitfire	PQ 34 Ost 76892, north of Kijewskoje vicinity of Kijewskoje
70	30 March 1943	13:30	Il-2	PQ 44 Ost 09362, east of Djatschkino	129	14 May 1943	16:45	P-39	PQ 34 Ost 75261, east of Kijewskoje
71	31 March 1943	05:48	La-5	PQ 34 Ost 88631, north of Taganrog; 20 km (12 mi) north of Taganrog	130?	20 May 1943	13:20	LaGG-3	
72	31 March 1943	05:55	LaGG-3	PQ 34 Ost 88661, north of Taganrog; 15 km (9.3 mi) north of Taganrog	131	23 May 1943	06:53	La-5	PQ 35 Ost 62781, east of Iwnja; 20 km (12 mi) south of Oboyan
73	11 April 1943	05:16	I-16	PQ 34 Ost 85111, east of Krymskaja	132	23 May 1943	06:55	La-5	PQ 35 Ost 62739, Krijzowo train station 20 km (12 mi) south of Oboyan
74	11 April 1943	05:24	I-16	PQ 34 Ost 86746, vicinity of Trojzkaja	133	30 May 1943	06:22	Boston	PQ 35 Ost 70, west of Kupiansk; 15 km (9.3 mi) southeast of Kupiansk
75	11 April 1943	12:05	LaGG-3	PQ 34 Ost 85114, east of Krymskaja; Mertschskaja	134	1 June 1943	05:04	La-5	PQ 35 Ost 62873, northeast of Bogorodizkoje; 10 km (6.2 mi) north of Prokhorovka
76	12 April 1943	10:21	P-39	PQ 34 Ost 86274, Nowo Dsherelijewskaja west of Andrejewskaja	135	2 June 1943	05:22	Yak-4	PQ 35 Ost 62853, vicinity of Jelinkowo train station 25 km (16 mi) northeast of Prokhorovka
77	15 April 1943	08:36	LaGG-3		136	2 June 1943	05:34	La-5	PQ 35 Ost 61133, east of Bogatyj; 10 km (6.2 mi) west of Prokhorovka
78	15 April 1943	08:56	LaGG-3	PQ 34 Ost 85343, Nowo Nikolajewskaja region of Leprasorium	137	4 June 1943	17:52	Yak-1	PQ 35 Ost 70313, vicinity of Malyi Burluk; 30 km (19 mi) east-northeast of Malinovka
79	16 April 1943	14:46	P-39		138	8 June 1943	05:18	La-5	PQ 35 Ost 60262, vicinity of Petschenegi; 20 km (12 mi) east-northeast of Malinovka
80	16 April 1943	14:54	P-40	east of Kijewskoje	139	9 June 1943	11:00	Yak-1	PQ 35 Ost 60224, vicinity of Saporoshnoje; 20 km (12 mi) north of Malinovka
81	17 April 1943	17:37	LaGG-3	PQ 34 Ost 86791, Mingrelskaya northeast of Mingrelskaya	140	14 June 1943	03:26? (Note: According to Mathews and Foreman claimed at 03:36.)	Il-2	PQ 35 Ost 60441, east of Limm; 20 km (12 mi) north of Andrejevka
82	17 April 1943	17:43	I-16	PQ 34 Ost 86874, east of Mingrelskaya region of Staraya Kolonka	141	14 June 1943	05:25	La-5	PQ 35 Ost 60442, east of Limm; 20 km (12 mi) north of Andrejevka
83	18 April 1943	06:08	LaGG-3	PQ 34 Ost 85344, northeast of Gelendzhik south of Shene	142	16 June 1943	03:55	LaGG-3	PQ 35 Ost 70174, southeast of Petschenegi; 30 km (19 mi) east-southeast of Malinovka
84	18 April 1943	16:44	I-153? (Note: According to Mathews and Foreman claimed as a Curtiss P-40 Warhawk.)	PQ 34 Ost 75433, east of Novorossiysk; 10 km (6.2 mi) north of Kabardinka	143	20 June 1943	15:19	La-5	PQ 35 Ost 61233, southeast of Prokhorovka; 20 km (12 mi) southeast of Prokhorovka
85♠	20 April 1943	11:50	LaGG-3	PQ 34 Ost 75433, east of Novorossiysk; 10 km (6.2 mi) north of Kabardinka	144	28 June 1943	09:53	Yak-1	PQ 35 Ost 61212, east of Werchopenje southwest of Prokhorovka
86♠	20 April 1943	11:52	Il-2	PQ 34 Ost 75423, Novorossiysk region of Novorossiysk	145	28 June 1943	10:00	Yak-1	PQ 35 Ost 62894, vicinity of Prokhorovka; 25 km (16 mi) east-northeast of Prokhorovka
87♠	20 April 1943	11:54	Il-2	PQ 34 Ost 75451, southwest of Novorossiysk; Black Sea, 15 km (9.3 mi) southwest of Kabardinka	146	30 June 1943	17:26	Yak-1	PQ 35 Ost 70174, southeast of Petschenegi; 30 km (19 mi) east-southeast of Malinovka
88♠	20 April 1943	16:01	LaGG-3	PQ 34 Ost 75723, south of Anapa over sea vicinity of Novorossiysk	147	3 July 1943	16:47	La-5	PQ 35 Ost 70353, Woloskaja-Balakleika; 20 km (12 mi) north of Izum
89♠	20 April 1943	16:02	LaGG-3	PQ 34 Ost 75771, south of Anapa over sea vicinity of Novorossiysk	148	3 July 1943	16:52	La-5	PQ 35 Ost 70344, Wolochoff Jar; 20 km (12 mi) north-northeast of Balakleya
90♠	20 April 1943	16:04	Boston	PQ 34 Ost 75454, southwest of Novorossiysk; Black Sea, 30 km (19 mi) west of Gelendzhik	149♠? (Note: This claim is not listed by Mathews and Foreman.)	5 July 1943	03:31	Il-2	PQ 35 Ost 60234, Bolshaja Babka
91♠	20 April 1943	16:06	LaGG-3	PQ 34 Ost 75453, south of Novorossiysk; Black Sea, 15 km (9.3 mi) southwest of Kabardinka	150♠	5 July 1943	03:40	Il-2	PQ 35 Ost 61844, northeast of Kharkiv; 25 km (16 mi) northeast of Kharkiv
92♠	20 April 1943	16:08	Il-2	PQ 34 Ost 75442, southwest of Novorossiysk; Black Sea, 20 km (12 mi) southwest of Novorossiysk	151♠	5 July 1943	03:41	Yak-1	PQ 35 Ost 61841, northeast of Kharkiv; 25 km (16 mi) northeast of Kharkiv
93	21 April 1943? (Note: According to Mathews and Foreman claimed on 21 April 1943.)	18:28	Boston	10 km (6.2 mi) north of Kabardinka	152♠	5 July 1943	03:44	Il-2	PQ 35 Ost 60142, northeast of Kharkiv; 25 km (16 mi) east-northeast of Kharkiv
94	23 April 1943	05:12	LaGG-3	PQ 34 Ost 75372, south of Anapa over sea vicinity of Gelendzhik	153♠	5 July 1943	04:08	La-5	PQ 35 Ost 60193, northeast of Kharkiv; 15 km (9.3 mi) southeast of Kharkiv
95	23 April 1943	05:17	LaGG-3	PQ 34 Ost 75392, southeast of Anapa over sea vicinity of Moldawanka	154♠	5 July 1943	18:06	Il-2	PQ 35 Ost 61353, west of Belgorod; 15 km (9.3 mi) east-northeast of Belgorod
96	23 April 1943	14:38	Il-2	PQ 34 Ost 75424, west of Novorossiysk vicinity of Novorossiysk	155♠	5 July 1943	18:17	Il-2	PQ 35 Ost 61472, southwest of Belgorod; 5 km (3.1 mi) south of Belgorod
97	23 April 1943	14:39	I-16	PQ 34 Ost 75423, Novorossiysk vicinity of Novorossiysk	156♠	5 July 1943	18:24	Il-2	PQ 35 Ost 61623, southeast of Belgorod; 20 km (12 mi) southeast of Belgorod
98	24 April 1943	05:39	I-16	PQ 34 Ost 85151, west of Abinskaja; Abinsk-Achtyrskaja	157♠	5 July 1943	18:32	Il-2	PQ 35 Ost 61651, southeast of Belgorod; 15 km (9.3 mi) northwest of Vovchansk
99	27 April 1943	17:25	P-39	PQ 34 Ost 86783, north of Mingrelskaya northwest of Mingrelskaya	158	6 July 1943	17:31	Yak-1	PQ 35 Ost 61241, north of Belgorod; 10 km (6.2 mi) south of Prokhorovka
100	27 April 1943	17:33	Boston? (Note: According to Mathews and Foreman claimed as a Lavochkin-Gorbunov-Gudkov LaGG-3.)	PQ 34 Ost 85123, south of Mingrelskaya vicinity of Sswobodnyj	159	6 July 1943	17:43	Il-2	PQ 35 Ost 61484, southeast of Belgorod; 15 km (9.3 mi) east-southeast of Belgorod
101	27 April 1943	17:34	LaGG-3? (Note: According to Mathews and Foreman claimed as a Douglas A-20 Havoc "Boston".)	PQ 34 Ost 85123, south of Mingrelskaya vicinity of Cholmskaja	160	6 July 1943	17:50	La-5	PQ 35 Ost 61634, west of Schtschekekino; 20 km (12 mi) north of Vovchansk
102	27 April 1943	17:36	Boston	PQ 34 Ost 85243, west of Georgije Afipskaja vicinity of Sswobodnyj	161♠	7 July 1943	03:44	Il-2	PQ 35 Ost 61623, southeast of Belgorod; 20 km (12 mi) southeast of Belgorod
103	28 April 1943	16:21	Yak-1	PQ 34 Ost 85113, northeast of Mertschanskaja vicinity of Mertschanskaja	162♠	7 July 1943	03:50	Il-2	PQ 35 Ost 61484, east of Borissowka; 15 km (9.3 mi) east-southeast of Belgorod
104	28 April 1943	16:25	Yak-1	PQ 34 Ost 85142, west of Abinskaja west of Abinsk	163♠	7 July 1943	04:02	Il-2	PQ 35 Ost 61623, vicinity of Toplinka train station 20 km (12 mi) southeast of Belgorod
105	28 April 1943	16:32	Yak-1	PQ 34 Ost 85112, northeast of Mertschanskaja; Abinsk-Achtyrskaja	164♠	7 July 1943	12:26	Yak-1	PQ 35 Ost 61162, southeast of Werchopenje; 15 km (9.3 mi) southwest of Prokhorovka
106	29 April 1943	05:31	LaGG-3	PQ 34 Ost 85111, northeast of Krymskaja west of Abinsk	165♠	7 July 1943	19:46	La-5	PQ 35 Ost 61864, Stary Ssaltow; 15 km (9.3 mi) southwest of Bely Kolodez
107	29 April 1943	05:40	LaGG-3	PQ 34 Ost 85142, west of Abinskaja west of Abinsk	166	8 July 1943	04:09	La-5	PQ 35 Ost 70153, Ssrednij-Burluk; 15 km (9.3 mi) northwest of Valuijki
108	29 April 1943	10:06	Yak-1	PQ 34 Ost 85191, southwest of Cholmskaja vicinity of Krymsk	167	10 July 1943	17:12	Yak-1	PQ 35 Ost 62883, northeast of Prokhorovka; 20 km (12 mi) northeast of Prokhorovka
109	29 April 1943	10:18	Yak-1	PQ 34 Ost 75262, south of Krymskaja vicinity of Sswobodnyj	168	10 July 1943	17:16	Yak-1	PQ 35 Ost 62882, Prokhorovka; 20 km (12 mi) northeast of Prokhorovka
110	6 May 1943	13:25	LaGG-3	PQ 35 Ost 71853, southwest of Waluiki; 25 km (16 mi) west of Urasowo	169	11 July 1943	09:40	Yak-1	PQ 35 Ost 61212, east of Werchopenje southwest of Prokhorovka
111	6 May 1943	13:29	LaGG-3	PQ 35 Ost 71761, west of Chatneje; 15 km (9.3 mi) east-southeast of Bely Kolodez	170	12 July 1943	16:58	Yak-1	PQ 35 Ost 62794, Bogorodizkoje; 15 km (9.3 mi) northwest of Prokhorovka
– 5. Staffel of Jagdgeschwader 3 "Udet" – Defense of the Reich — 1 September – 18 October 1943
171	24 September 1943	17:18	B-17	PQ 05 Ost S/FF-6 over sea	174	3 October 1943	12:24	Spitfire	PQ 05 Ost S/GJ-6, west of Zandvoort
172	27 September 1943	11:10	P-47?	PQ 05 Ost S/BP-8 south of Borkum	175	4 October 1943	12:20	B-17	PQ 05 Ost S/LK-1; Amsberg
173?	2 October 1943	—	B-17						
– IV. Gruppe of Jagdgeschwader 27 – Mediterranean Theater — 18 October – 17 December 1943
176	23 October 1943	09:05	P-38	west-northwest of Vlorë	183	15 November 1943	11:28	P-38	west of Arachova
177	23 October 1943	13:02	Spitfire	east of Cetinje	184	15 November 1943	11:32	P-38	west of Arachova
178	23 October 1943	13:04	Spitfire	south-southwest of Podgorica	185	15 November 1943	13:17	P-38	east of Aegina
179	25 October 1943	13:19	P-38	PQ 14 Ost 9231, northwest of Cape of Rodon	186	16 November 1943	13:20	P-38	northwest of Amfissa
180	1 November 1943	13:32	Hurricane	16 km (9.9 mi) west of Bar	187	17 November 1943	12:48	P-38	southwest of Piraeus
181	1 November 1943	13:35	P-40	30 km (19 mi) south of Bar	188	17 November 1943	13:03	B-25	west of Disporia
182	15 November 1943	11:24	B-25	south of Livadeia					

=== Awards ===
- Iron Cross (1939)
  - 2nd Class (27 January 1942)
  - 1st Class (12 April 1942)
- Front Flying Clasp of the Luftwaffe for Fighter Pilots in Gold (2 June 1942)
- Honor Goblet of the Luftwaffe on 21 December 1942 as Leutnant and pilot
- German Cross in Gold on 3 December 1942 as Leutnant in the 5./Jagdgeschwader 3
- Knight's Cross of the Iron Cross with Oak Leaves
  - Knight's Cross on 23 December 1942 as Leutnant and Staffelführer of the 5./Jagdgeschwader 3 "Udet"
  - 267th Oak Leaves on 2 August 1943 as Oberleutnant and Staffelkapitän of the 5./Jagdgeschwader 3 "Udet"
