= Wolf-Dietrich Huy =

German World War II fighter pilot

- Huy as a Hauptmann
- Born: 2 August 1917; Freiburg im Breisgau, German Empire
- Died: 13 July 2003 (aged 85); Gernsbach, Germany
- Military career
- Allegiance: Nazi Germany
- Branch: Luftwaffe
- Rank: Hauptmann (captain)
- Unit: JG 77
- Conflicts: World War II
- Awards: Knight's Cross of the Iron Cross with Oak Leaves

Wolf-Dietrich "Wolfdieter" Huy (2 August 1917 – 13 July 2003) was a former Luftwaffe fighter ace and recipient of the Knight's Cross of the Iron Cross with Oak Leaves during World War II.

== Early life and career ==
Huy was born on 2 August 1917 in Freiburg im Breisgau, at the time in the Grand Duchy of Baden of the German Empire. On 1 April 1935, he joined the Reichsmarine, which was renamed to Kriegsmarine on 1 June 1935, as a naval cadet of "Crew 35" (the incoming class of 1935). He received his military basic training in the 2nd company in the 2nd department of the standing ship division of the Baltic Sea in Stralsund. (Note: 2nd company—2. Kompanie) (Note: 2nd department—II. Abteilung) (Note: standing ship division—Schiffsstammdivision) He was then transferred to the school ship Gorch Fock and then to the light cruiser Karlsruhe. He sailed on Karlsruhe's fifth training cruise, which started on 21 October 1935 in Kiel and ended on 13 June 1936. The journey took him and her crew to Tenerife, São Tomé, Lobito, Durban, Port Victoria on the Seychelles, Batavia present-day Jakarta, Iloilo City on the Philippines, Hong Kong, various Japanese ports, Dutch Harbor on the Aleutian Islands, San Diego, through the Panama Canal and via Saint Thomas and Pontevedra back to Kiel. Huy then attended the main cadet course at the Naval Academy Mürwik. (Note: main cadet course—Hauptlehrgang für Fähnriche)

Encouraged by Kurt Aßmann, later an Admiral in the Kriegsmarine, Huy volunteered for flight training. On 1 October 1937, he was transferred to the Luftwaffe and promoted to Leutnant (second lieutenant) on 1 January 1938. Following flight and fighter pilot training at the Jagdfliegerschule Werneuchen, (Note: Flight training in the Luftwaffe progressed through the levels A1, A2 and B1, B2, referred to as A/B flight training. A training included theoretical and practical training in aerobatics, navigation, long-distance flights and dead-stick landings. The B courses included high-altitude flights, instrument flights, night landings, and training to handle the aircraft in difficult situations.) Huy was posted to Trägergruppe II.(Jäger)/186 in July 1939 where he was assigned to 6. Staffel (6th squadron). The Trägerjagdgruppe (Carrier Fighter Group), was destined to be stationed on the aircraft carrier Graf Zeppelin which was never completed. II./186 (T) initially consisted of two squadrons, 4./186 (T) equipped with the Junkers Ju 87 dive bomber, (Note: The suffix 'T' denotes Träger (carrier) in German use.) and 6./186 (T), a fighter squadron equipped with the Messerschmitt Bf 109 B, the carrier variant Bf 109 T-1 was not available, and trained at Travemünde on a mockup carrier landing deck.

== World War II ==
World War II in Europe began on 1 September 1939 when German forces invaded Poland. In preparation, 6./186 (T) had been moved to Brüsterort, near Königsberg on 24 August. In the early morning hours of 1 September, 6./186 (T) flew its first combat missions, providing fighter protection for 4./186 (T) attacking the naval base of the Polish Navy at Hel and for the old German battleship Schleswig-Holstein bombarding the Polish military transit depot at Westerplatte in the Free City of Danzig on the Baltic Sea. The next, II./186 (T) flew further bomber escort missions and was withdrawn from this theater on 6 September, relocating to Hage, East Frisia.

JG 77 insignia

On 15 September, Huy was appointed Gruppenadjutant, the assisting officer, helping the commanding officer of II.(J)/186, Hauptmann Heinrich Seeliger, with unit administration. On 1 December, for his service he was awarded the Iron Cross 2nd Class (Eisernes Kreuz zweiter Klasse). For the Battle of France, II.(J)/186 was initially subordinated to IV. Fliegerkorps (4th Air Corps), flying combat missions during the German invasion of the Netherlands. On 24 May, the Gruppe moved to Antwerp. From Antwerp, II.(J)/186 flew missions during the Battle of Dunkirk. Here Huy claimed his first aerial victory on 31 May, a Supermarine Spitfire shot down on a fighter escort mission for Luftwaffe bombers attacking Dunkirk. The next day, Huy was promoted to Oberleutnant (first lieutenant).

On 2 June, II.(J)/186 received orders to move to Aalborg, Norway and then to Gardermoen where they arrived on 4 June. On 16 June, the Gruppe moved to Trondheim Airfield. Following the decision by Adolf Hitler to halt work on the aircraft carrier Graf Zeppelin, II./186 (T) was redesignated on 5 July and became the III. Gruppe of Jagdgeschwader 77 (JG 77—77th Fighter Wing). On 9 August 1940, Huy was selected to become the first Staffelkapitän (squadron leader) of 7. Staffel of JG 77. On 13 August, 7. Staffel was formed at Döberitz and equipped with factory new Bf 109 aircraft. Initially, the plan was to equip the Staffel with captured Curtiss P-36 Hawk fighters.

=== Balkan and Battle of Crete ===
In preparation for Operation Marita, the German invasion of Greece, II. and III. Gruppe of JG 77 was moved to Deta in western Romania on 1 April 1941, completing the relocation by 4 April. German forces invaded Greece on 6 April. That day, III. Gruppe flew its first combat mission in this theater, escorting Ju 87 dive bombers from Sturzkampfgeschwader 77 (StG 77—77th Dive Bomber Wing) to Belgrad. On this mission, Huy strafed two aircraft parked on an airfield. The damage inflicted was observed by his wingman, Eduard Isken. The next day, the Gruppe was ordered to an airfield named Sofia-Vrba located approximately halfway between Radomir and Sofia to augment the VIII. Fliegerkorps (8th Air Corps) commanded by Generaloberst Wolfram Freiherr von Richthofen. The Gruppe then followed the German advance to Skopje on 10 April. On 14 April, III. Gruppe moved to Prilep and then to Axioupoli followed by another relocation to Korinos on 16 April.

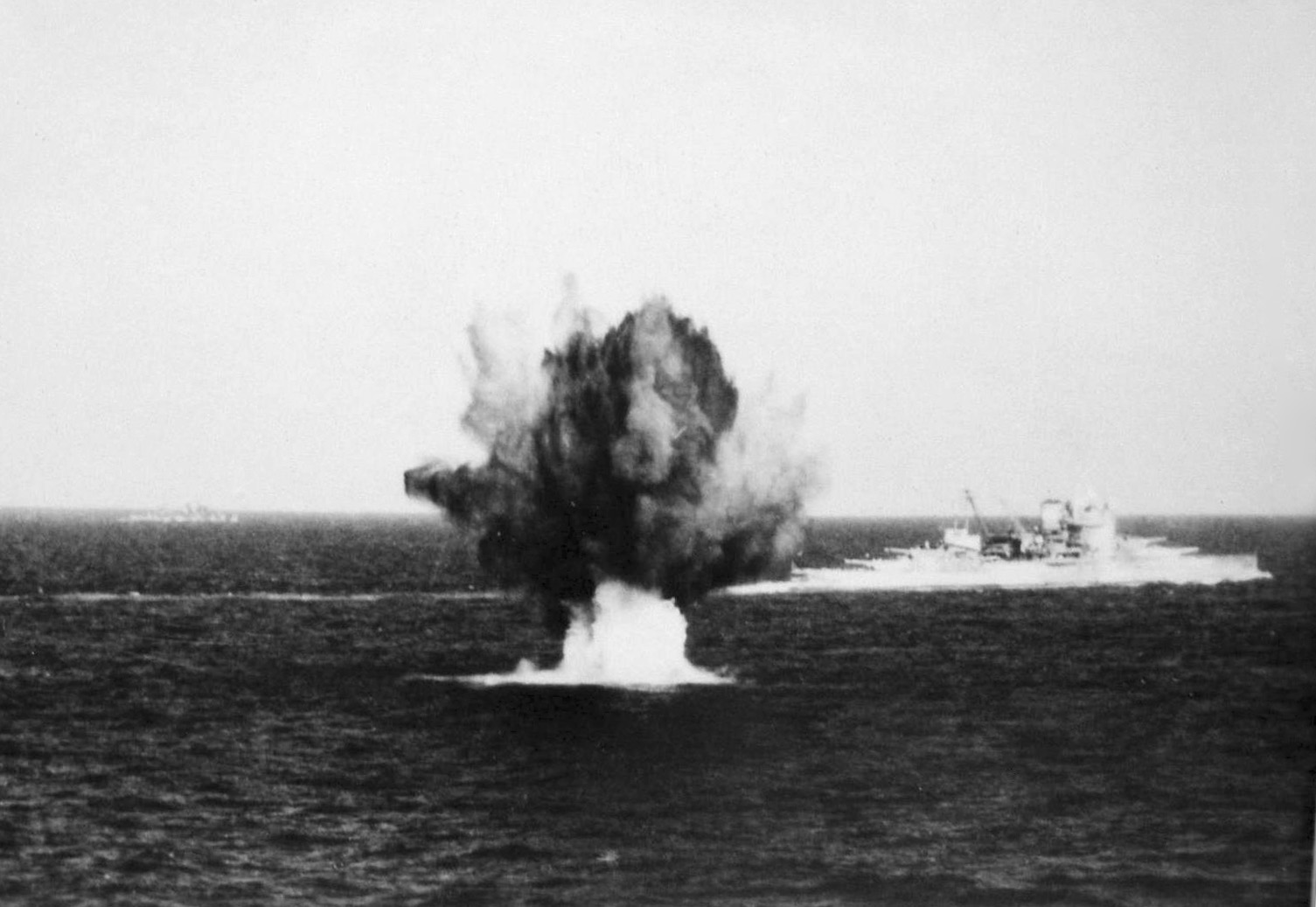
Warspite under attack in the Mediterranean, 1941

On 17 April, the Invasion of Yugoslavia ended in an unconditional surrender. III. Gruppe attacked three ships off Volos. Huy, who led the attack, scored a hit on a freighter assessed at 4,000 gross register tons (GRT). On 21 April, Huy participated on a ground attack mission against the airfield at Elefsina. The following morning, III. Gruppe moved to Almyros. From 15:25 to 16:15, Huy led 7. Staffel in an attack on troop transport shipping off Athens. On this mission, Huy scored a hit on a freighter of approximately 3,000 GRT. On 25 April, III. Gruppe attacked Allied shipping sailing between Nafplio and Chalcis. During these missions, Huy scored a direct hit on a freighter of 4,000 GRT. Two days later, Huy and Unteroffizier Johann Pichler scored hits on a freighter off Nauplio claimed to be 20,000 GRT, probably the SS Slamat of 11,636 GRT which was later sunk. On 1 May, Huy was awarded the Iron Cross 1st Class (Eisernes Kreuz erster Klasse).

In preparation for the Battle of Crete, III. Gruppe was ordered to Molaoi on 11 May. On 22 May, Huy led 7. Staffel of JG 77 which attacked the British battleship HMS Warspite between 12:13 and 12:48. Oberleutnant Huth, Feldwebel Heinz Furth and Unteroffizier Pichler each had hit the Warspite and damaged her. The pilots had misidentified the ship and had reported an attack on HMS Valiant. On 29 May, Huy scored a direct hit on HMS Dido. On 1 June, III. Gruppe was withdrawn from this theater of operations and began transferring to Vienna where they arrived on 4 June. Here, the Gruppe was equipped with the Bf 109 F-4, retaining a few older Bf 109 E aircraft.

=== Eastern Front ===
In preparation for Operation Barbarossa, the German invasion of the Soviet Union, III. Gruppe was moved to Bucharest and was located in the sector of Heeresgruppe Süd (Army Group South). III. Gruppe arrived in Bucharest on 16 June. Four days later, III. Gruppe moved to Roman. On 2 July in support of the German and Romanian Operation München, III. Gruppe moved to an airfield at Iași.

Huy was awarded the Knight's Cross of the Iron Cross (Ritterkreuz des Eisernen Kreuzes) on 5 July 1941, awarded principally for his actions in the Balkans and Crete. The award was presented by Generalleutnant Kurt Pflugbeil. Both Huy and the Gruppenkommandeur (group commander), Major Alexander von Winterfeldt, received the Knight's Cross at the Iași airfield. On 2 August, von Winterfeldt was transferred. In consequence, Huy was briefly given command of the Gruppe until he fell ill with Malaria. Command of the Gruppe was then given to Oberleutnant Kurt Ubben while coammand of 7. Staffel was passed to Oberleutnant Joachim von Wehren. On 16 October, Huy claimed three aerial victories, including his twentieth in total, when he shot down two Polikarpov I-153 fighters and a single Ilyushin DB-3 bomber.

At the start of 1942, Huy was credited with 30 aerial victories while III. Gruppe fought in the Crimea. On 23 January 1942, Huy's Bf 109 F-4 was damaged in aerial combat resulting in a forced landing at Tarpowka. His opponent may have been the Soviet pilot from 32 IAP, (Note: IAP—Istrebitelny Aviatsionny Polk (Fighter Aviation Regiment—Истребительный Авиационный Полк)) Starshiy Leytenant Mikhail Avdeyev. A Soviet offensive aimed at relieving Sevastopol ensued and Oberleutnant Huy claimed the Gruppe's 600th victory on 11 March, and his thirty-eight victory, but was then mistakenly shot down and wounded by German anti-aircraft fire. During his convalescence, Huy was briefly replaced by Hauptmann Erich Friedrich, then by Oberleutnant Friedrich-Wilhelm Strakeljahn, and lastly by Oberleutnant Walther Lücke.

Huy was awarded the Knight's Cross of the Iron Cross with Oak Leaves (Ritterkreuz des Eisernen Kreuzes mit Eichenlaub) on 17 March 1942. The presentation was made by Hitler at the Wolf's Lair, Hitler's headquarters in Rastenburg, present-day Kętrzyn in Poland. Also presented with awards that day by Hitler were Hauptmann Herbert Ihlefeld, who received the Swords to his Knight's Cross with Oak Leaves, and Oberleutnant Wolfgang Späte who was also honored with the Oak Leaves. On 1 April, Huy was promoted to Hauptmann (captain).

Following his recovery from the wounds sustained in March, Huy returned to JG 77 on 2 August 1942, again taking command of 7. Staffel.

=== North Africa and prisoner of war ===
On 23 October 1942, the British Eighth Army launched the Second Battle of El Alamein. Preceding this attack, the Luftwaffe had already planned to replace Jagdgeschwader 27 (JG 27—27th Fighter Wing), which had been fighting in North African theater, with JG 77. In preparation for this rotation, III. Gruppe of JG 77 was moved to Munich on 19 October where it was equipped with the Bf 109 G-2/trop. On 23 and 24 October, the Gruppe moved to Bari in southern Italy. The Gruppe then relocated to Tobruk Airfield on 26 October. The following day, the Gruppe moved to an airfield at Tanyet-Harun.

On 28 October, Huy claimed a Spitfire shot down near El Alamein. On 29 October, Huy was shot down in his Bf 109 G-2 (Werknummer 13633) and baled out. His victor was P/O JH Nicholls (an eventual 7-kill ace) flying a Spitfire Vc of No. 601 Squadron. Huy survived the encounter and spent the rest of World War II as a prisoner of war. He was held in a POW camp near the Great Bitter Lake and released in March 1947.

== Later life ==
In 1998, Huy was involved in a car accident, impacting his health. Huy died on 13 July 2003 at the age of 85 in Gernsbach, Germany.

== Summary of career ==
=== Aerial victory claims ===
According to Obermaier, Huy was credited with 40 aerial victories, including 37 on the Eastern Front, claimed in over 500 combat missions. Mathews and Foreman, authors of Luftwaffe Aces — Biographies and Victory Claims, researched the German Federal Archives and found documentation for 35 aerial victory claims, plus three further unconfirmed claims. This number of confirmed claims includes 34 on the Eastern Front and one on the Western Front.

Victory claims were logged to a map-reference (PQ = Planquadrat), for example "PQ 3629". The Luftwaffe grid map (Jägermeldenetz) covered all of Europe, western Russia and North Africa and was composed of rectangles measuring 15 minutes of latitude by 30 minutes of longitude, an area of about 360 square miles (930 km^{2}). These sectors were then subdivided into 36 smaller units to give a location area 3 km × 4 km (1.9 mi × 2.5 mi) in size.

Chronicle of aerial victories
This and the – (dash) indicates unconfirmed aerial victory claims for which Huy did not receive credit. This and the ? (question mark) indicates information discrepancies listed by Prien, Stemmer, Rodeike, Bock, Mathews and Foreman.
Claim	Date	Time	Type	Location	Claim	Date	Time	Type	Location
– Stab II. Gruppe of Trägergruppe 186 – Battle of France — 11 May – 1 June 1940
1	31 May 1940	—	Spitfire	Dunkirk					
– 7. Staffel of Jagdgeschwader 77 – Operation Barbarossa — 22 June – 5 December 1941
2	24 June 1941	06:05	ZKB-19 (DB-3)		15? (Note: This claim is not listed by Mathews and Foreman.)	23 August 1941	—	SB-2	
3	24 June 1941	18:26	SB-2		16	2 October 1941	11:50	I-61 (MiG-3)	
4	24 June 1941	18:29	SB-2		17	5 October 1941	11:45	I-61 (MiG-3)	
5	26 June 1941	04:38	ZKB-19 (DB-3)		18	9 October 1941	11:40	I-61 (MiG-3)	PQ 3629
6	26 June 1941	04:43	I-16		19	16 October 1941	12:40	I-153	
7	2 July 1941	05:20	ZKB-19 (DB-3)		20	16 October 1941	12:45	I-153	
8	2 July 1941	05:23	ZKB-19 (DB-3)		— ? (Note: This unconfirmed claim is not listed by Prien, Stemmer, Rodeike and Bock.)	16 October 1941	—	DB-3	
9	23 July 1941	09:30	MiG-3		21	17 October 1941	16:10	I-61 (MiG-3)	
10	25 July 1941	19:40	I-153		22	18 October 1941	07:00	I-61 (MiG-3)	
11	26 July 1941	09:50	DB-3		23	22 October 1941	11:25	I-16	
12	31 July 1941	11:34	I-61 (MiG-3)		24	23 October 1941	16:20	I-15	
13	31 July 1941	11:34? (Note: According to Mathews and Foreman claimed at 11:35.)	I-61 (MiG-3)		25	27 October 1941	12:36	I-15	
14?	23 August 1941	—	SB-2						
– 7. Staffel of Jagdgeschwader 77 – Eastern Front — 6 December 1941 – 11 March 1942
26	26 December 1941	10:59	DB-3		33	15 January 1942	13:25	I-301 (LaGG-3)	
27	26 December 1941	11:01	DB-3		34? (Note: According to Mathews and Foreman this claim was unconfirmed.)	15 January 1942	—	R-5	
28	26 December 1941	11:20	DB-3		35	1 March 1942	15:22	I-153	PQ 5673
29	31 December 1941	10:00	DB-3		36	5 March 1942	09:35	MiG-3	PQ 5667
30	31 December 1941	11:28	DB-3		37	5 March 1942	17:15	I-16	PQ 5673
31	6 January 1942	12:05	DB-3		38?	11 March 1942	14:45	I-16	
32	15 January 1942	13:20	I-301 (LaGG-3)						
– 7. Staffel of Jagdgeschwader 77 – Eastern Front — 2 August – 16 October 1942
39	16 September 1942	07:44	Yak-1	PQ 00282					
– 7. Staffel of Jagdgeschwader 77 – North Africa — 26–29 October 1942
40?	28 October 1942	—	Spitfire	El Alamein					

=== Awards ===
- Iron Cross (1939)
  - 2nd Class (1 December 1939)
  - 2nd Class (1 May 1941)
- Honour Goblet of the Luftwaffe on 25 January 1942 as Oberleutnant and pilot (Note: According to Thomas on 21 January 1941, and according to Obermaier on 23 January 1942.)
- Knight's Cross of the Iron Cross with Oak Leaves
  - Knight's Cross on 5 July 1941 as Oberleutnant and Staffelkapitän of the 7./Jagdgeschwader 77
  - 83rd Oak Leaves on 17 March 1942 as Oberleutnant and Staffelkapitän of the 7./Jagdgeschwader 77
