= Friedrich-Wilhelm Strakeljahn =

German flying ace (1914–1944)

- Born: 7 September 1914; Lübeck
- Died: 6 July 1944 (aged 29); Daugavpils
- Cause of death: Killed in action
- Military career
- Allegiance: Nazi Germany
- Branch: Luftwaffe
- Service years: 1935–1944
- Rank: Hauptmann (captain)
- Units: LG 2, JG 77, JG 5, SG 4
- Commands: II./SG 4
- Conflicts: World War II: Invasion of Poland; Battle of France; Battle of Britain; Eastern Front
- Awards: Knight's Cross of the Iron Cross

Friedrich-Wilhelm Strakeljahn (7 September 1914 – 6 July 1944) was a German Luftwaffe military aviator during World War II, a fighter ace listed with at least nine enemy aircraft shot down in over 300 combat missions. As a commander of fighter bombers, his unit was credited with the destruction of 39,000 gross register tons (GRT) of Allied shipping. On 6 July 1944, Strakeljahn was killed in action, shot down by Soviet anti-aircraft artillery near Daugavpils.

== Career ==
Strakeljahn was born on 7 September 1914 at Lübeck, an independent free city with the German Empire. He became a police officer and in 1935 joined the Luftwaffe. Following flight training, (Note: Flight training in the Luftwaffe progressed through the levels A1, A2 and B1, B2, referred to as A/B flight training. A training included theoretical and practical training in aerobatics, navigation, long-distance flights and dead-stick landings. The B courses included high-altitude flights, instrument flights, night landings and training to handle the aircraft in difficult situations.) he was posted to I. (Jäger) Gruppe (I.(J)—1st fighter group) of Lehrgeschwader 2 (LG 2—2nd Demonstration Wing), an operational training unit tasked with the evaluation of new types of aircraft and tactics. Strakeljahn had graduated from the Luftkriegsschule 1 (1st Air War School) in Dresden in the summer of 1938 and was initially assigned to 1. Staffel of LG 2 commanded by Hauptmann Harro Harder, a veteran of the Spanish Civil War.

== World War II ==
World War II in Europe began on Friday, 1 September 1939, when German forces invaded Poland. In preparation for the invasion, I.(J)/LG 2 had deployed to an airfield at Malzkow, present-day Malczkowo. At the time, Strakeljahn served as Gruppenadjutant, the assisting officer, helping the commanding officer of I.(J)/LG 2, Hauptmann Hanns Trübenbach, with unit administration. The Gruppe supported the 4th Army as part of Army Group North.

On 19 May 1940 during the Battle of France, Strakeljahn claimed his first two aerial victories. He claimed a Royal Air Force (RAF) Westland Lysander shot down near Lille and a Hawker Hurricane fighter near Le Cateau before he was shot down in his Messerschmitt Bf 109 E-3 by Armée de l'air (French Air Force) Morane-Saulnier M.S.406 fighter aircraft near Compiègne. Initially posted as missing in action, Strakeljahn was wounded in the encounter and returned to his unit on 22 May.

Strakeljahn was appointed Staffelkapitän (squadron leader) of 2.(J)/LG 2 on 30 August 1940, replacing Oberleutnant Herbert Ihlefeld who was transferred to take command of I.(J)/LG 2. On 6 January 1942, I.(J)/LG 2 was redesignated and became the I. Gruppe of Jagdgeschwader 77 (JG 77—77th Fighter Wing). Consequently, 2.(J)/LG 2 became the 2. Staffel of JG 77.

=== War on the Arctic Front ===
On 17 May 1942, Strakeljahn was transferred to Jagdgeschwader 5 (JG 5—5th Fighter Wing). Command of 2. Staffel of JG 77 was given to Oberleutnant Herbert Thurz. Prior to his departure from JG 77, Strakeljahn briefly led 7. Staffel on behalf of Oberleutnant Wolf-Dietrich Huy who had been wounded in combat. With JG 5, he was appointed the first Staffelkapitän of 12. Staffel on 1 July 1942. The Staffel was initially based at Trondheim-Ørland Airfield and was subordinated to the newly formed IV. Gruppe of JG 5. In early September, Strakeljahn relocated 12. Staffel to Bodø where they relieved 11. Staffel. On 21 September, Strakeljahn was awarded the German Cross in Gold (Deutsches Kreuz in Gold).

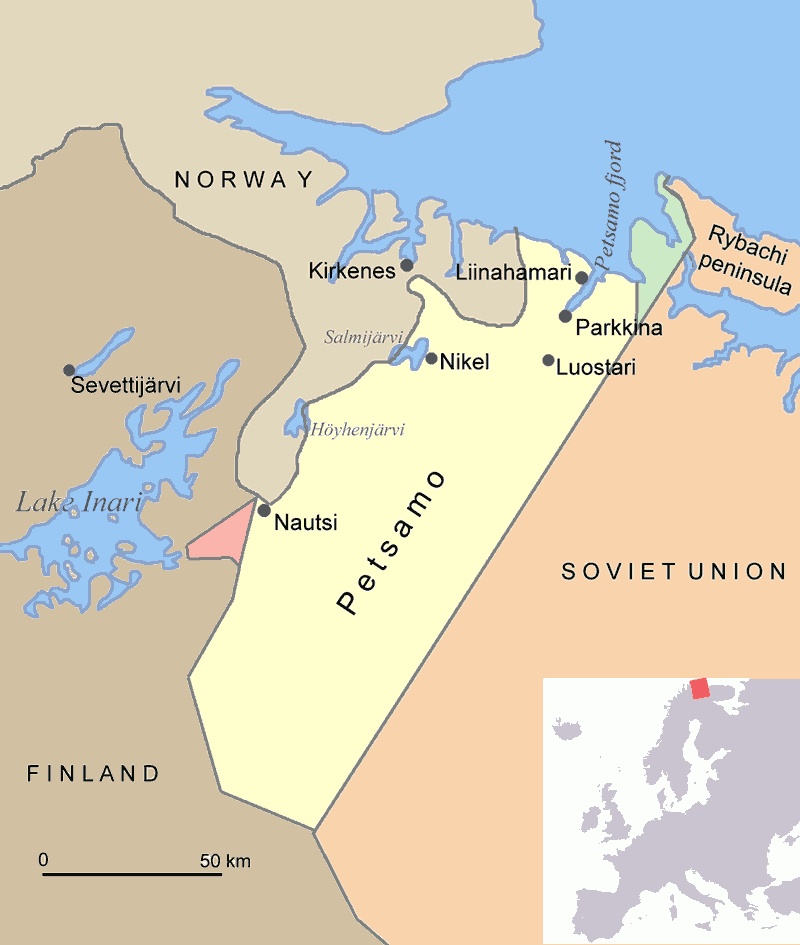
Area of operations.

On 4 March 1943, Strakeljahn succeeded Hauptmann Erich Schreiber as Staffelkapitän of 14.(Jabo)/JG 5, a fighter bomber squadron. The Staffel was based at Petsamo, present-day Pechenga in Murmansk Oblast, Russia on the Eismeerfront (Ice Sea Front)—the area of operations nearest the Arctic Ocean. Equipped with the Focke-Wulf Fw 190 A-2 and A-3 armed with SC 250 and SC 500 bombs, the unit primarily intercepted Soviet coastal shipping. On 4 April, 14.(Jabo)/JG 5 attacked Allied shipping from convoy JW 53 off Rosta in the Kola Bay, claiming a near miss on the British cargo steamship SS Dover Hill. On 8 May, Strakeljahn led seven Fw 190s in an attack on Soviet shipping in the Kola Bay. Five Fw 190s attacked the Soviet destroyer Grozny, scoring near misses and inflicting some damage. The other two Fw 190s spotted a Soviet submarine near the exit of the Kola Bay. The pilots later filed an unconfirmed claim for its sinking. On 14 May, Strakeljahn led 14.(Jabo)/JG 5 in the attack on the Soviet submarine M-122 off the northern coast of the Rybachy Peninsula. A direct hit on the conning tower by Feldwebel Stefan Türk sank M-122.

On 7 July, Strakeljahn led a flight of three Fw 190 fighter bombers on a mission over the Motka Bay. Near the southern exit of the bay they spotted and attacked a vessel of approximately 100 gross register tons (GRT) with SC 500 bombs which they Luftwaffe pilots claimed sunk. Strakeljahn had released his bomb too close to the vessel, in consequence, the explosion of the bomb damaged his Fw 190 A-3 (Werknummer—135508 factory number). Nevertheless, Strakeljahn managed to fly back to Petsamo. Following the landing, Strakeljahn sustained severe injuries when an explosion set his aircraft on fire. His injuries were so severe that he temporarily had to be replaced by Oberleutnant Karl-Friedrich Koch as commander of 14.(Jabo)/JG 5. Following his convalescence and return to his unit, Strakeljahn received the Knight's Cross of the Iron Cross (Ritterkreuz des Eisernen Kreuzes) on 19 August 1943 for his leadership, at the time he was credited with nine aerial victories and personally sank 15,000 GRT of shipping. The presentation was made by Generalmajor Ernst-August Roth, at the time Fliegerführer Lofoten and Fliegerführer Nord (Ost).

=== Group commander and death ===
On 15 April 1944, 14.(Jabo)/JG 5 relocated from the Eastern Front to the Mediterranean theater where it was redesignated and became the 4. Staffel of Schlachtgeschwader 4 (SG 4—4th Combat Wing) and based at Viterbo Airfield, Italy. Strakeljahn then became Gruppenkommandeur (group commander) of II. Gruppe of SG 4 on 20 May, succeeding Hauptmann Gerhard Walther who was killed in action two days earlier. In June, the Gruppe relocated to the northern sector of the Eastern Front. On 6 July, Strakeljahn was killed in action when his Fw 190 F-8 (Werknummer—931018) was hit by anti-aircraft fire west of Macuty, near Dünaburg, present-day Daugavpils.

== Summary of career ==
=== Aerial victory claims ===
According to Obermaier, Strakeljahn was credited with nine aerial victories claimed in over 300 combat missions. As a leader of fighter bombers, his Staffel sank 39,000 GRT of shipping. Mathews and Foreman, authors of Luftwaffe Aces — Biographies and Victory Claims, researched the German Federal Archives and state that he was credited with ten aerial victory claims. This number includes five claims on the Western Front with others claimed on the Eastern Front.

Chronicle of aerial victories
! (exclamation mark) indicates those aerial victories listed by Prien, Stemmer, Rodeike, Bock, Mathews and Foreman. # (hash mark) indicates those aerial victories listed by Prien in his 1995 book. ? Information discrepancies listed by Prien, Stemmer, Rodeike, Bock, Mathews and Foreman.
Claim!	Claim#	Date	Time	Type	Location	Claim!	Claim#	Date	Time	Type	Location
– Stab I.(Jagd) Gruppe of Lehrgeschwader 2 – Battle of France — 10 May – 25 June 1940
1		19 May 1940	14:20	Lysander	Lille		1	29 May 1940	—	Hurricane	
2		19 May 1940	14:23	Hurricane	Le Cateau						
– Stab I.(Jagd) Gruppe of Lehrgeschwader 2 – At the Channel and over England — 26 June – 30 August 1940
	2	22 August 1940	—	Spitfire		4	3	30 August 1940	19:02	Spitfire	
3		24 August 1940	16:30	Spitfire			4	7 September 1940	—	Hurricane	
– 2.(Jagd) Staffel of Lehrgeschwader 2 – At the Channel and over England — 31 August 1940 – 30 March 1941
5		20 October 1940	10:30	Spitfire			5	14 February 1941	—	Spitfire	
– 2.(Jagd) Staffel of Lehrgeschwader 2 – Operation Barbarossa — 22 June – 5 December 1941
6		10 July 1941	13:08? (Note: According to Mathews and Foreman claimed at 13:08.)	I-15		7	6	17 July 1941	06:07	I-16? (Note: According to the 1995 book by Prien listed as a Mikoyan-Gurevich MiG-1.)	
– 2. Staffel of Jagdgeschwader 77 – Eastern Front — 6 January – 30 April 1942
	7	21 January 1942	—	I-16			9	21 March 1942	—	DB-3	
	8	18 February 1942	—	DB-3		8		15 April 1942? (Note: According to Mathews and Foreman claimed on 15 March 1942.)	16:36	Pe-2	
– 7. Staffel of Jagdgeschwader 77 – Eastern Front — 16 May – 1 July 1942
9		1 July 1942	17:17	Yak-1							

=== Awards ===
- Iron Cross (1939) 2nd and 1st Class
- German Cross in Gold on 21 September 1942 as Oberleutnant in the I./Jagdgeschwader 77
- Knight's Cross of the Iron Cross on 19 August 1943 as Hauptmann and Staffelkapitän of 14.(Jabo)/Jagdgeschwader 5
