= Air War School Klotzsche =

Building in Dresden, Saxony, Germany

Coordinates: 51.1315°N 13.7837°E

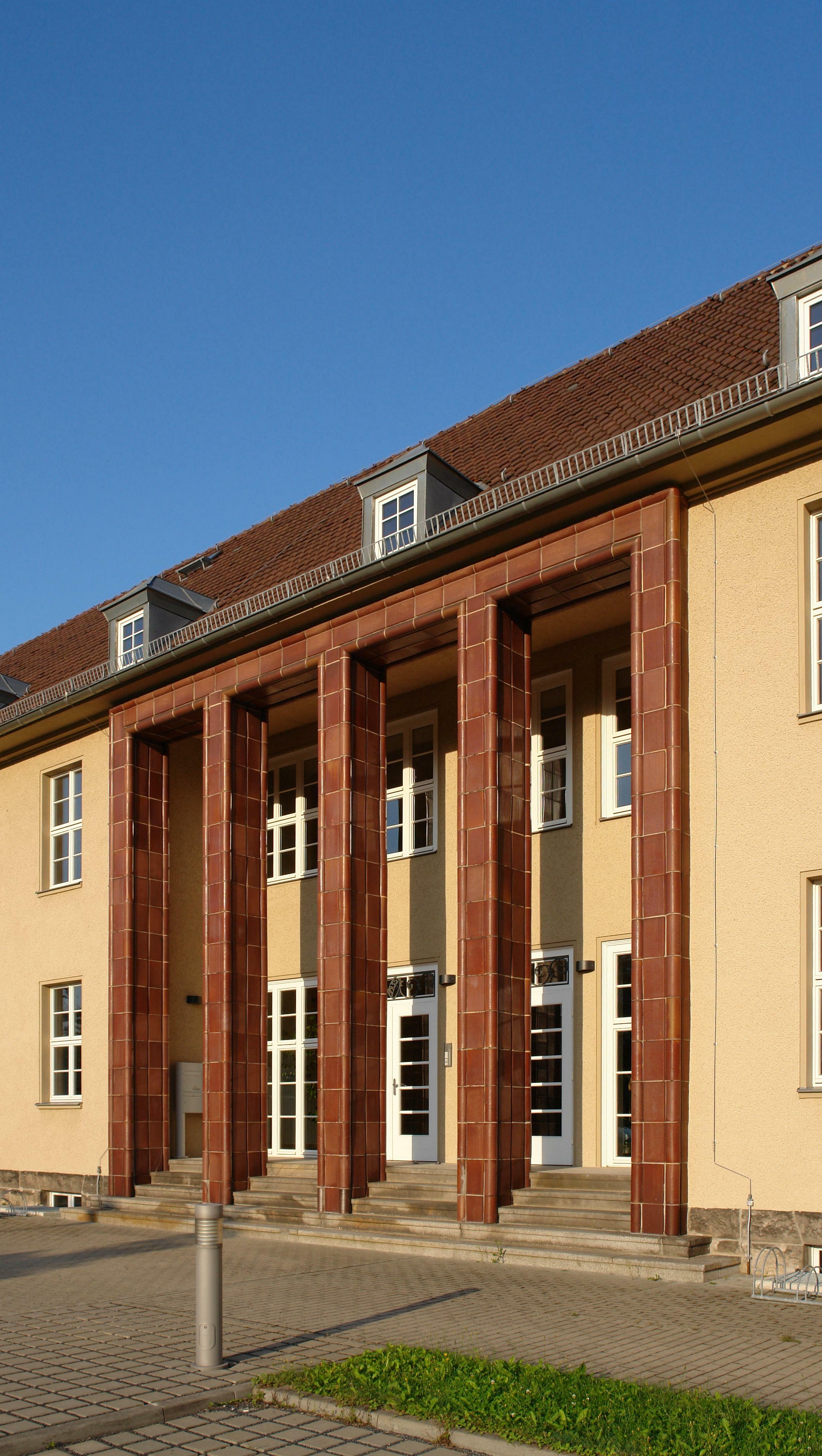
Luftkriegsschule Dresden Junkers-Ring 5

The Air War School Klotzsche (German: Luftkriegsschule Klotzsche) also known as Luftkriegsschule 1 (LKS 1) is a former Luftwaffe school in the Dresden borough of Klotzsche. The Air War School Klotzsche was built in 1935, designed by Ernst Sagebiel and architect Walter and John Krüger. The school was used during the Third Reich. Pilot training ended in October 1944, and the school was disbanded on 5 March 1945.

== Commanding officers ==
- Generalmajor Oskar Kriegbaum, 1 April 1936 – 30 April 1942
- Generalmajor Josef Brunner, 1 May 1942 – 9 June 1944
- Oberst Lutz, June 1944 – August 1944
- Oberst Erich Kaufmann, 16 August 1944 – 16 April 1945

== Notable graduates ==
- Hans-Karl Stepp (1914–2006), pilot
- Hans-Joachim Pancherz (1914–2008), test pilot.
- Friedrich-Wilhelm Strakeljahn (1914–1944), fighter ace
- Gustav Rödel (1915–1995) fighter ace
- Ludwig Meister (1919–2011), fighter ace
- Gerhard Barkhorn (1919–1983), fighter ace
- Joachim Müncheberg (1918–1943), fighter ace
- Joachim Kirschner (1920–1943), fighter ace
