= Saint-Maximin, Gard =

Saint-Maximin
- Commune
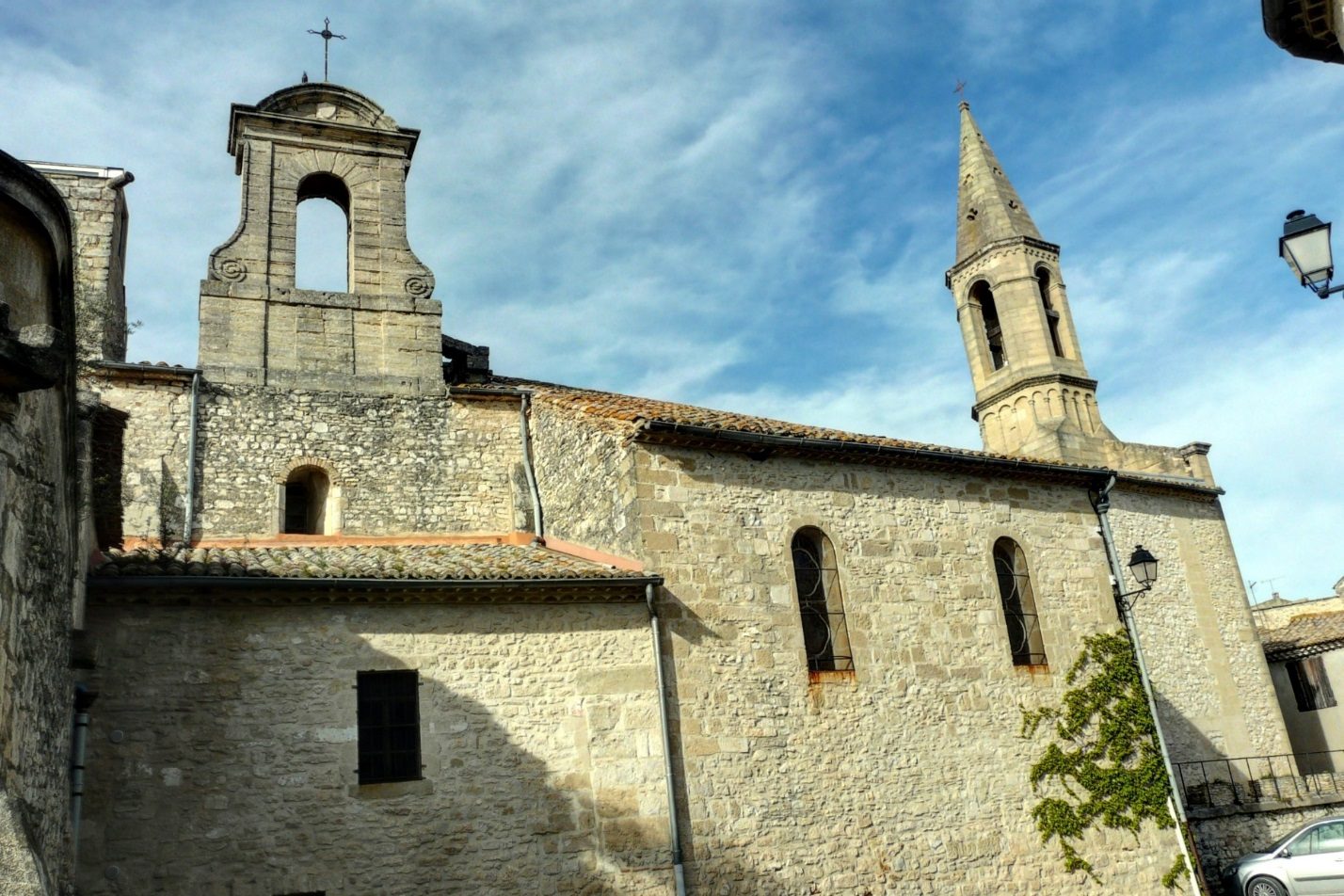
- Église Saint-Maximin de Saint-Maximin

- Coat of arms
- Location of Saint-Maximin
- Location within France Location within Occitanie
- Coordinates: 43°59′42″N 4°27′05″E
- Country: France
- Region: Occitania
- Department: Gard
- Arrondissement: Nîmes
- Canton: Uzès

Government
  - Mayor (2020–2026): Henri Pierre Arqué
- Area^{1}: 9.9 km^{2} (3.8 sq mi)
- Elevation: 61 m (200 ft)
- Highest elevation: 202 m (663 ft)
- Lowest elevation: 40 m (130 ft)
- Population (2023): 798
  - Density: 81/km^{2} (210/sq mi)
- Time zone: UTC+01:00 (CET)
  - Summer (DST): UTC+02:00 (CEST)
- INSEE/Postal code: 30286 /30700
- ^{1} French Land Register data, which excludes lakes, ponds, glaciers > 1 km^{2} (0.386 sq mi or 247 acres) and river estuaries.

Saint-Maximin (French pronunciation: [sɛ̃ maksimɛ̃]; Occitan: Sent Maissemin) is a commune in the Gard department in southern France.

== Population ==
Historical population
Year	Pop.	±% p.a.
1968	255	—
1975	278	+1.24%
1982	393	+5.07%
1990	628	+6.03%
1999	630	+0.04%
2007	626	−0.08%
2012	695	+2.11%
2017	746	+1.43%
2023	798	+1.13%
Source: INSEE

== Personalities ==
The poet and dramatist Jean Racine stayed in Saint-Maximin in 1661 and 1662. He went there with his maternal uncle, Antoine Sconin, vicar general of Uzès.

== Notable people ==
- Gabriel Fabricy (1725-1800) - Biblical scholar and Dominican Friar

== See also ==
- Communes of the Gard department
