= History of the Jews in Baghdad =

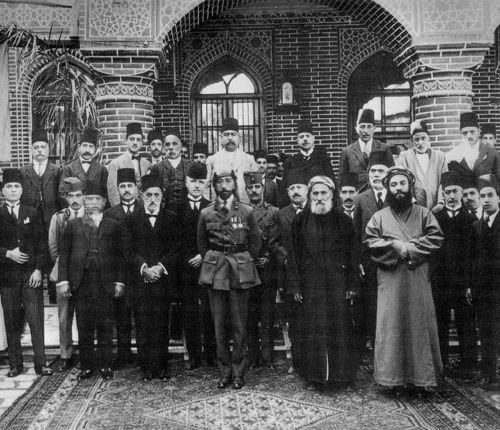
King Faisal on a visit to the Baghdad Jewish community with chief Rabbi Ezra Dangoor and community notables, 1925

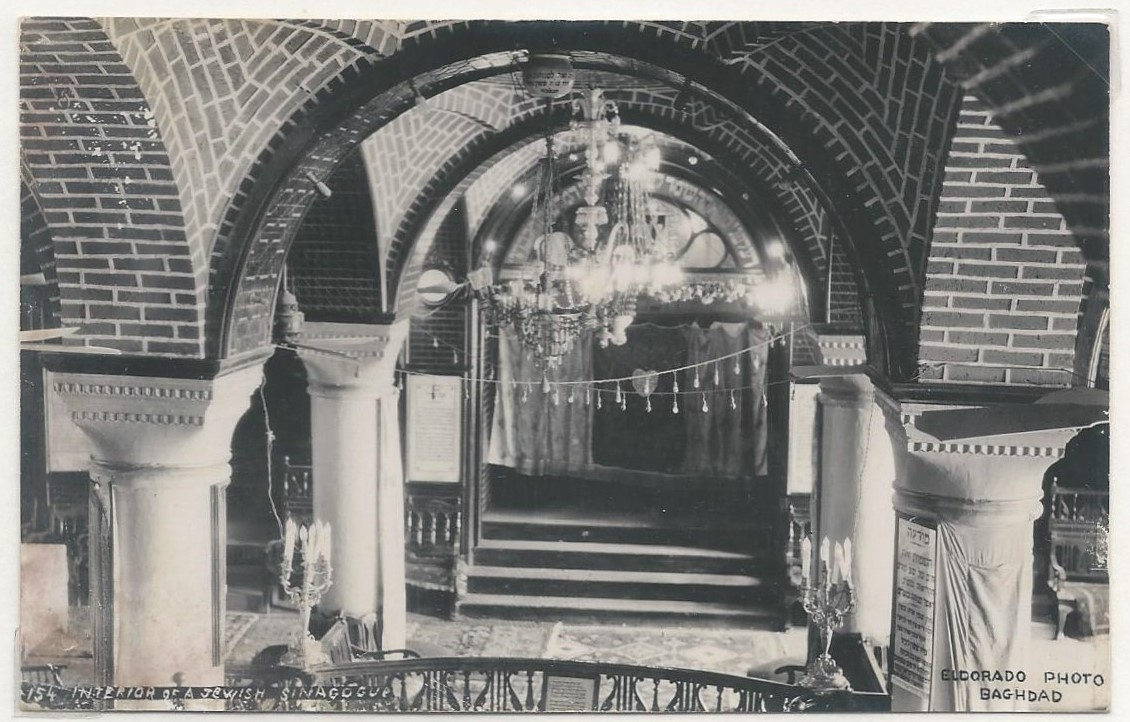
Great Synagogue of Baghdad

Jewish life in Baghdad dates back to the city’s early centuries under the Abbasid Caliphs, when its proximity to older centers of learning like Sura and Pumbedita helped draw scholars and families alike. At different moments, Jews found opportunity in the city—as merchants, religious leaders, and craftsmen—but their position was never entirely secure. Periods of relative stability were often interrupted by new restrictions or outbreaks of violence, especially during times of political upheaval. By the nineteenth century, however, Baghdad’s Jewish community had grown into one of the most prominent in the region, deeply embedded in the city’s commercial and cultural life, even as the dramatic changes of the twentieth century would ultimately lead to its decline.

After the Mongol conquest of 1258, the Jewish community suffered massacres and forced conversions, particularly in 1333 and 1344, though it recovered under subsequent rulers. By the 19th century, Baghdad's Jewish merchants dominated trade with India, and leading families such as the Sassoons emigrated to Bombay and Calcutta after persecution by the Ottoman governor Dawud Pasha.

During the first half of the 20th century, the substantial Jewish community (probably exceeding 100,000 people) comprised between a quarter and a third of the city's population. Political changes in Iraq, culminating in the fall of the Ba'athist regime, led to the decline of the Jewish population in Baghdad as emigration increased.

== Under the Abbasid Caliphs ==
According to Arab tradition, the town of Baghdad was founded in the middle of the eighth century by the Abbasid caliph Al-Mansur. According to the Jewish Encyclopedia, the fact that a Babylonian city named Bagdad is already mentioned in the Talmud (Ketubot 7b, Zebahim 9a) suggests that the Caliph Mansur only rebuilt and enlarged the older Persian City of Baghdad. That Baghdad was originally a Persian city is indicated by the name, which is thought to be of Persian origin. Situated on the left bank of the Tigris, the town was in close proximity to the two centers of Jewish spiritual life, Sura and Pumbedita. As the Caliph was anxious to see the population of his new residence increase, he offered no resistance to Jews settling there and forming a community. They became so numerous that one of the bridges over the Karkhâyâ in the western suburb was called Qanṭara al-Yahūd "Jews' Bridge" (Guy Le Strange, "Baghdad during the Abbasid Caliphate," p. 150), and Yaqut al-Hamawi mentions that the Jewish quarter, the Dar al-Yahūd, was in the neighborhood (iv. 1045).

The Jews were occasionally troubled by revivals of the restrictions on non-Moslems. These regulations were first renewed by Harun al-Rashid (786–809), who ordered that Jews and Christians should wear distinguishing marks on their clothing, refrain from riding on horseback, and suffer other similar humiliations. These restrictions were later relaxed, but were again imposed by Al-Mutawakkil (880), who went so far as to convert the synagogues into mosques. Jews did, however, hold state offices under Al-Mutadid (892–902).

As the seat of the caliphate, Baghdad quickly gained prominence. It was a home for Jewish learning; and a number of prominent individuals lived there. Aaron ben Samuel ha-Nasi of Babylon, the mystic of the ninth century, came to Italy from this city (Graetz, "History of the Jews," Hebrew transl., v., Appendix, p 46). Its importance at the time of the Geonim must not be underrated, as it is often mentioned at this time under the name of "Babylon" (בבל). (On the name עדינה, see Steinschneider, "Polemische und Apologetische Literatur in Arabischer Sprache zwischen Muslimen, Christen und Juden" p. 293; idem, "Hebräische Bibliographie" xiii. 90; "Jewish Quarterly Review," xii. 115). Baghdad belonged rather to Pumbedita Academy than to Sura Academy, but the heads of the Jewish community in both places came to the Caliph's city in order to swear allegiance to the resh galuta or exilarch.).

According to the Jewish Encyclopedia, the Jews of Baghdad were affected by the Karaite schism. Ishmael of Ukbara (c. 840) came from a place seven miles from the city; and Sahl ben Matzliah (eleventh century) preached publicly in the streets against Rabbinical Judaism. He was answered in the same way by Jacob ben Samuel, Abu Imran al-Za'farani the founder of a new sect, was born in Baghdad in the ninth century.).

At the time of the Caliph al-Mutadid, the Jews of Baghdad fared well on account of the kind treatment accorded to them by the vizier 'Ubaid Allah ibn Sulaiman. The heads of the community were Joseph ben Phineas and his son-in-law, Natira (Graetz, ib. iii. 274). The gaon Aaron ibn Sargado (943–960) came from Baghdad, and it was here that his relative, Kasher ibn Abraham, was called upon to settle a dispute in which he had become involved (Graetz, ib. iii. 306, 308). About the year 950, the grammarian Dunash ben Labrat was in Baghdad; and in this city the gaons Hai, Kimui bar Rab Aḥai, and Yehudai bar Samuel were officials (דייני דבבא בבגדד) before going to Pumbedita. According to Hai (died 1038), the Baghdad Jews of his day were accustomed to say the 'Abodah of the Day of Atonement both at the morning and musaf service (Graetz, ib. iii. 166). It is also probable that the exegete and traveler Abraham ibn Ezra visited Baghdad between the years 1138 and 1140 (see his commentary to Exodus 25:18). Ibn Ezra's son Isaac, who probably came with him, and was baptized, wrote in Baghdad (1143) a poem in honor of another convert, Nathaniel Hibat Allah ("Kokbe Yiẓḥaḳ," 1858, p. 23; Graetz, "History of the Jews," Hebr. transl., iv., Appendix, p. 47).

== In the twelfth century ==
During the twelfth century, the Jews of Baghdad attained again some measure of self-government. The calif Al-Muktafi appointed a wealthy man, Samuel ben Ḥisdai, exilarch in Baghdad. He gathered the taxes, paying a certain portion over into the state treasury; and all important appointments had to receive his sanction. Both Benjamin of Tudela and Pethahiah of Regensburg visited Baghdad, and have left interesting information regarding the Jews there. According to Benjamin, there were at his time in the city 23 synagogues, 1,000 Jewish families, and 10 yeshibot (rabbinical schools). According to Pethahiah, however, "At Baghdad there are three synagogues, besides that built by Daniel on the spot on which the angel stood on the brink of the river, . . . as is written in the Book of Daniel." Pethahiah adds: "The head of the academy has many servants. They flog any one not immediately executing his orders; therefore people fear him. . . . He is clothed in gold and colored garments like the king; his palace also is hung with costly tapestries like that of the king."

The most prominent heads of the yeshibot were at that time Ali and his son, Samuel. David Alroy studied under Ali at the time Ḥisdai was exilarch (Wiener, "Emek haBacha," pp. 27, 167; "Shebeṭ Yehudah," ed. Wiener, p. 50; Sambari, in Neubauer, "Medieval Jewish Chronicles," i. 123; Graetz, "History of the Jews," Hebrew transl., iv. 308). The reputation of Samuel seems to have spread far and wide; for we learn that Rabbi Moses of Kiev came from Russia especially to receive information from him (Epstein, in "Monatsschrift für die Geschichte und Wissenschaft des Judenthums," xxxix. 511, 512; Graetz, ib. iv. 44). It was this same Samuel who, in later years, was a determined opponent of Maimonides, and who made Baghdad for the time a very hotbed of anti-Maimonist intrigue (Graetz, ib. Appendix, p. 34). Maimonides' pupil, Ibn Aknin, had formed a plan of opening a school at Baghdad for the purpose of propagating his master's teachings. Maimonides, however, advised him against such an action, as he wished to spare him the opposition which he knew Ibn Aknin would encounter (Grätz, "Geschichte der Juden," vi. 362). Daniel, the son of Ḥisdai, followed his father in office: but he left no son; and though two of his cousins in Mosul pretended to hold office, the short-lived recrudescence of the resh galuta was at an end (Grätz, "Geschichte der Juden," vi. 460; Hebrew transl., iv. 459, Appendix, p. 59). The anonymous author of the Hebrew-Arabic Diwan published in "He-Ḥaluẓ," iii. 150 (MS. Bodleian 2424 and MS. in collection of E. N. Adler), who lived before the middle of the thirteenth century, traveled as far as Baghdad, where he met the head of the yeshiva ("Jewish Quarterly Review," xii. 115, 202).

== In the thirteenth century ==
The Jews of Baghdad diminished largely in numbers and influence, not only because of the general movement of the Jews toward Europe and because of the Crusades, but also through the storming of the town by the Mongols. Arghun (1284–91), however, had a Jewish physician in Baghdad, Sa'ad al-Daulah, who was consulted in all financial matters by the sultan; but upon the death of Arghun, the position which the Jews had gained through Sa'ad al-Daulah was quickly lost, and the streets of the city flowed with Jewish blood (see "Revue Etudes Juives," xxxvi. 254).

== In the fourteenth century ==
Forced conversions took place in Baghdad in 1333 and 1344.

== In the fifteenth century ==
With the fall of the Abbasid power the eastern caliphate went to ruin. Very little is known concerning the Jews of Baghdad during the following period, and we can only find a few notes here and there in the works of travelers who have passed through the place. In 1400 the city was besieged by Tamerlane, and many Jews who had taken refuge here from other villages perished (Jost, "Israelitische Annalen," 1839, p. 197).

== In the seventeenth and eighteenth centuries ==
Pedro Teixeira, at the beginning of the seventeenth century, found in Baghdad 20,000 to 30,000 houses, of which 200 to 300 were inhabited by Jews. He says that they lived in a certain part of the town in which their "kanis" (synagogue) was situated. It was in the early Seventeenth Century, that the axis of Mesopotamian Jewry began to shift back towards Baghdad.

== In the nineteenth century ==
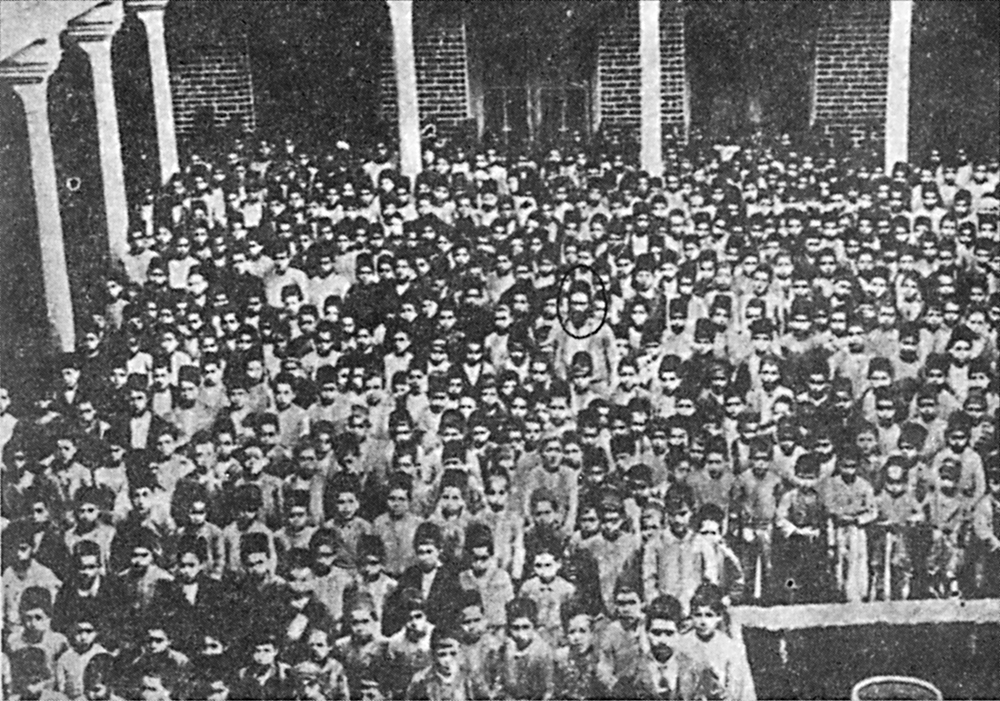
Jewish students at the Midrash Talmud Torah (1832–1951) in Baghdad, Iraq (date unknown)

At the beginning of the nineteenth century, Ezekiel Bagdadli was the richest banker in the city. He became involved in politics and went to Constantinople, where he exercised great influence as a court banker ("saraf bashi"). Armenian intrigues, however, occasioned his fall, and he was put to death between the years 1820 and 1826 at Adalia in Asia Minor (Franco, "L'Histoire des Israélites de l'Empire Ottoman," p. 132).

Jews were massacred in Baghdad in 1828.

The traveler J. J. Benjamin was in Baghdad in 1847, and tells us that the Jews at that time numbered 3,000 families and were living in happy circumstances. They were under a "Hakham Bashi" appointed by the Sublime Porte. Their dayyanim or rabbinical chiefs were Jacob ben Joseph, Elijah Obadiah, and Rabbi Abdola (Abdallah). Every male Hebrew of the community paid a tax which varied between 15 and 120 piasters per year. Raphael Kassin was Hakham Bashi, and next to him in rank was the Nasi, Joseph Moses Reuben. The yeshiva had then sixty pupils, who were in the charge of Abdullah ben Abraham Seumech.

Though the Jews inhabited a certain quarter of the city, to live in that quarter was not compulsory upon them. Of the nine synagogues which J. J. Benjamin mentions, eight were situated in one court; while the ninth was a large building, resting on sixteen columns, called "Bet ha-Keneset Sheik Isaac Gaon," in a side room of which building the body of that saint was interred. Baghdad was a cultural center of Jewish learning with, in the early nineteenth century, the largest library of the city being in the hands of the astronomer, poet and communal leader Solomon Ma'tuk.

The trade of Baghdad with India was then largely in the hands of the Jews, who had manufactories in Calcutta, Bombay, Singapore, and Canton. This is corroborated by the evidence of the Rev. Henry A. Stern ("Dawnings of Light in the East," p. 46, London, 1854), who says:

"Jews ... are the governing element of the place. They have their stored booths in every bazaar, occupy all the principal caravansaries ..., and entirely control the business of bankerage and monopolies."

In the mid-nineteenth century, the reign of Dawud Pasha of Baghdad saw the leading Jewish families of the city persecuted by the Ottoman governor. This led to many of the leading families, such as the Sassoon family as the Judah family, descended from Solomon Ma'tuk, to leave the city for the booming port cities of British India. This was the origin of the trading network and diaspora of Middle Eastern Jews in Asia known as the Baghdadi Jews. David Sassoon would come to be seen as the leader of the Baghdadi Jewish trading diaspora and his friend and relative Ezekiel Judah in Calcutta would establish synagogues.

Stern estimated the Jewish population in his day at 16,000, as against 1,500 Christians and 40,000 Moslems. The Jews were at that time divided into Persian and Arabian. On March 27, 1845, a "herem" (ban) was launched against all who had any connection with the missionaries (compare "Narrative of a Mission of Inquiry to the Jews from the Church of Scotland," 1848, ii. 373). In 1860, H. Petermann of Berlin found 1,300 Jewish families in Baghdad, of whom 2,300 persons paid the poll-tax. The oldest Jewish families, he says, came there from Ana on the Euphrates. According to Vital Cuinet ("La Turquie d'Asie," iii. 66, 97, 104), in the year 1890, there were 53,800 Jews in the vilayet of Baghdad, of whom 52,500 lived in Baghdad, 500 in Hilla, and 800 in Kerbela. He gives the number of primary schools as 52, of synagogues as 22, and of cemeteries 2. The women and young children were at that time engaged in manufacturing what is called the "agabani," a garment made of European stuffs embroidered with India silk. The trade in Babylonian and Assyrian antiquities is largely in the hands of the Jews of Baghdad (Delitzsch, "Babylon," 2d edition, 1901, p. 5).

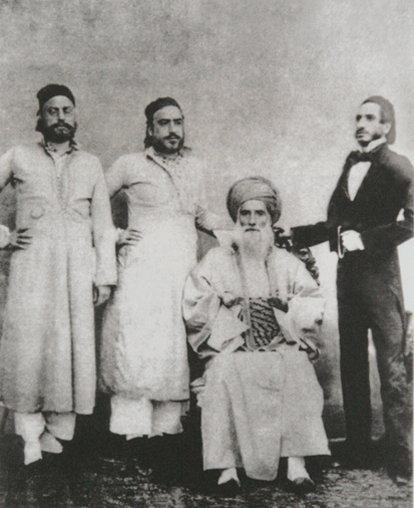
David Sassoon of Baghdad (seated) and his sons

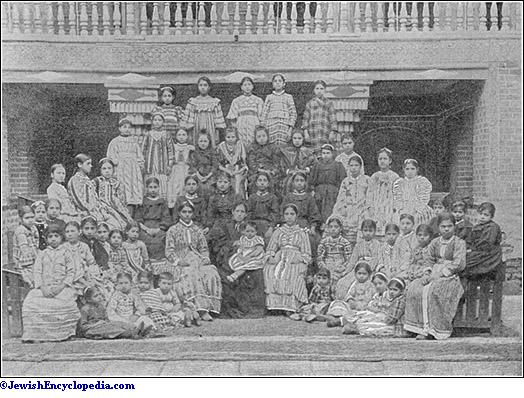
Girls' School of the Alliance Israélite Universelle, at Baghdad

Of the history of the Jews during the second half of the nineteenth century, very little is known. In 1876 and 1877, the city was attacked by a plague, and the Jews suffered terrible hardships in consequence. For a time, they were compelled to leave the city and to camp in the wilderness ("Ha-Ẓefirah," iii., No. 26, p. 202; iv., No. 20, p. 157; No. 24, p. 188; No. 28, p. 221). The relation of the Jews to their non-Jewish brethren seems, for the most part, to have been amicable. In 1860, however, an attempt was made to deprive the Jews of the Tomb of Ezekiel, situated a short distance outside of the city, and visited by Jews in the month of Ab. The Anglo-Jewish Association interposed in the matter; and the tomb was given back to its proper owners. A similar difficulty arose in the year 1889 with regard to a shrine called "Nabi Yusha" or "Kohen Yusha," situated about an hour's walk from the city in a small building shaded by eight gigantic trees. The high priest Joshua (Zechariah 3:1) is said to have been buried here; and, according to Teixeira and J. J. Benjamin, the Jews are accustomed to make pilgrimages thither every month. The shrine is maintained by the contributions of the Jews in Baghdad and in India, and is used not only as a synagogue, but as a burying place for the rabbis. One of the latter had been buried there in the year 1889, and because of a dispute as to whether the property really belonged to the Jews or to the Mohammedans, a persecution of the former was set on foot, and the principal Jews of the city, including the chief rabbi, were imprisoned by direction of the governor. A memorial on the subject was addressed to the marquis of Salisbury Oct. 25, 1889, on behalf of the Jewish Board of Deputies and the Anglo-Jewish Association, as a result of which the governor was removed. In 1899, the Jews numbered 35,000 souls, with about 30 to 35 synagogues known by the name of "Torah." Each Torah had a ḥakam, a "mu'allim kabir" (senior teacher), and a "mu'allim ṣaghir" (junior teacher). The Alliance Israélite Universelle founded a school for boys there in 1865, which in 1899 had 254 pupils; in 1895 the same body founded a school for girls which in 1899 had 132 pupils. There is also a Jewish apprentices' school for the education of Baghdad boys along industrial lines. The study of English has been encouraged by a foundation made by Silas Sassoon, a member of the Sassoon family which has its origin in Baghdad, David Sassoon, the founder of the family, having been born there, 1793. Obadiah Halevi (b.1810) was Hakham Bashi Of Baghdad during the mid 19th century.

During the last years of the nineteenth century, a few Hebrew books have been printed in Baghdad, especially by Solomon Behor Ḥuṣain; e.g., ספר פתרון חלומות (the second part of Solomon Almoli's work), 1892; מרפא לעצם of Isaac Farḥi; the story of Esther (קצת אסתר), told in Arabic by Joseph al-Shamsani; תהלה לדויד of Sasshon Mordecai Moses; and מעשה נסים on the wonders which happened in Palestine, taken from the שערי ירושלם. Of earlier works may be mentioned ספר קרנות צדיק of David Saliḥ Ya'ḳob, published by Raḥamim Reuben Mordecai & Co., 1867, and ספר משלי שועלים, printed by Judah Moses Joshua, 1874.

== 20th century ==
=== Rabbis ===
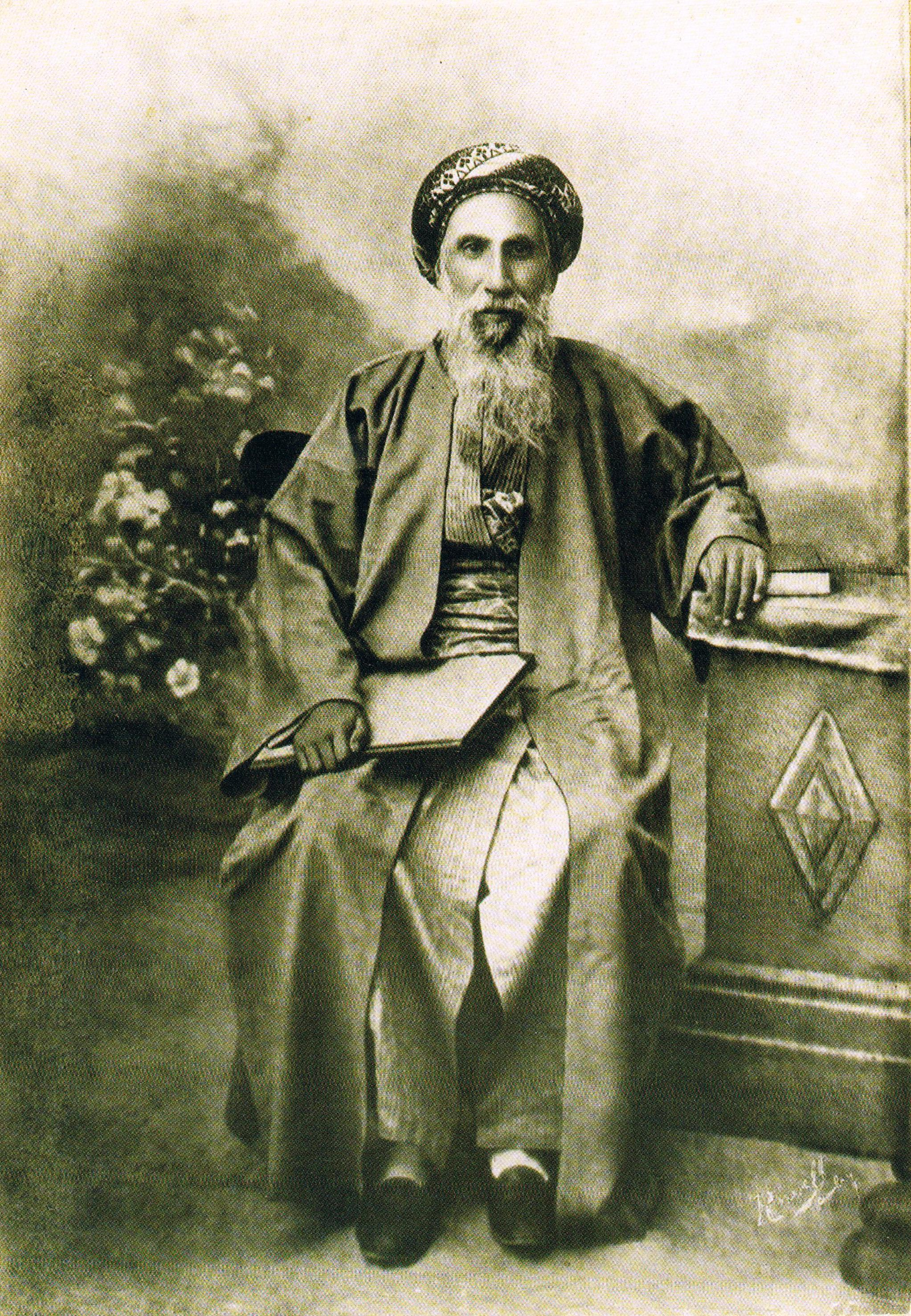
Haham Abraham Hillel of Baghdad

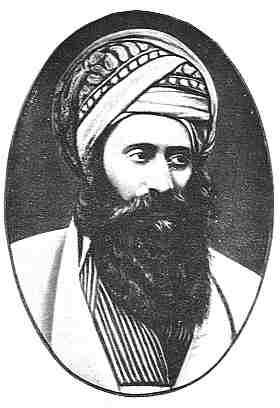
Haham Yosef Hayyim of Baghdad

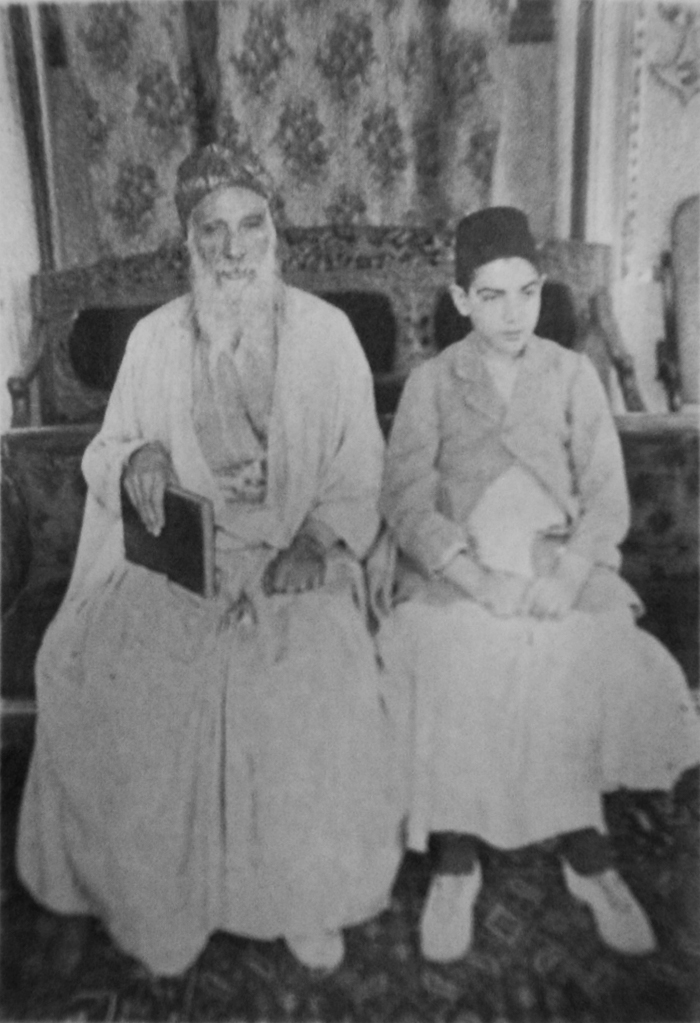
Haham Simon Aghassi of Baghdad and his son, approximately 1910

In 1912, S. N. Gottlieb lists Baghdad's rabbis:

- Haham Jecheskiel Mojshe Lewy Dayan
- Haham Abraham Hillel
- Haham Simon Aghassi
- Haham Iacob (son of Haham Yosef Hayyim)
- Haham Iehuda Aftyia

=== Demographics ===
The last Ottoman Census of 1917 stated that in Baghdad Sanjak out of the 202,000 population, 80,000 were Jews, 8,000 Kurds, 12,000 Christians, 800 Persians and rest Arab, Turk and other Muslims.

Population of Baghdad according to Ottoman Yearbook 1917						
Sanjak/Kaza	Jews	Kurds	Christians	Arab, Turks and other Muslims	Persians	Total
Baghdad Sanjak	80,000	8,000	12,000	101,400	800	202,200

=== 1968–2003 ===
As elsewhere in Iraq, much of the Baghdadi Jews left the country following the establishment of the State of Israel and subsequent anti-Jewish backlash. Their situation began to improve as the Ba'athist regime came under the control of Saddam Hussein. By that time, Baghdad still had the highest Jewish population in Iraq, like before the persecution. Around five synagogues and two Jewish schools remained in operation. The government eased on movement of the Jews and the Jews began to move abroad, resulting further Jewish decline. Iraq's Chief Rabbi lived in Baghdad, until his death in 1971. A large number of popular personalities, who were Jewish, remained in Iraq.

=== 21st century ===
In October 2026, the site of the former Shamash School was reopened, having been repurposed by the Iraqi government as a Jewish Heritage Museum. The Museum, funded by expatriate Jews of Iraqi descent, provides archival materials and recorded interviews highlighting the history of a community that had accounted for 25% of Baghdad's population and reached 90,000 across Iraq early in the 20th century but had dwindled in the wake of the 1941 Farhud and rising antisemitism, with as few as a half dozen Jews remaining at the time of the museum's opening.

== Antiquities of Jewish interest ==
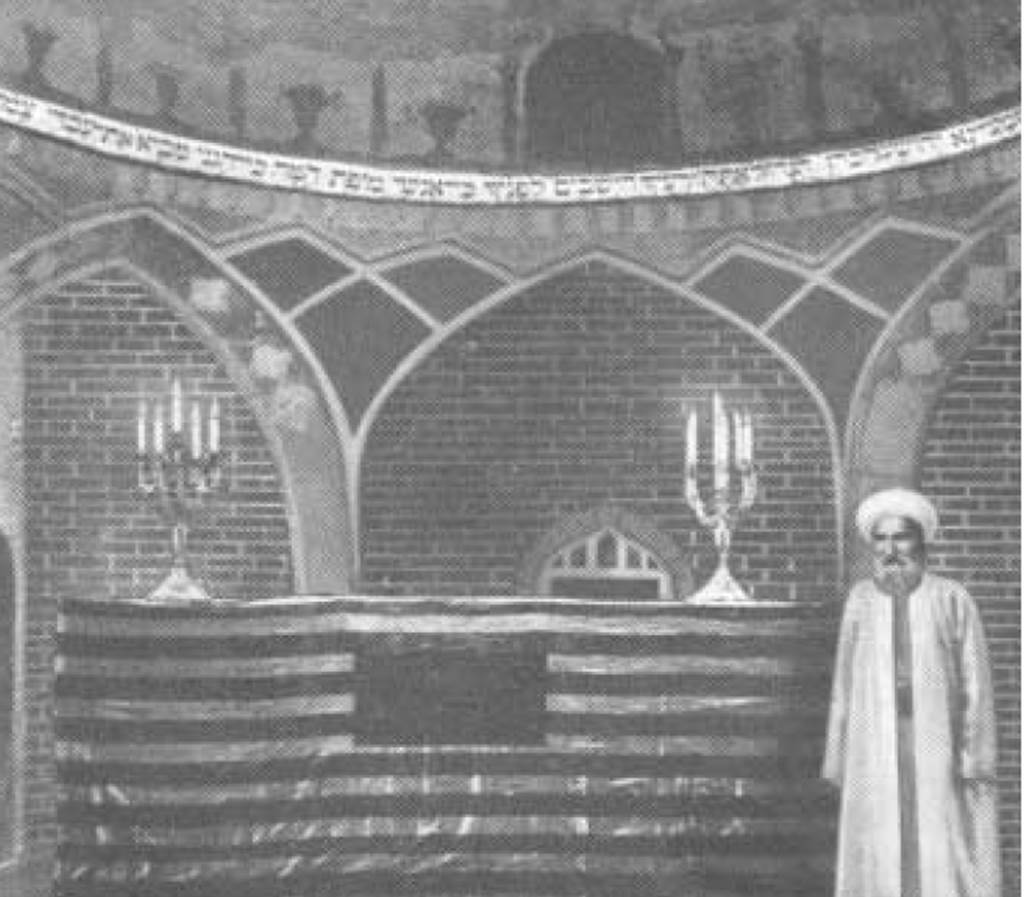
Chief Rabbi of Baghdad Ezra Dangoor in the Tomb of Joshua the High Priest

Baghdad and its vicinity possess a certain number of antiquities of Jewish interest. A large mosque, containing a tomb, is consecrated to the memory of a holy marabout, Abd el-Kader, called the Great. According to local Jewish tradition this is the tomb of Rabbi Jose ha-Galili. One hour's journey from the city, there is a mausoleum surrounded by eight almond trees. Popular belief declares this to be the tomb of the high priest Joshua mentioned in Zechariah 3; Haggai 1:1, etc. The Jews of Baghdad make pilgrimages to it once a month. Distant a journey of two days and a half southward of Baghdad is Hillah, where the ruins of ancient Babylon are shown, and near by is a well, called by the natives "Daniel's Well," into which, according to local tradition, Daniel was thrown. Near the bank of the Euphrates is Kabur Kepil, a village having a tomb which it is said is that of the prophet Ezekiel. At the side of the tomb are two ancient synagogues, one of which contains a sacred scroll, which some persons claim was the property of the prophet, and others that of Anan, the founder of Karaism. This synagogue also contains a genizah. The village is said to contain tombs of Zedekiah and other kings of Judah, and of the prophet Zephaniah. Three hours' journey from Baghdad, again toward the south, and not far from the Tigris, the tomb of Ezra the Scribe is shown (near Gurna (Kurna), between Baghdad and Bassorah), venerated equally by Jews and Arabs. It is covered with inscriptions now illegible.

Another tomb visited by the Jews of Baghdad is that of Daniel, near Hillah.

== Films and documentaries ==
- Farewell Baghdad (2013) by Nissim Dayan.
- Forget Baghdad: Jews and Arabs – The Iraqi Connection (2002) by Samir.
- Remember Baghdad (2016) by Fiona Murphy.
