= Jeleń (disambiguation) =

Jeleń may refer to:

- Jeleń (inhabited locality)
- Jeleń (surname)
- Jeleń Squadron, detachment of Home Army
- Jeleń coat of arms, Polish noble coat of arms
- Alternative name of the Brochwicz coat of arms
