= David Yellin =

Jewish educator, writer and scholar

- דוד ילין
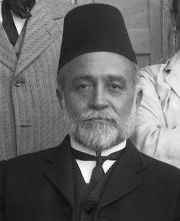
- Born: March 19, 1864; Jerusalem
- Died: December 12, 1941 (77)
- Resting place: Mount of Olives Jewish Cemetery
- Known for: founding Hebrew educational institutions, Hebrew language revival, research of medieval Hebrew literature
- Spouse: Ita Yellin
- Scientific career
- Fields: Linguistics, Hebrew literature

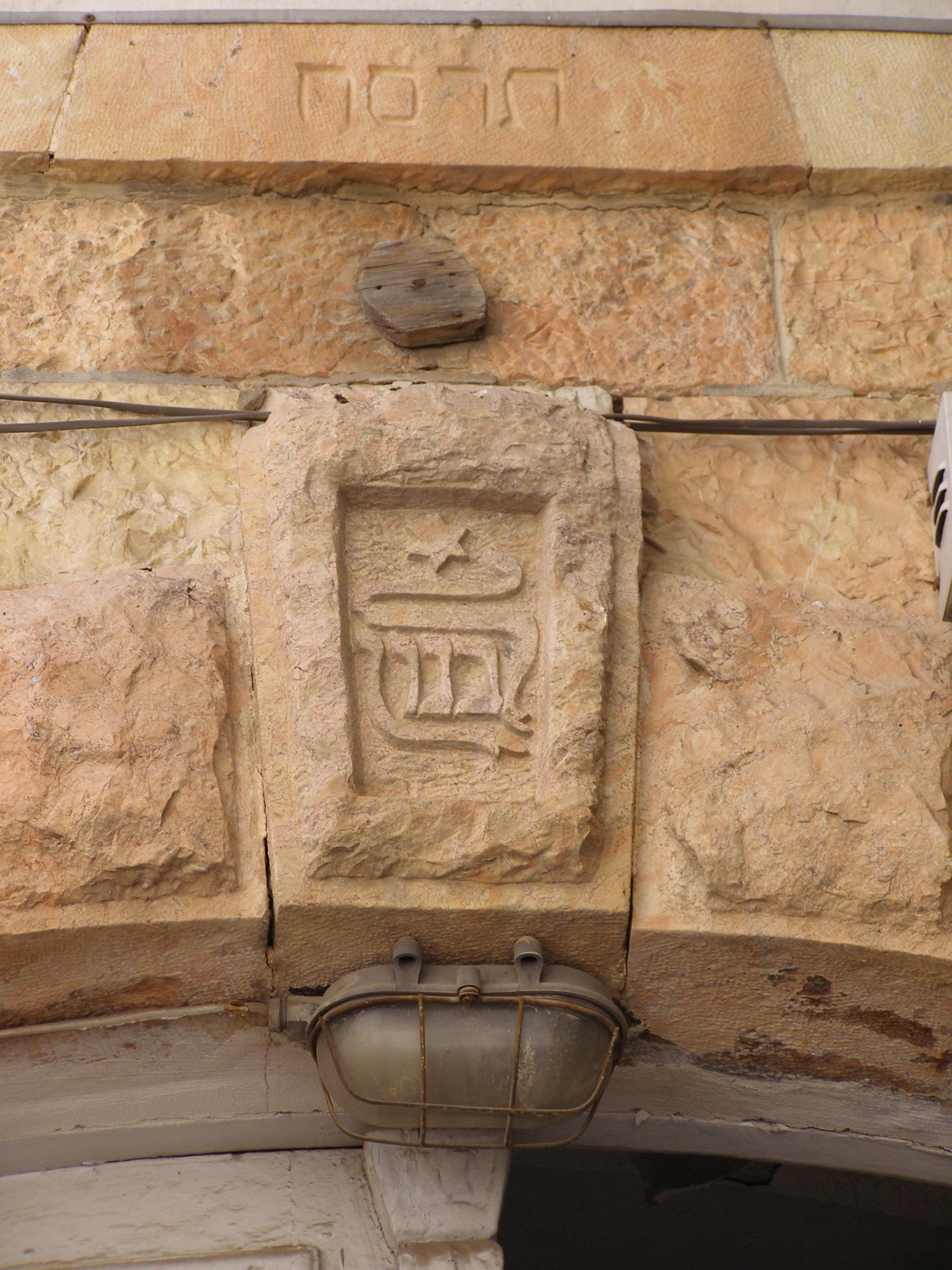
The keystone, adorned with the word "Ha-Levanon" on Yellin's house in Jerusalem

David Yellin (Hebrew: דוד ילין; March 19, 1864 – December 12, 1941) was an educator, a researcher of the Hebrew language and literature, a politician, one of the leaders of the Yishuv, the founder of the first Hebrew College for Teachers, one of the founders of the Hebrew Language Committee and the Israel Teachers Union, and the Zikhron Moshe neighborhood of Jerusalem.

== Biography ==
David Yellin was born in 1864 in Jerusalem. He was named after his grandfather, a financier and meshulach, who moved from Poland to Palestine under the Ottoman Empire in 1834. His father Yehoshua Yellin was one of the founders of the Nahalat Shiv'a neighborhood in Jerusalem and his mother Serah was the daughter of Shlomo Yehezkel Yehuda, the son of Ezekiel Judah, a Rabbi and educator from Iraq.

At the age of 14, Yellin started writing a newspaper, Har Tziyon ("Mount Zion"), which was published in one copy twice a month; he sustained it for 43 issues. He later wrote for the Hebrew newspapers Ha-Levanon, Hamagid and Ha-Melitz. In 1885 he married Ita, the daughter of rabbi Yechiel Michel Pines.

In 1890 he founded the Hebrew Language Committee together with Eliezer Ben-Yehuda, who served as chairman. Other members were rabbi Chaim Hirschensohn, Ze'ev Yavetz, Abraham Moses Luncz, rabbi Yaakov Meir (who later became the Sephardi chief rabbi), and Yechiel Michel Pines. The committee disbanded after one year, but was reestablished in 1904 when school teachers complained about the lack of Hebrew terminology. Yellin served as president until his death. In 1953 the Academy of the Hebrew Language was established on the basis of the committee.

In 1903 he participated with Menachem Ussishkin in the founding of the Assembly of the Land of Israel (הכנסייה הארצישראלית)—an attempt to create a representative body of the Jews in the Yishuv. This Assembly only met once but founded the Teachers Union, the first Jewish labor union in Palestine. Yellin was the president until 1906.

Like his younger brother Shlomo Yellin, David was a staunch supporter of the Ottoman Empire in the years after the Young Turk Revolution. He gave dozens of speeches praising the reforms of the Second Constitutional Era. In one 1909 speech he described "the unity and beauty which caused the whole people of the homeland to be brothers in one endeavor—the success of the homeland and its people and the pride of membership in one family: the Ottoman family". For both Yellin brothers the reforms represented the possibility of an Ottomanism that was compatible with the goals of Zionism. Ottoman Jews could enjoy the benefits of being citizens in a multi-ethnic Ottoman state and still maintain their distinctly Jewish cultural and social traditions.

In 1913, at the time of the War of the Languages in the Yishuv, Yellin resigned from the teachers college that was sustained by the Hilfsverein der deutschen Juden (Aid Society of German Jews), which supported German-language professional education in the Technion, and founded the Hebrew school for teachers. It still functions in the Beit HaKerem neighborhood of Jerusalem and is now named after its founder.

In 1917 during World War I Yellin was exiled to Damascus. After the Balfour Declaration was issued, and Mandatory Palestine established under the British Mandate for Palestine, Yellin began to support dividing Jerusalem into separate municipalities.

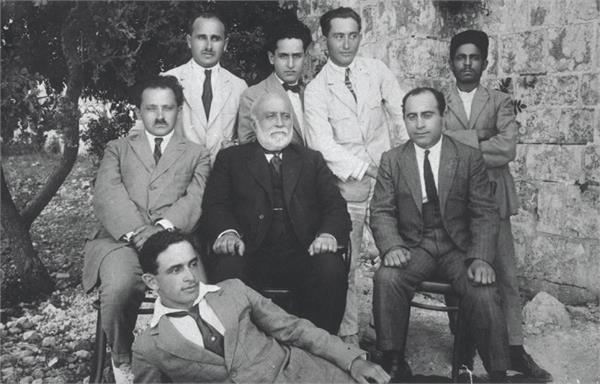
David Yellin 1923

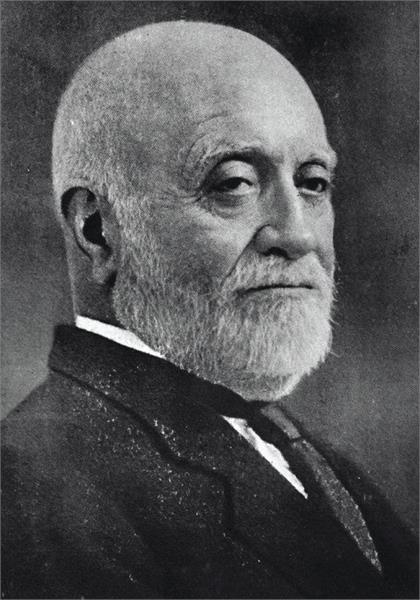
David Yellin 1923

From 1920 until 1928 he was a member of the Assembly of Representatives of Mandatory Palestine. In 1925, when the Hebrew University of Jerusalem was opened, he was invited to teach Hebrew grammar and medieval Hebrew poetry. In 1936 he was appointed as a professor of literature in the university. Yellin wrote numerous books about language, history, and medieval literature.

In October 1937 his fifth son, Avinoam, was murdered in the 1936–1939 Arab revolt in Palestine. As a consequence of these events and the Mandatory Palestine administration's handling of Jews, Yellin and his wife wrote in 1939 a letter to the High Commissioners for Palestine and Transjordan in which they explained why they are returning the awards that they received from the British government:

The award of honor was given to me by this government, for which political considerations are more important than any feeling of morality, and which cause it to assist those who killed and mauled not only my people (among them my innocent son!) and their people, but even their soldiers and officials. This award of honor is now an award of dishonor for me, and I return it to you, after it was given to me 21 years ago, when the spirit of the government of his majesty the King of England was different.

— Davar, ר' דויד ואיטה ילין החזירו את אותות-הכבוד שלהם, May 23, 1939

Ita added in her letter:

Now, after the publishing of the White paper, which completely reneges all the promises of his majesty's government to help the people of Israel, I see myself obliged to return this award of honor to his majesty's government.

Yellin died in 1941 and was buried in the Mount of Olives Jewish Cemetery. Several streets and educational institutions in Israel are named after him.

=== Family ===
His wife Ita was the daughter of Yechiel Michel Pines, and Yosef Meyuchas was his brother in law. They had seven children: a daughter, five sons, and another daughter:

- Their second child Eliezer was an engineer, an architect, and the husband of the musician Telma Yellin. They were among the founders of the Rehavia neighborhood in Jerusalem.
- Their third child Aviezer was the general secretary of the Teachers Union and one of the founders of Maccabi World Union.
- The sixth child Avinoam was an educator and an Oriental studies researcher. The botanical garden in the Yellin teachers college is named after him.
- The youngest daughter Serah Ahuva married Leo Picard, one of the most prominent geologists in Israel.

Yellin's sister Sarah was the wife of the chief justice of Hebron in the beginning of the 20th century, Yosef Mani, the grandchild of Eliyahu Mani, one of the leaders of the Iraqi Jewish community. His sister Rachel was the wife of Yehezkel Danin, one of the founders of Tel Aviv. His younger brother Shlomo Yellin was a lawyer, Ottoman nationalist, member of the Committee of Union and Progress ("Young Turks") and strong supporter of the Ottoman Constitution of 1908 that was implemented following the Young Turk Revolution.

== Contribution to the Hebrew language ==
Yellin was one of the central people in the process of the revival of the Hebrew language, and particularly active in coining neologisms. Unlike Eliezer Ben-Yehuda, who liked using Arabic words for creating Hebrew neologisms, Yellin preferred using only classical Hebrew sources. He was particularly interested in Biblical Hapax legomena, the meanings of which are not always clear, and he reused them, sometimes changing their meaning. For example, he reused the word minzar, which appears in the book of Nahum, and probably means "king", to denote monastery (by association with the word nazir, monk). Other words that he created, and which became common in Modern Hebrew are words for photography (צילום), joke (בדיחה), agriculturalist (חקלאי), actor (שחקן), and others.

Together with Yehuda Gur he published a complete Hebrew dictionary in 1920.

== See also ==
- Education in Israel
- Pro-Jerusalem Society - David Yellin was a member of its leading Council
- Yellin, Yellen, Jelen surnames
