= Karel Svoboda (artist) =

Czech/Austrian painter

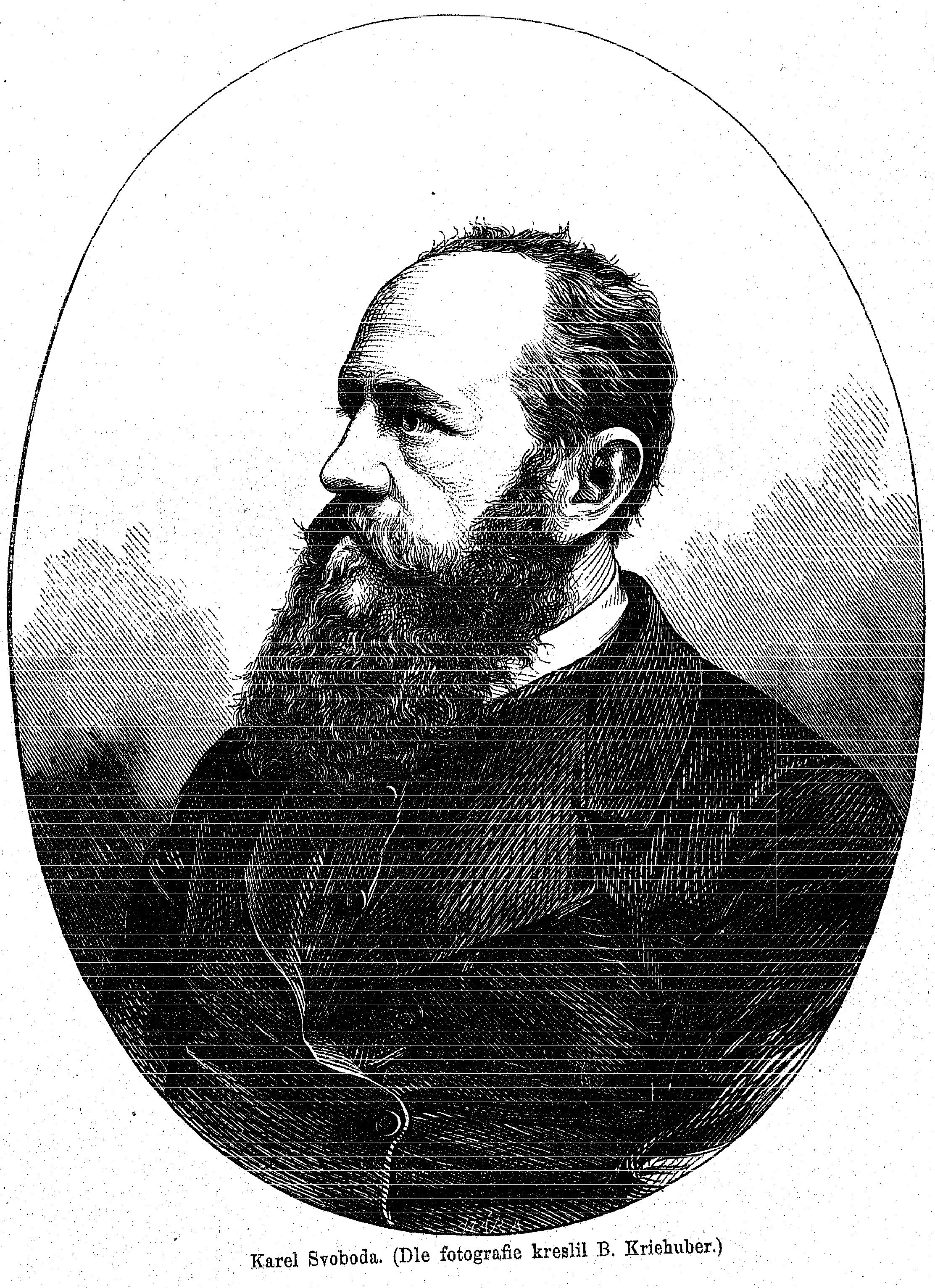
Karel Svoboda on a lithograph by Friedrich Kriehuber (1870)

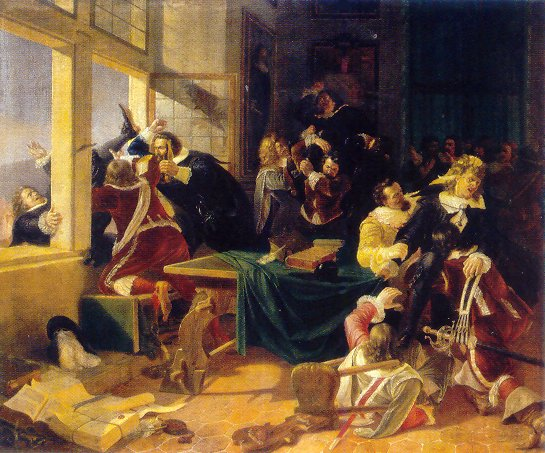
The Defenestration of Prague of 1618 (1848)

Karel Svoboda (14 June 1824 – 13 September 1870) was a Czech painter. He painted primarily historical scenes, which are notable for their accurate detail. He worked in Prague and Vienna.

== Biography ==
Karel Svoboda was born on 14 June 1824 in Plánice. He was orphaned at an early age and went to live with his uncle Václav, who was a professor at the Gymnasium in Prague. Karel learned both philosophy and drawing under his tutelage. His talent attracted the attention of Count Franz von Thun, who helped him to enter the Academy of Fine Arts, where he studied under Christian Ruben.

His painting of the second Defenestration of Prague was widely admired and prompted the writer, Ljudevit Gaj, to invite him to Zagreb, where he lived for several months, painting local characters and scenes from Illyrian history. Later that year, he married the daughter of composer Alois Jelen and, in 1851, moved with her to Vienna. Despite relocating, he took an assignment to create historical murals at Queen Anne's Summer Palace (Le Belvédère) back in Prague.

Over the next few years, he executed several major commissions, including posters for the Five-hundredth Anniversary of Vienna in 1865. He also served as a drawing instructor at the Gymnasium in Schottenfeld (Neubau) and provided illustrations for several books of poetry, including the "Rukopis Královédvorský" (Königinhofer Handschrift), a medieval song collection which became the source of much controversy, as it was believed to be a forgery by the Czech philologist Václav Hanka (an assertion which later proved to be true, although the arguments continue even now).

He exhibited widely and painted eleven frescoes at the Bishop's Palace in Czernowitz as well as ten panels on the story of "Iphigenia" for the Vienna State Opera. Many of works were reproduced as woodcuts or on copperplate. His wife died in 1869. Svoboda died a year later on 13 September 1870 at the "Florence Spa" in Vienna, of a heart attack.
