= Yelin =

Yelin is a surname. It may refer to:

- Gilah Yelin Hirsch (born 1944), Canadian-American multidisciplinary artist
- Barbara Yelin (born 1977), German cartoonist
- Rudolf Yelin (1864-1940), German painter
- Shulamis Yelin (1913-2002), Canadian writer and educator
- Susanne Yelin (born 1968), German physicist

== See also ==
- Yellin
