= Friedrich von Keller (painter) =

German painter (1840–1914)

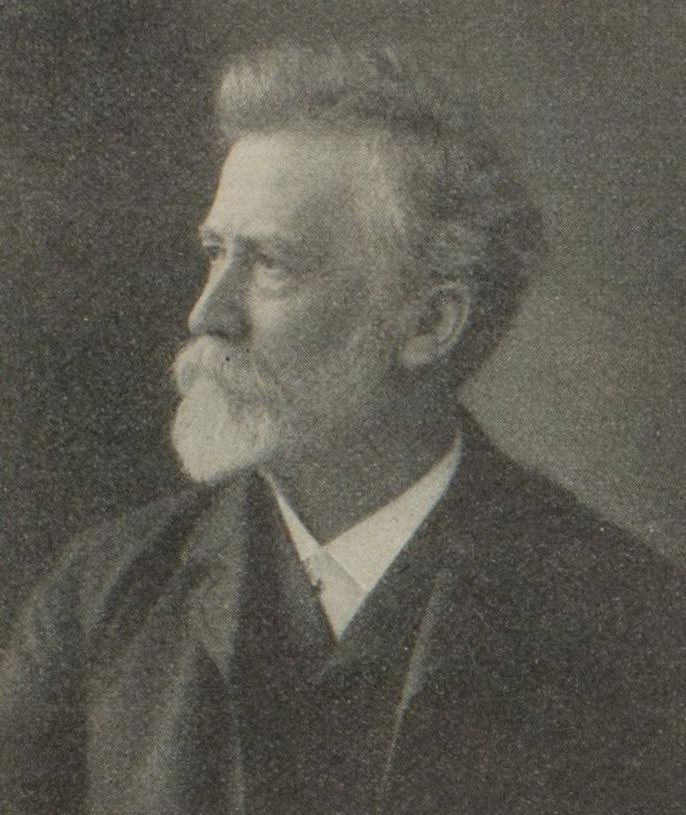
Friedrich von Keller (1908)

Friedrich von Keller (18 February 1840, Ludwigsburg – 26 August 1914, Abtsgmünd) was a German genre painter.

== Biography ==
He was the youngest of ten children born to Johann Jakob Keller, a vintner, who died when Friedrich was only nine. Thanks to the support of some patrons, he was able to study drawing at the local trade school. He earned his living as a general craftsman.

At the age of eighteen, he went to Stuttgart to attend the Royal Art School, but the tuition was too high, so he took drawing classes in the evening at the Polytechincal School. Finally, at the age of twenty-seven, he was awarded a royal scholarship of 125 Ducats and was able to attend the art school, where he studied with Bernhard von Neher and Heinrich von Rustige. During his studies, he supported himself by painting coats-of-arms and signs.

In 1871, he moved to Munich and became a free-lance artist. He continued to improve his technique by working with Wilhelm von Lindenschmit at the Academy of Fine Arts. In 1872, he began a series of scenes depicting stonebreakers at work, which are his best known paintings. He married in 1876.

He was appointed a professor of genre painting at the Royal Art School in 1883, succeeding Carl von Häberlin, who had resigned. His notable students there included Paula von Wächter, Bernhard Buttersack, Maria Caspar-Filser, Adolf Fleischmann, Oskar Schlemmer, and Rudolf Yelin.

In 1908, his twenty-fifth anniversary as a Professor was celebrated at the art school, which had become a State Academy. The following year, King Wilhelm II presented him with the Grand Cross of the Order of the Crown. He retired in 1913.

== Selected paintings ==
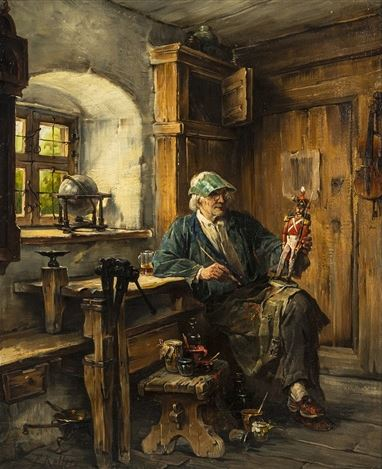
A Puppet Maker in His Workshop

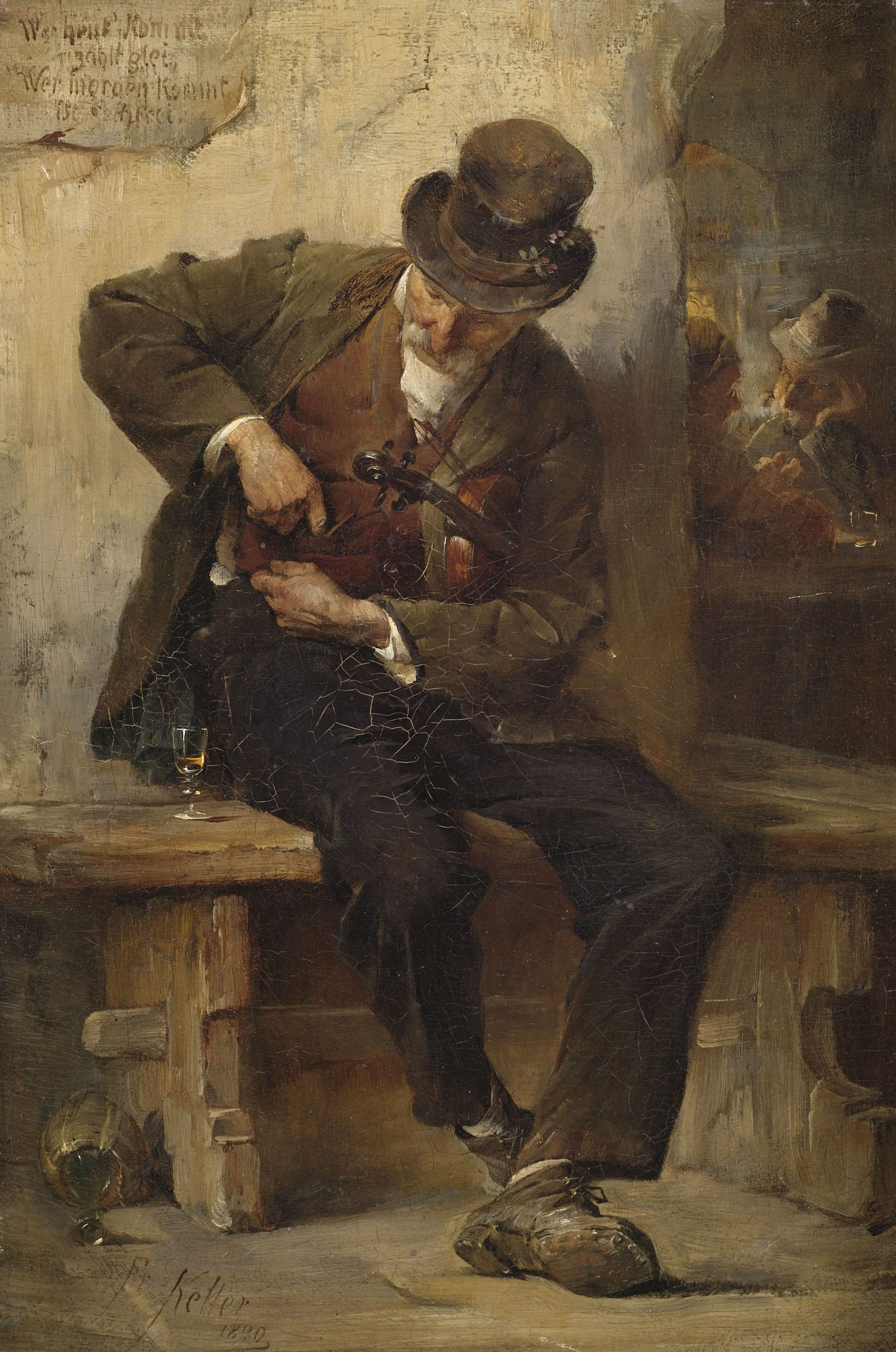
Street Musician at a Tavern

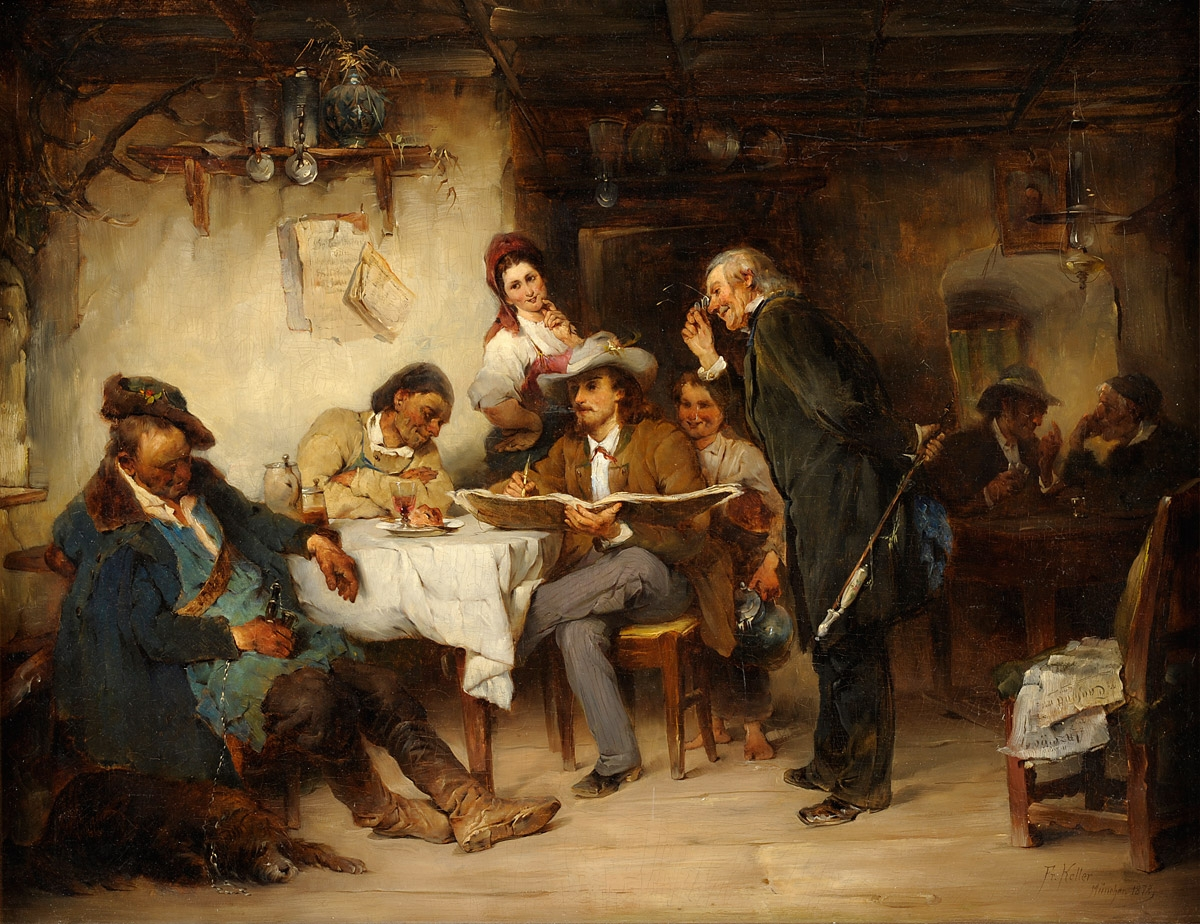
Studies from Nature

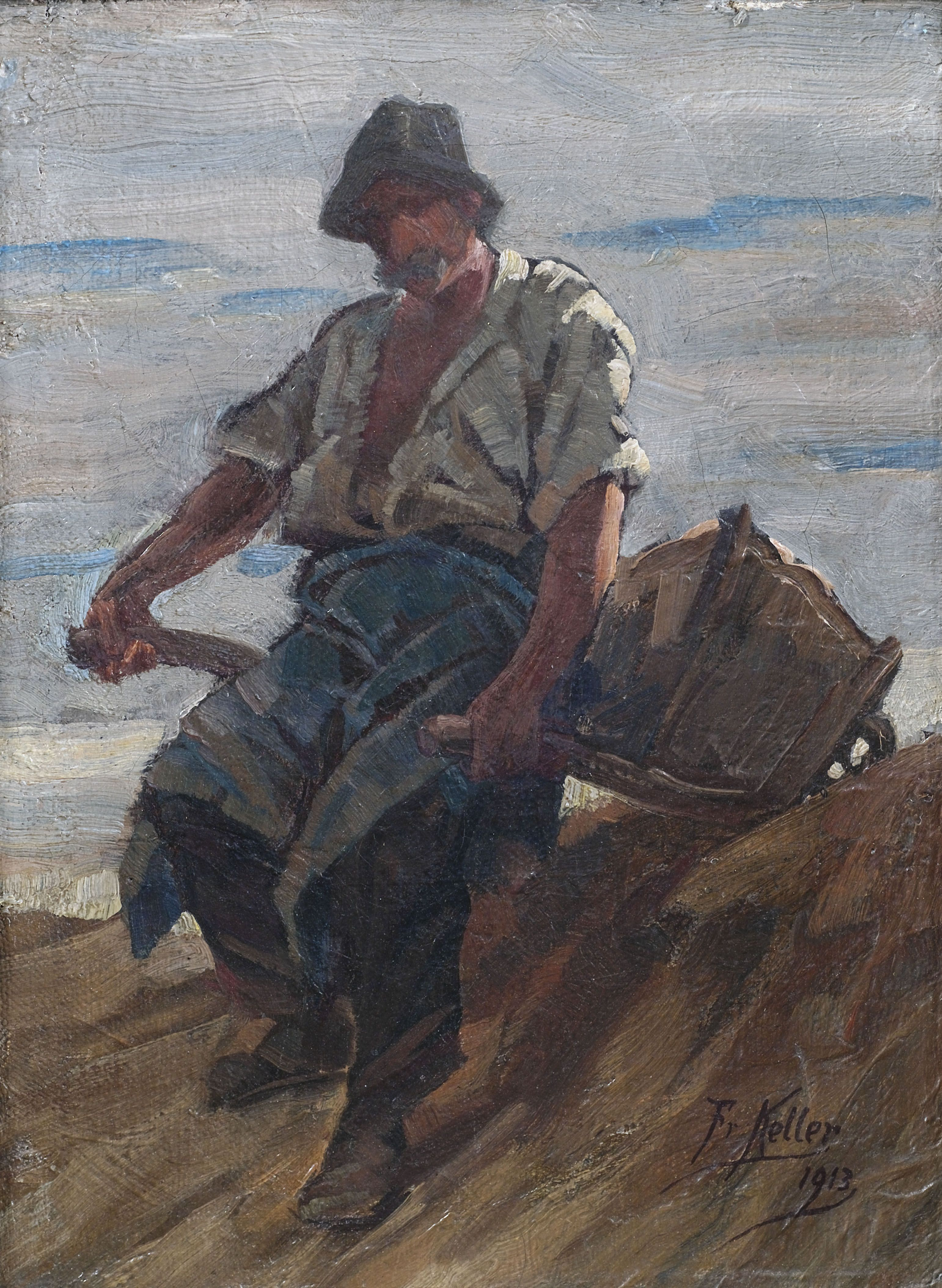
Stonebreaker with Wheelbarrow

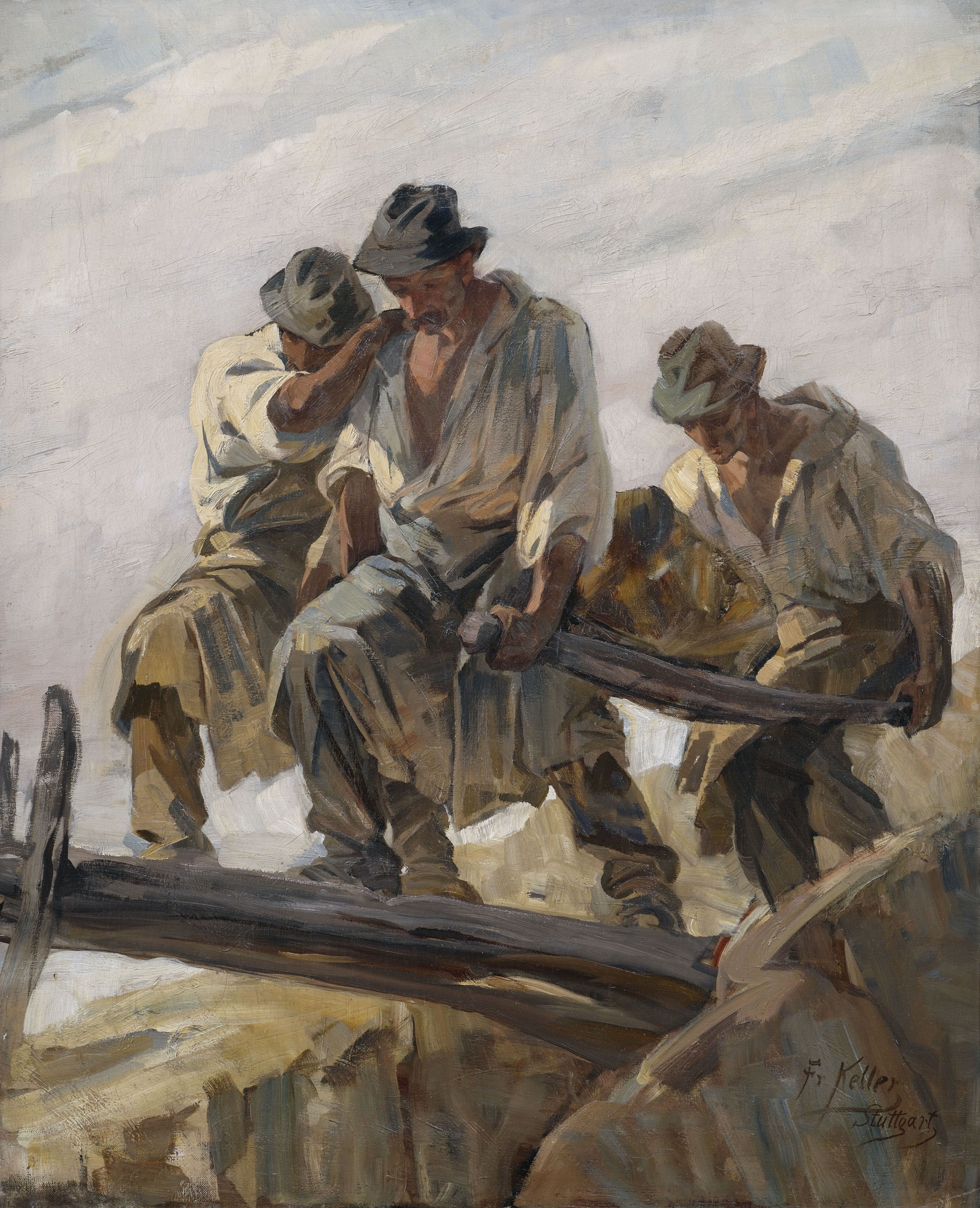
Stonebreakers with Boulders

== Sources ==
- Max Diez: "Die heimische Schule Keller Haug Speyer Landenberger", In: Julius Baum, Max Diez (Ed.): Die Stuttgarter Kunst der Gegenwart, Deutsche Verlags-Anstalt, Stuttgart 1913, pp. 37 ff., 40–46 (Online)
- Thomas Maier, Bernd Müllerschön: Die Schwäbische Malerei um 1900. Die Stuttgarter Kunstschule/Akademie, Professoren und Maler; Geschichte – Geschichten – Lebensbilder. Stuttgart 2000, pp. 77–81 ISBN 978-3-935252-00-3
- "Keller, Friedrich von". In: Verzeichnis der Gemäldegalerie im Kgl. Museum der bildenden Künste zu Stuttgart, Das Museum, Stuttgart 1917, pg.42 (Online)
- Werner Fleischhauer: "Keller, Friedrich von". In: Hans Vollmer (Ed.): Allgemeines Lexikon der Bildenden Künstler von der Antike bis zur Gegenwart, Vol.20: Kaufmann–Knilling. E. A. Seemann, Leipzig 1927, pp. 100–101.
- Eugen Keuerleber (1977). "Keller, Friedrich von". Neue Deutsche Biographie (in German). Vol. 11. Berlin: Duncker & Humblot. p. 436. (full text online).
