= Solomon Ma'tuk =

Iraqi Jewish astronomer and poet

Solomon Ma'tuk, or Sulayman ben David Ma'tuk or Matuq (18th century) was a communal leader, astronomer and Jewish devotional poet of Baghdad, whose piyyutim are still incorporated in Iraqi Jewish liturgy.

== Family origin ==
Sulayman ben David Ma'tuk was a descendant of Rabbi Ma'tuk, the Nasi or Prince of the Jewish community of 'Ana, in Iraq.

Iraqi Jewish tradition places in ‘Ana the ancient city of Nehardea and the centre of learning instrumental to the development of the Talmud and Rabbinic Judaism, the Nehardea Academy. The Talmud cites the Jewish community of Nehardea was known to be one of the oldest in Mesopotamia, dating from the first Babylonian exile. It was to become the first seat of the Exilarch and his Beth Din. The Ma'tuk family are recorded as having lived in 'Ana for centuries. During the 17th and 18th century the head of the Ma'tuk family, as leaders of the Jewish community held the post of Sarraf-Bashi, or treasurer to the governor of Anah. The community held ties with the Jewish communities in the Land of Israel, especially Safed and with Aleppo, Damascus and Baghdad.

The Ma'tuk family fled from 'Ana to Baghdad under threats and suffering from the persecution of a tyrannical Ottoman governor in the first quarter of the 17th century. This was during the period when the Jewish community of Baghdad was reemerging after ceasing to exist after the Mongol sacking of the city in the 14th century. The 19th century German ethnographer H. Petermann observed that the oldest Jewish families of Baghdad hailed from ‘Ana, amongst them being the Ma’tuk family. In Baghdad the 18th and 19th century the family gained considerable renown and importance amongst Iraqi Jews.

The family produced several notable scribes and poets and had in its possession an important library of both Jewish literary and religious works, some of which were produced in Spain prior to the Edict of Expulsion.

== Biography ==
Sulayman ben David Ma'tuk was famed in Baghdad for having the largest library in the city.

He was reputed to have been the possessor of a library of over seven thousand volumes, both manuscripts and printed books.

In his lifetime he was known across the Jewish communities of the Middle East as a great collector of Hebrew manuscripts. This included Arabic translations of the Pentateuch, Song of Songs, the Book of Ruth, Book of Esther, Book of Lamentations and the Book of Daniel. Also in the library was the Kabbalistic work Ha Kanah, the poem Mi Khamokhah and miscellany written by Abraham ben Hayyeem ha-Sefaradi in the 15th century that had previously belonged to Simeon Mizrahi. Present was also a Talmud methodology of Jeshua ben Joseph of Tlemcen, written in the hand of his paternal uncle Joseph ben Sulayman Ma'tuk in the year 1680.

He excelled as a scholar, poet and communal leader.

Many of his surviving poems tell of the suffering of the Jews of Baghdad at the hands of a tyrannical governor.

One of his most famous poems, recounts how he was forced to hide in a hammam (Turkish bathhouse), to escape persecution, after which he left Baghdad with his family for Basra.

From his work as an astronomer several geometrical manuscripts, including one combined with a commentary and a treatise on the astrolabe have survived.

He was eulogized by Saleh ben Joseph Masliah, a Jewish poet from Baghdad.

The recorded contents of the famed Ma'tuk library offer an insight into how the Jews of Baghdad were linked into a Mediterranean community of Sephardic rabbis and of the place of scientific learning in the culture of 18th century Iraqi Jewry.

== Legacy ==
The piyyutim of Sulayman ben David Ma'tuk were considered of such beauty his works were published by Judeo-Arabic speaking Iraqi Jews and Baghdadi Jews in communities in India and Iraq. They are still incorporated in the traditional Iraqi Jewish liturgy. These Hebrew devotional poems, are infused with Persian Arabic, and fused with traditional Arabic poetry and music.

During the lifetime of his grandson the family name was changed to Judah, or Yahuda or Yehuda in Hebrew. For a while one branch retained the name Yahuda-Ma'tuk, eventually most branches switching to Judah.

In the early 19th century persecution at the hands of Dawud Pasha of Baghdad, drove many of the leading Jewish families of Baghdad across the Indian Ocean and to found the communities across Asia known as the Baghdadi Jews. This included Sulayman ben David Ma'tuk's descendants. Fleeing Baghdad, the family moved to India, when Ezekiel Judah, crossed the Indian Ocean in 1825 and was to become one of the founders of the Jewish community of Calcutta and one of the leaders of the Baghdadi Jews of Asia. In the 19th century the commercial branch of the family would stay in British India, eventually migrating to Britain, whilst the Rabbinical line moved to Jerusalem, building up Iraqi and Sephardi Judaism in the community and helping to establishing the first modern Jewish agricultural colony in Palestine, at Motza, outside Jerusalem.

In the 20th century the works of Sulayman ben David Ma'tuk were studied by the renowned bibliophile David Solomon Sassoon, the grandson of David Sassoon, who had in his personal collection several books, including Jonah Gerondi's Sha'are Teshuvah, crafted in Fano in 1505, Judah Ha Levy's Kuzari, crafted on Fano in 1506 and David ibn Yahya's Limmudim, from Constantinople in 1542.

His poems were stored at the Sassoon collections of the British Library in London. Some have since been dispersed with the auctioning of the Sassoon collection but many reside with the remaining collection at the library of the University of Toronto.

Sulayman ben David Ma'tuk's descendants include Abraham Yahuda and Tim Judah.
