= Shlomo Yellin =

Jewish lawyer and Ottoman nationalist

Shlomo Yellin (1874–1912) was a Jewish lawyer and Ottoman nationalist who was born in the Old City of Ottoman Jerusalem.

== Background ==
Shlomo Yellin was the younger brother by 10 years of David Yellin. He was a member of the Beirut branch of the Committee of Union and Progress (CUP) (also called the "Young Turks") and knew Yiddish, Arabic, English, French, Hebrew and the "Judaeo-Spanish" dialect spoken by the Sephardim. Speaking of the Ottoman Empire, Yellin said "The noble Ottoman nation is made up of different groups who live together, who for the sake of homeland [vatan] have shaped themselves into one mass." His rhetoric of martyrdom for what the called the "sacred homeland" invoked an Ottoman nationalist rhetoric rather than the traditional Islamist language.

== On the Ottoman Empire ==
Speaking in Beirut in 1909, Yellin said:

"In the Ottoman Empire the different peoples are equal to one another and it is not lawful to divide according to race; the Turkish, Arab, Armenian and Jewish elements have mixed one with the other, and all of them are connected together, molded into one shape for the holy vatan. Each part of the nation took upon itself the name of 'Ottoman' as s source of pride and an honorable mark."

Two pamphlets written by Yellin were dedicated in "profound admiration" to the CUP, which had implemented the Ottoman Constitution of 1908. Yellin's brand of Ottoman nationalism was linked to the Constitution of 1908 (also called the "Second Constitutional Era"). His conception of Ottoman identity transcended differences of religion, ethnicity and even language. During this period he and his brother saw no contradictions between Zionism and Ottoman nationalism.

Shlomo died in 1912.
