= Yellin =

== People ==
Yellin is the surname of:

- Aryeh Leib Yellin (1820–1886), Polish rabbi
- Bob Yellin (born 1936), American bluegrass musician
- David Yellin (1864–1941), Jewish leader and educator in Palestine
- Dustin Yellin (born 1975), American artist
- Jean Fagan Yellin, American historian
- Jerry Yellin (1924–2017), United States Air Force officer
- Jessica Yellin (born 1971), American TV journalist
- Linda Yellin, American memoirist, novelist, and humorist
- Nathan Yellin-Mor (1913–1980), Russian-born revisionist Zionist activist, Lehi leader and Israeli politician
- Pete Yellin (1941–2016), American jazz musician
- Robert Yellin, American Japanese ceramics specialist
- Roei Yellin (born 1981), Israeli sprint canoer
- Samuel Yellin (1885–1940), American master blacksmith
- Tamar Yellin, English teacher and author
- Yehoshua Yellin (1843–1924), leader of the Old Yishuv
- Yitzhak Yaakov Yellin (1885–1964), Israeli Hebrew language and press pioneer

== Fictional ==
- Yellin, a character in William Goldman's The Princess Bride

== See also ==
- Yelin
- Jelen
- Yellen
