= Abraham Yahuda =

American Jewish orientalist (1877–1951)

Abraham S. Yahuda
- אברהם שלום יהודה
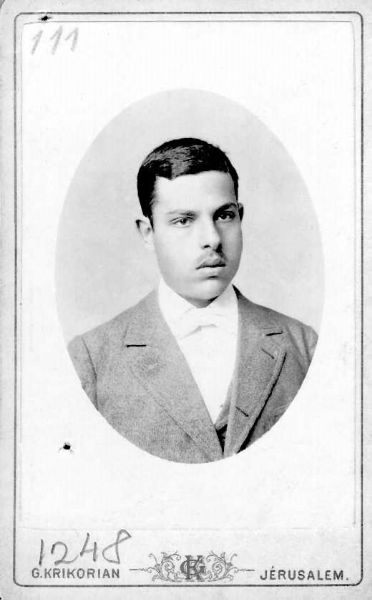
- Yahuda in his youth
- Born: June 18, 1877; Jerusalem, Mutasarrifate of Jerusalem, Ottoman Empire
- Died: 1951 (aged 73–74); Saratoga Springs, New York, United States
- Scientific career
- Fields: Orientalist; Writer; Linguist; Teacher
- Workplaces: University of Madrid; University of Berlin; New School for Social Research

Abraham Shalom Yahuda (Hebrew: אברהם שלום יהודה; June 18, 1877 (Note: Hebrew date: 7 Tammuz 5637) – 1951) was a Jerusalem-born American polymath, orientalist, teacher, writer, researcher, linguist, and collector of rare documents. After failing in his efforts to help steer the nascent Zionist movement into embracing attitudes of the Orient, he relocated to Europe and the United States, where he lectured at the New School for Social Research in New York.

== Early life and education ==
Abraham Shalom Yahuda was born in Jerusalem to the well-to-do Iraqi-Jewish Yahuda (Judah) family. His father Binyamin Yehezkel Yahuda emigrated to Ottoman Palestine from Baghdad at age 9 with his father Shlomo Yehezkel Yahuda, who in turn was the son of Ezekiel Judah, a communal leader, Talmudist and trader from Baghdad and Calcutta. His mother, Bekhora-Rivka Bergman, was from a Frankfurt Jewish family. The language spoken at home was Arabic. As a youth, he studied the works of Rashi and the Talmud under private tutors, later enrolling in his grandfather's yeshiva. He also studied under his brother, the educator Isaac Ezekiel Yahuda. Their cousin was the educator David Yellin. At age 15, Yahuda studied languages under Hayim Kalmi, and attained proficiency in literary Arabic.

In 1894, Yahuda published an article in HaMelitz about the utility of the Amharic and Arabic languages. That same year he wrote his first book (in Hebrew) entitled Arab Antiquities. He published his essay "The Benevolent Heroes of Arabia" in the Palestine Annual almanac published by Abraham Moses Luncz.

In 1895, Yahuda set out for Germany, where he spent time in Darmstadt, Frankfurt, and Nuremberg in preparation for his college career. He studied at the University of Strasbourg from 1899 through 1904—including an intervening year at Heidelberg University—earning his Phd in Oriental studies. He later taught at the Hochschule für die Wissenschaft des Judentums in Berlin from 1905 through 1914. While in Europe, Yahuda came into contact with Joseph Klausner and Shaul Tchernichovsky, young Russian Zionists who would later rise to prominence. He participated in evening classes, where he gave lectures on conversational Hebrew. Yahuda relocated to Madrid during the First World War, where he was appointed as chair of rabbinic languages and literature by royal decree in 1915. He lectured there at the Complutense University of Madrid until 1920. Yahuda looked to historical al-Andalus as an example of how Judaic scholars contributed to Arab culture and language. He believed that certain classic works of Judaism from this period—such as Chovot HaLevavot—could only be fully understood with a proper knowledge of the Arabic language.

== Attempts at Orientalizing Zionism ==
In 1896, Yahuda met the founder of modern political Zionism—Theodor Herzl—for the first time in London. He asked Herzl to establish relations with the Arabs of what was to eventually become Mandatory Palestine in order to secure their support for the Zionist project. Herzl replied that there was no need for that, since he was already engaging directly with the great powers. The following year, Yahuda attended the First Zionist Congress in Basel, Switzerland, where he repeated his request of Herzl to work with the Arabs, and was again rebuffed. Reuven Snir explained Herzl's refusal by attributing it to Herzl's belief in the superiority of Western culture. In his memoirs, Yahuda expressed his disappointment with Herzl's reaction, interpreting it as another example of the arrogance of European Jews towards Arabs.

In 1920, Yahuda was invited by new mayor of Jerusalem Raghib al-Nashashibi to deliver a lecture in literary Arabic to an audience consisting of Muslims, Christians, and Jews. In attendance was Herbert Samuel, the newly appointed High Commissioner for Palestine. In his lecture, Yahuda discussed the golden age of Jewish culture in Spain, which he aimed to promote as a model for inter-religious relations within a modern political entity. Directing his attention towards the Palestinian Arabs in attendance, he encouraged their active involvement in shaping relations with Jews, in contradiction to the prevailing attitude which sought to deny or minimize their place in the new political structure of Mandatory Palestine. Referencing this lecture, Yuval Evri cited the various reactions it provoked, both positive and negative. While Muslim intellectuals embraced the acknowledgment of their culture, they generally objected to the Balfour Declaration of 1917. Within Zionist circles, Yahuda faced criticism for advocating the assimilation of Jewish culture into Arab culture, and his political vision for the revival of Judeo-Arabic culture was never realized. Disillusioned with the Zionist leadership—who impeded his attainment of a professorship at the new Hebrew University of Jerusalem—Yahuda returned to Europe. After falling-out with Chaim Weizmann over Zionist attitudes towards Arabs, Yahuda joined Zeev Jabotinsky's Revisionist Zionist Movement, and was thereafter actively sponsored by the latter.

== Later life ==
Yahuda was a notable linguist and writer, translating and interpreting many ancient Arabic documents including various works of pre-Islamic poetry and medieval Judeo-Arabic texts. In 1935, he published The Accuracy of the Bible, a work which would spark a significant amount of international discussion.

Albert Einstein and Yahuda corresponded with each other intensively throughout the 1930s. In 1940, Einstein arranged for Yahuda and his wife to travel to New York. Later that summer, Yahuda visited Einstein at his Lake Saranac summer retreat in the Adirondack Mountains. Afterward, in September of the same year, Einstein sent a letter to Yahuda from Lake Saranac expressing his fascination for Isaac Newton's religious views and interpretations on the bible. Einstein's letter was likely inspired by his conversations with Yahuda at Lake Saranac. Yahuda settled in New York City in 1942, where he became affiliated with the New School for Social Research.

== Death and legacy ==
Yahuda died while vacationing at Saratoga Springs, New York in 1951. Upon his death, much of Yahuda's vast collection of rare documents was donated to the Jewish National and University Library, amounting to about fifteen hundred documents. Much of the donated material was of Arabic origin. However, several hundred items were in ancient Hebrew as well. Also included were a number of documents from other countries, including a number of illuminated manuscripts and unpublished documents penned by Isaac Newton. The collection of 7,500 handwritten theological papers was granted recognition within UNESCO's Memory of the World International Register, recognizing documents which should be preserved for future generations.

His remains were transferred to Israel in November 1952 for burial at Har HaMenuchot in Jerusalem.

In 1952, a posthumous work by Yahuda titled Dr. Weizmann's Errors on Trial was published. This work responded to Chaim Weizmann's memoir Trial and Error (1949). The work had a somewhat scathing tone as a result of the slight he felt in being anonymously referred to in Weizmann's memoir as a Spanish professor of marrano background.

While Yahuda anticipated the damage that would be inflicted by the Zionists on Arab–Israeli relations, he was not the only one. Scholars like Moshe Behar and Zvi Ben Dor Benite associate him with other Palestinian Jews like Hayyim Ben Kiki (1887–1935), who authored a text in 1921 criticizing the behavior of European Zionists in The Question of All Questions: Concerning the Settling of the Land (in Hebrew), and Nissim Malul (1893–1957), a Palestinian Jewish Zionist who advocated for mandatory Arabic language education for European Jews settled in Palestine to improve relations with non-Jewish Palestinians.

== Publications ==
- The Language of the Pentateuch in Its Relation to Egyptian (1933)

== Cultural influences ==
In his 1993 play Hysteria, British playwright Terry Johnson created a character partly based on Yahuda's attempt to convince Sigmund Freud not to publish his final book, Moses and Monotheism.

== Bibliography ==
- Evri, Yuval (January 2017). "Translating the Arab-Jewish Tradition From al-Andalus to Palestine/Land of Israel". Forum Transregionale Studien. Berlin. doi:10.25360/01-2017-00005.
