= Paula von Waechter =

German painter (1860–1944)

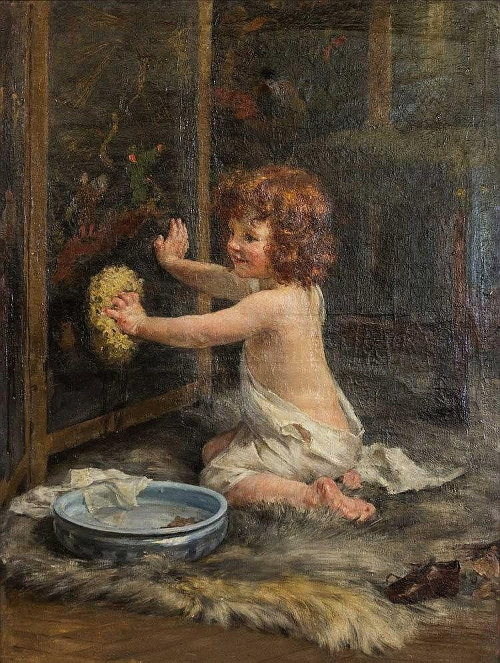
The Little Redhead

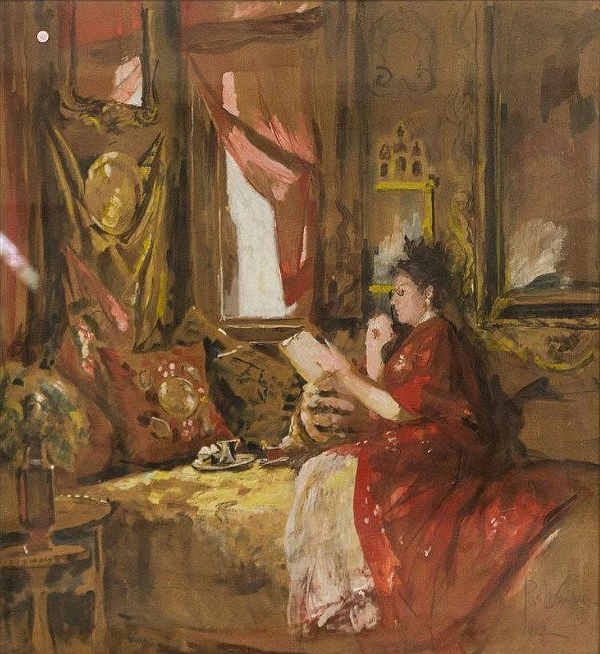
An Elegant Woman, Reading

Paula Freiin von Waechter-Spittler (7 December 1860, Ulm – 15 October 1944, Schloss Horn, near Ummendorf) was a German painter.

== Life and work ==
Paula von Waechter was descended from a noble family, which included Karl von Waechter-Spittler, a Privy Councilor for the Kingdom of Württemberg. From 1878 to 1889, she studied at the Royal Art School in Stuttgart, with the genre painter, Friedrich von Keller. During the school year of 1884–1885, she spent a few months in Paris, taking classes at the Académie Julian.

For mush of her life, she worked as a free-lance artist, specializing in portraits, still-lifes, and animal paintings; with an emphasis on composition. From 1911 to 1912, she assisted Adolf Hölzel in the ladies' painting classes at the art school, which by then had become a State Academy.

From 1893 until her death, she was a member of the Württembergischer Malerinnenverein (Württemberg Women Painter's Association), serving on the management committee for many years. As a representative of the association, she helped organize a gathering of all the similar organizations in Germany, in Munich (1907), to pursue the goal of men and women being exhibited together, and women being allowed to serve as judges.

Paula von Waechter was also a member of several other related groups; such as the Frauenkunstverband Stuttgart (1915 to 1927) the Württembergischer Kunstverein Stuttgart, and the Freien Vereinigung württembergischer Künstler. In addition, she assisted with the pension fund administered by the Pensionsanstalt für Deutsche Bildende Künstler Weimar.
