= Abraham Hillel =

Hakham Abraham Moshe Hillel
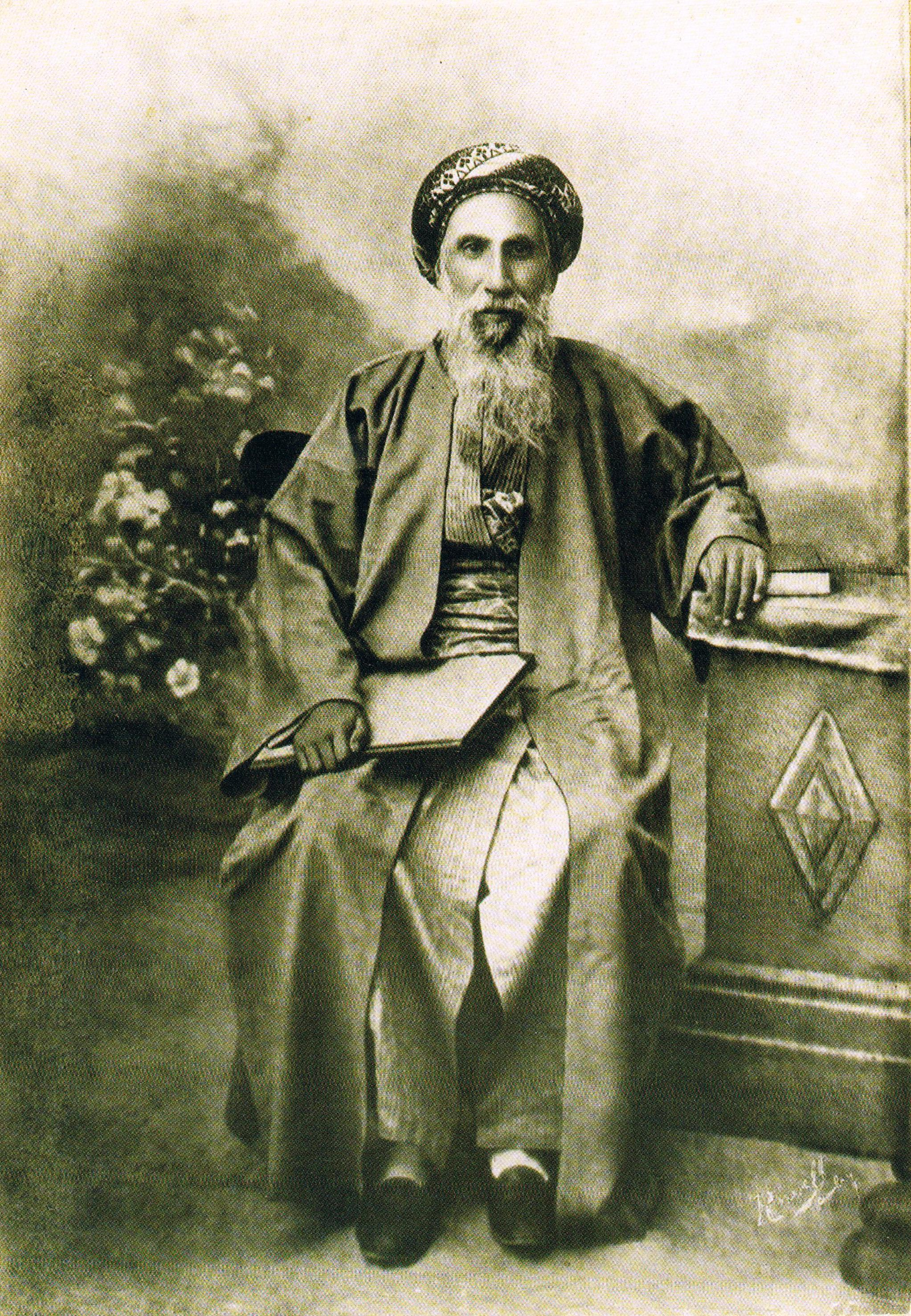
- Title: Chief Rabbi of Baghdad

Religious life
- Religion: Judaism

Abraham Moshe Hillel (1820–1920) served as Chief Rabbi of Baghdad during the years 1884, 1886–1889, and 1911–1915. He was a pupil of Rabbi Abdallah Somekh.
