= Yellen =

Yellen is a surname. Notable people with the surname include:

- Alexander Yellen (born 1981), American cinematographer
- Jack Yellen (1892–1991), American lyricist
- Janet Yellen (born 1946), American economist, former U.S. Treasury Secretary and former Federal Reserve Chair
- Joey Yellen (born 1999), American football player
- Larry Yellen (born 1943), American baseball pitcher
- Linda Yellen (born 1949), American director, producer and writer of film and television
- Sherman Yellen (born 1932), American playwright

== See also ==
- Jelen
- Yellin
