= Jeleń =

Jeleń may refer to the following places:

- Jeleń, Kuyavian-Pomeranian Voivodeship (north-central Poland)
- Jeleń, Łódź Voivodeship (central Poland)
- Jeleń, Lublin Voivodeship (east Poland)
- Jeleń, Lubusz Voivodeship (west Poland)
- Jeleń, Pomeranian Voivodeship (north Poland)
- Jeleń, Silesian Voivodeship, district of Jaworzno (south Poland)
- Jeleń, Działdowo County in Warmian-Masurian Voivodeship (north Poland)
- Jeleń, Mrągowo County in Warmian-Masurian Voivodeship (north Poland)
- Jeleń, Pisz County in Warmian-Masurian Voivodeship (north Poland)
- Jeleń, West Pomeranian Voivodeship (north-west Poland)

== See also ==
- Jelen
