= Solomon Almoli =

Solomon ben Jacob Almoli (before 1485 – after 1542) was a rabbi, physician and Hebrew author of the sixteenth century; lived in the Ottoman Empire, probably in Constantinople. As a physician he seems to have enjoyed quite a reputation, but he is better known as a Hebrew grammarian. He appears to have become a man of wealth in later years, for he published at his own expense numerous grammatical works. Thus in 1529 he published Ibn Ezra's "Yesod Mora," and in 1530 the work "Sefat Yeter" by the same author. To an edition of Ibn Yaḥyah's "Leshon Limmudim" in 1542 he supplied an introductory poem beginning with the words "Reu Sefer." Outside of the frequently reprinted "Pitron Ḥalomot," his other works are extremely rare.

== Works ==
- In 1517 he wrote an introductory ode to Elisha b. Abraham b. Mattathia's Magen David, which was a defense of ḳimḥi's grammatical system against Profiat Duran's criticism.
- Shortly after, he published Halichot Sheva, a grammatical essay upon the sheva (Constantinople, 1519). (Link to .pdf file here.)
- He also wrote Meassef Lechol ha-Maḥanot (The Collector for All Camps) (no date or place), which was, in a way, a prospectus for a Jewish encyclopedia. (The book is extremely rare; the Bodleian possesses only a manuscript copy of a part. Neubauer, "Cat. Bodl. Hebr. MSS." No. 1936, 4.)
- Best known and oftenest printed of all his works is his Pitron Ḥalomot or Mefasher Ḥelmin (Solution of Dreams), a dream-book, in which he explains all passages in the Talmud referring to dreams or their interpretation. It consists of three chapters upon the interpretation of dreams and upon the averting of evil dreams, and was first published in Salonica, about 1516 (link to .pdf file here). It was republished in 1518 in Constantinople, then later in Cracow; was printed in Amsterdam by Manasseh ben Israel (link to .pdf file here), and in 1694 appeared in a Judæo-German translation.
- He also wrote a philosophical treatise upon the nature of the soul and its immortality, entitled Sha'ar ha-Shem he-Ḥadash, Constantinople, 1533.
