= Rudolf Yelin =

German painter (1864–1940)

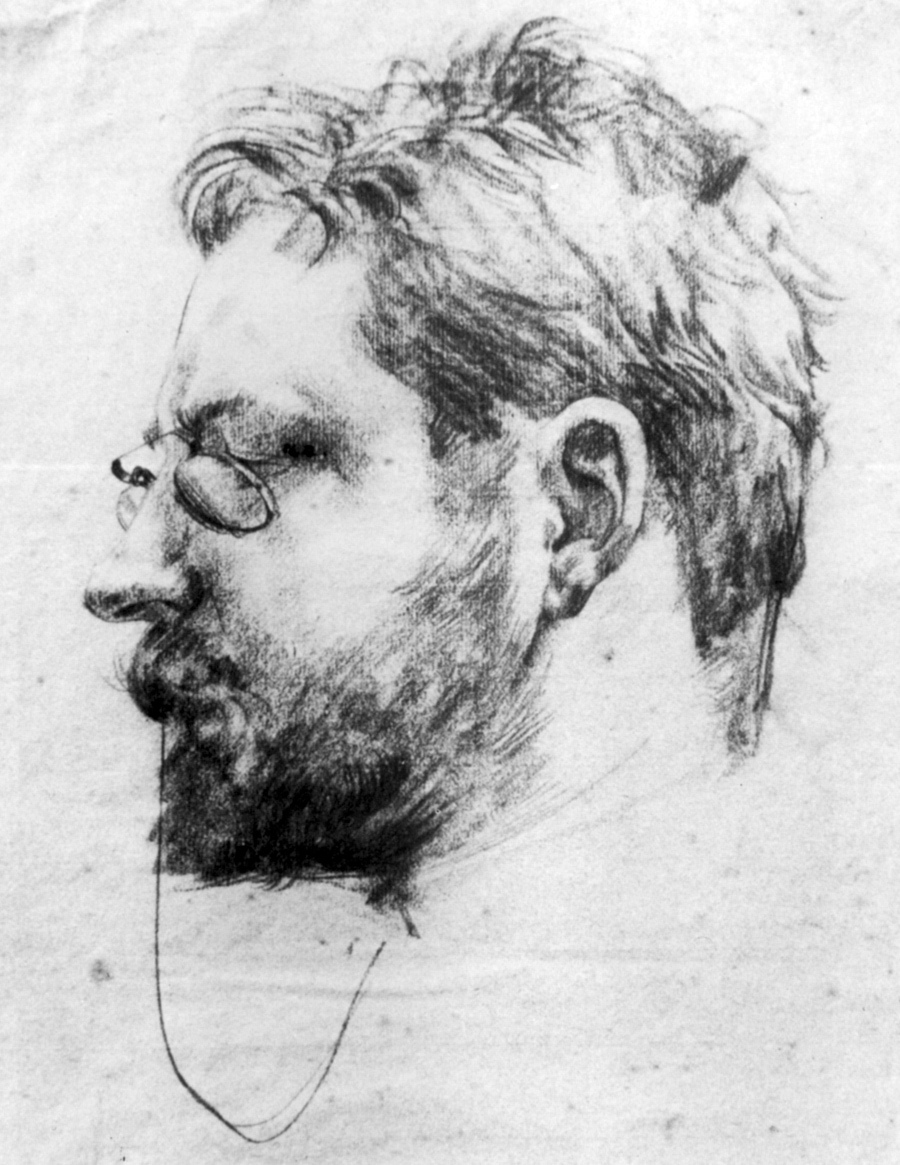
Rudolf Yelin, portrait sketch by Fritz Boehle (C.1890)

Rudolf Yelin (14 August 1864, Reutlingen – 28 December 1940, Stuttgart) was a German painter; best remembered for his religious glass paintings. He is generally referred to as The Elder, to distinguish him from his son of the same name.

== Biography ==
He was born to Rudolph Yelin, a wealthy guano producer, and his wife, Elise née Biermann. Both were pastor's children and wanted their son to pursue a theological career. He attended the seminaries at Schöntal Abbey (1878) and in Bad Urach (1880), then lived at the Tübinger Stift, where he was taught evangelical theology. By the time he was twenty, he had turned away from that career path; going to Munich, where he began to study art. Initially, he took private lessons from Heinz Heim, a genre painter, who was only five years his senior. Later, he studied with Friedrich von Keller, who was also a genre painter.

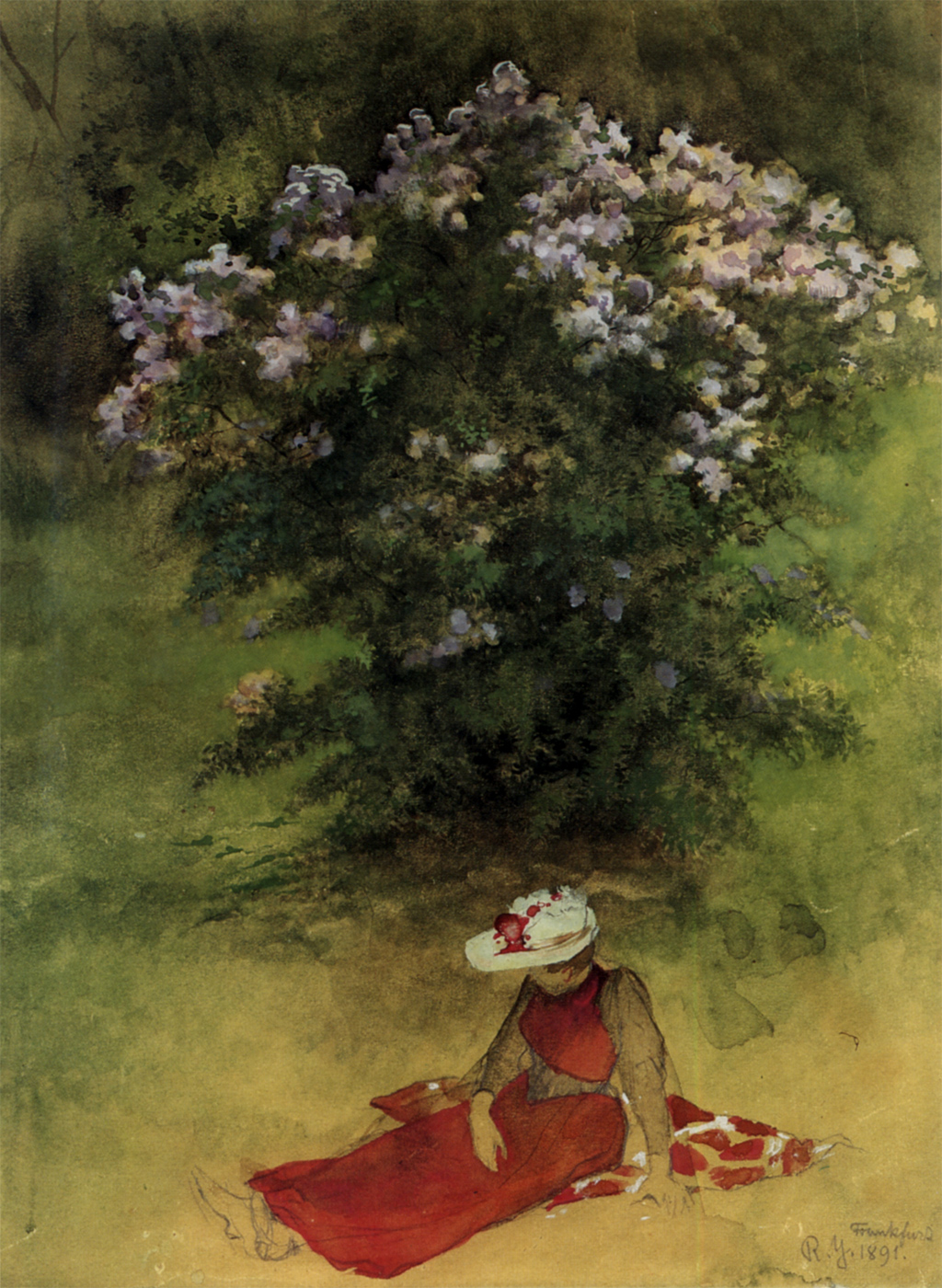
Young Woman Under a Lilac Bush

In 1888, he moved to Stuttgart, where he received his first commissions. These included book illustrations and some decorative work at a monastery. At some point, he became displeased with what he had learned from Keller and returned to Munich, to study with Paul Nauen at the Academy of Fine Arts, and take more private lessons; this time from Heinrich Knirr. In 1890, he received his first major commission, from his hometown, for murals in a cemetery chapel, built by the architect, Heinrich Dolmetsch. Upon completing them, he went to Frankfurt am Main, where he took more lessons, at the Städelsches Kunstinstitut with Frank Kirchbach. He remained unattracted to current trends, such as Impressionism, and was more influenced by the monumental church paintings of Eduard Jakob von Steinle.

In 1892, he was hired as an illustrator for a magazine in Lahr, but also sought church commissions, including one at the Stiftskirche, Stuttgart, which gave a major boost to his career. He opened his own studio in 1894. Shortly after, he first became acquainted with stained glass, when he was commissioned to complete some windows that had been left unfinished by Carl Gottfried Pfannschmidt, a recently deceased artist from Berlin. After 1895, he received orders for glass paintings from all over Germany, cooperating with several workshops. For many years, he also worked as an art teacher. By 1899, he was able to build his own home, with two studios.

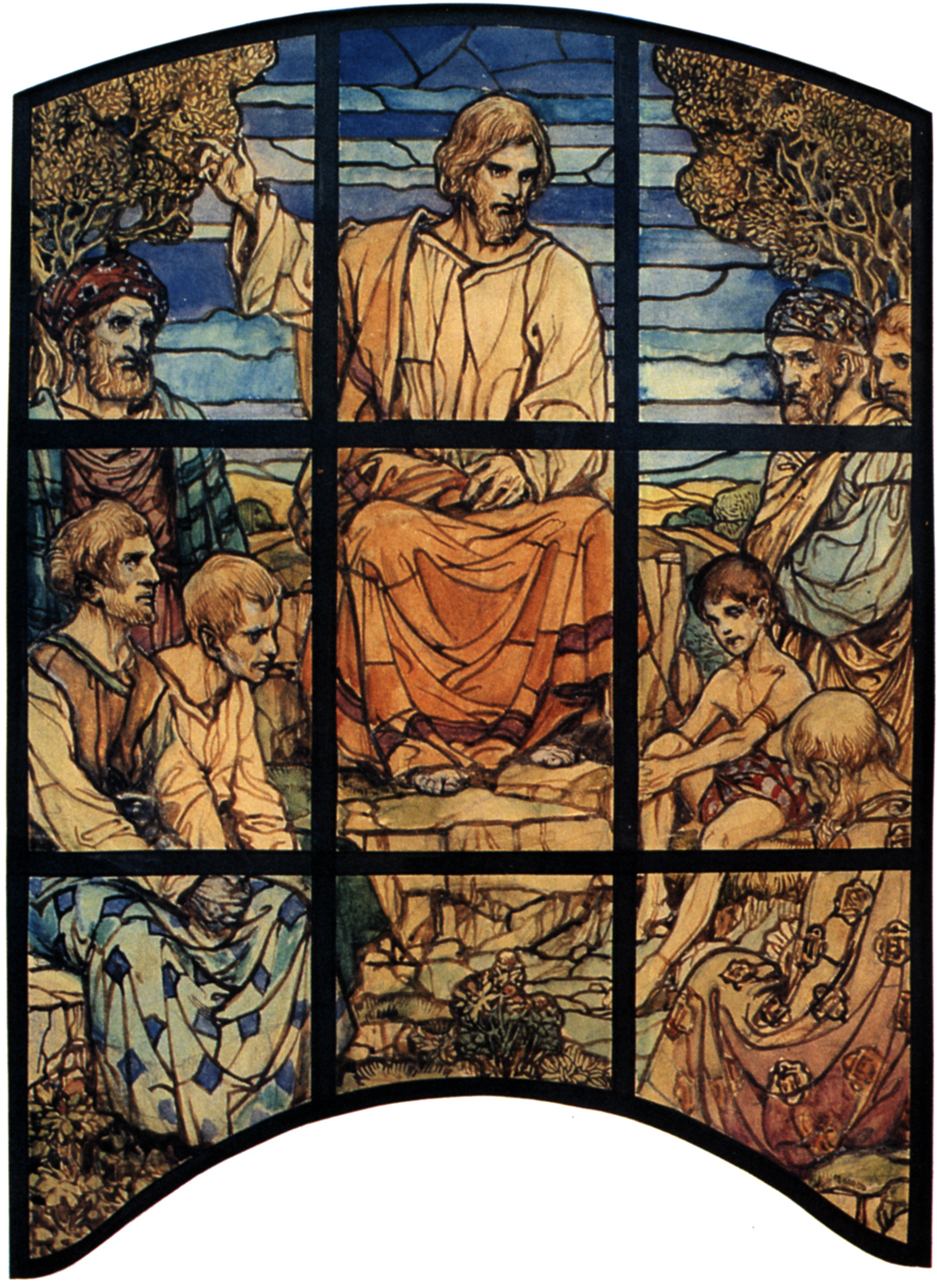
Sermon on the Mount; design for a window at a parish church in Weinheim

During World War I, he was hired by the City of Stuttgart to teach at several gymnasia. After the war, hyperinflation caused the art market to collapse. In 1923, following a disastrous art exhibition at Rosenstein Palace, where prices fell to almost nothing in a few days, he withdrew from the market entirely. By 1926, he had developed a form of phlebitis that prevented him from doing large scale murals. In the 1930s, his eyesight worsened to the point where he had to give up painting altogether.

Both of his sons also became artists. Ernst was a sculptor. His namesake, Rudolf, followed in his footsteps as a glass painter.

== Sources ==
- Bodo Cichy: Rudolf Yelin 1864–1940. Seine Zeit, sein Leben, sein Werk, Verein für christliche Kunst in der evangelischen Kirche Württembergs, Stuttgart 1987.
- H. O. Roecker: "Die Künstlerfamilie Yelin", In: Schwäbisches Heimatbuch 1939. Verlag J. F. Steinkopf, Stuttgart 1939
- Rudolf Yelin (The Younger), "Vita Rudolf Yelin 1864–1940", In: Reutlinger Geschichtsblätter, Neue Folge, Vol. 18 (1979), pp. 117–137
- Rudolf Yelin (The Younger), "Erinnerungen an das großelterliche Haus in Reutlingen", In: Reutlinger Geschichtsblätter, Neue Folge, Vol. 22 (1983), pp. 11–22
