= Jelen =

Jelen or Jeleń ("deer" in several Slavic languages) is a surname and toponym. The name is unrelated to the Senegambian name Jeleen.

== People ==
- Alen Jelen (born 1970), Slovenian theatre and radio director, dramaturgist, actor, journalist
- Alois Jelen (1801–1857), Czech composer
- Antoni Jeleń (born 1964), Polish football player
- Ben Jelen (born 1979), Scottish-born American singer-songwriter
- Eric Jelen (born 1965), German tennis player
- Ireneusz Jeleń (born 1981), Polish football player
- Josef Jelen (born 1914), Czech boxer
- Rudolf Jelen (1876–1938), Czech sports shooter
- Jelen (bumi), 15th-century West African monarch

== Places ==
- Jeleń (inhabited locality), places in Poland
- Jelen, Nebraska, a community in the United States

== Other ==
- Jelen pivo, a Serbian brand of beer
- Jelen (band), Czech folk rock band

== See also ==
- Zafer Yelen, Turkish footballer
- Yellen
- Yellin
