= Ezekiel Judah =

Baghdadi-Jewish businessman (1800–1860)

Ezekiel Judah (Hebrew: יחזקאל יהודה) also known as Yehezkel Yehuda, or Yahuda, or Ezekiel Judah Jacob Sliman (1800–22 April 1860), was a Jewish communal leader, trader of indigo, muslin, and silk, philanthropist, and Talmudist from Baghdad. He migrated to India, where he led the Baghdadi Jewish community of Kolkata and established the city's first synagogues.

== Origins ==
Judah came from a prominent Jewish family in Baghdad, known in English as the Judah family, in Hebrew as the Yehuda family, or originally as the Ma'tuk family.

The Ma’tuk family of Baghdad was descended from Rabbi Ma’tuk, the last Nasi (Prince) of the Jewish community of Anah on the Euphrates. Rabbi Ma’tuk fled to Baghdad with his family in the early 17th century due to threats from a tyrannical governor who had persecuted the community. Rabbi Ma’tuk, as was customary for leaders of prominent Jewish communities in Iraq at the time, had served as the Saraf-Bashi, or treasurer, of the governor. The historian of Baghdad Jewry, Rabbi David Solomon Sassoon, notes that the Ma’tuk family had been established in Anah for centuries.

The family's flight reflected a shift in the axis of Mesopotamian Jews. The historian of Iraqi Jewry, Zvi Yehuda, notes that the conflict between the Ottoman Empire and Persia harmed Anah, and the cessation of caravan trade between Aleppo and Baghdad impoverished the Jewish community, prompting many of the wealthiest Jewish families, including the Ma’tuks, to move to Baghdad. Anah, which had previously been a prosperous Jewish center, fell into sharp decline; a Portuguese traveler in 1663 even observed that the only Jews living there made their livelihoods by producing cloth from camel hair.

Despite this, origins in Anah were seen as a sign of the family's antiquity among Iraqi Jews at the time. This was due to the ancient Iraqi Jewish belief that Anah was the site of Nehardea, which features prominently in the Talmud, including as the first seat of the Exhilarch and his Beth din. The Jews of Anah maintained that they were descended from the Babylonian Exile and had never subsequently returned to Judaea. The descendants of the Ma’tuk family from Anah, known as the Judah family since the late 18th century, continue to uphold this tradition to this day. This belief was corroborated by Christian missionaries in Anah in the 19th century, who reported that "these Jews maintained their forefathers were of the first captivity and had never returned to Palestine."

The family's arrival in Baghdad marked a revival of the city's fortunes. Baghdad, which had ceased to be a Jewish center following its capture by Timur in the 14th century, was re-emerging as a major Jewish center when the family arrived in the early 17th century. According to historian Zvi Yehuda, there are no reports of Jews in Baghdad or its surroundings—including Basra, Hilla, Kifil, Anah, Kurdistan, or even Persia and the Persian Gulf—during the 15th century. The migration of the Ma’tuk family to Baghdad was part of the city's emerging Jewish revival. Historian and Rabbi David Solomon Sassoon noted that the family was one of the oldest Jewish families in Baghdad. The 19th-century German ethnographer H. Peterman corroborated this, writing that the oldest Jewish families of Baghdad, including the Ma’tuk, came from Anah. Historians of Iraqi Jewry recount that the Ma’tuk family, later known as Yehuda or Judah, gained great renown as scholars, rabbis, merchants, and communal leaders in Baghdad during the 18th and 19th centuries. Most notably, the communal leader, poet, and astronomer Sliman Ben David Ma’tuk, also known under the Anglicized name Solomon Ma’tuk, achieved significant prominence.

== Biography ==
Ezekiel Judah, born in 1799 or 1800, is referred to by historians and on monuments in the Calcutta synagogues he erected under several names: Ezekiel Judah, Yehezkel Yehuda or Yahuda, and Ezekiel Judah Jacob Sliman or Sulliman. These variations reflect a transitional period when the emerging Baghdadi Jewish trading diaspora in Asia still used the traditional Jewish naming system, which listed names as the first name of a son, father, and grandfather for religious and communal purposes. However, the diaspora was slowly evolving toward the Western custom of surnames as families began to travel internationally and engage with the British Empire.

However, Iraqi Jewish historians note that the Ma’tuk clan, descended from Rabbi Ma’tuk of Anah, had adopted his name as their clan name or a form of surname by at least the mid-17th century, if not earlier. According to Efrayim Haddad, a chronicler of Iraqi Jewish history, Rabbi Judah Jacob Ma’tuk was the father of Ezekiel Judah. During his lifetime, the family name was changed to the Yehuda or Judah family, a name that was later Anglicized in British India. The name Ezekiel Judah Jacob Sulliman, as it appears on the Neveh Shalom synagogue in Calcutta, combines his first name with that of his father and grandfather, reflecting a traditional naming practice rather than a surname.

According to historian Abraham Ben-Jacob, "amongst the lords of Baghdad at this time, the Judah family (Ma’tuk) occupied a prominent place." Rabbi Judah Jacob married twice and was the father of eight sons and two daughters. His eldest son, Ezekiel Judah, was "the best of his sons" and became the founder of the Judah family in India. He was regarded by his contemporaries as the bearer of the aristocratic name of Baghdadi Jews and was respected as a descendant of the renowned Sliman ben David Matuk of Baghdad. Ezekiel Judah was also a relative of David Sassoon, the chief of the powerful merchants and unofficial leader of the Baghdadi Jewish trading diaspora. Both historian Abraham Ben-Jacob and the Encyclopedia of the Founders and Builders of Israel refer to Ezekiel Judah as a rabbi.

Ezekiel Judah married twice. His first wife was Rachel Haim, the daughter of Rabbi Moshe Haim, who renewed Torah scholarship in Baghdad. Rabbi Moshe Haim was the father-in-law of both David Sassoon and Ezekiel Judah, creating a family bond between the Judahs and the Sassoons. Judah's second wife was Khatoon Gubbay, the daughter of Rabbi Aaron Saleh Gubbay, also known as Hakham (a title used among Mizrahi Jews at the time), who was the Av Beth Din, or deputy head of the supreme Jewish religious court of Baghdad.

The Encyclopaedia of the Founders and Builders of Israel, compiled and published by David Tidhar, notes that Ezekiel Judah was a great Torah scholar who held a yeshiva and educated the poor. One of his students was the renowned Eliyahu Mani, who later became the Rabbi of Hebron. Accounts vary regarding the exact year Ezekiel Judah established his family permanently in Calcutta. While his first arrival in the city is recorded as 1820, Rabbi Ezekiel N. Musleah, the last Rabbi of the Jewish community of Calcutta, indicates that he moved definitively to Bengal in 1838. Ezekiel Judah and members of the Judah family migrated to India amidst the persecution of Jews and the misrule of Dawud Pasha of Baghdad.

Iraqi Jewish historian Abraham Ben-Jacob states that David Sassoon's flight from Baghdad prompted his friend Ezekiel Judah to do the same, traveling with his son Sassoon Judah to India. Initially, they settled in Bombay before later migrating to Calcutta. Ezekiel Judah's wife joined him two years later, with their son Nissim making the long journey to India by donkey.

Ezekiel Judah appears to have been a leading trader in indigo, silk, and muslin. As a philanthropist, he established the first synagogue in Calcutta, known as Neveh Shalom in Hebrew, which translates to "Abode of Peace," in 1825. He also co-founded the second synagogue, Beth-El, in 1856 with David Joseph Ezra.

Ezekiel Judah and the Judah family are described in the epic travelogue of the Ashkenazi Jewish writer J. J. Benjamin. Describing the community of Calcutta, and using the term then in use among Mizrahi Jews to refer to a rabbi, he wrote, "They are all well educated but have no appointed Chachamim; one of the richest commercial men of the town, Ezekiel Jehuda Jacob Sliman, a very enlightened man and an excellent Talmudist, performs the duties of the Chacham." J. J. Benjamin also noted during his visit to Singapore that the elders of the small community there were the sons of Ezekiel Judah.

Ezekiel Judah's enlightened views are evident in his attitude towards the Bene Israel, whom many other Baghdadi Jews sought to separate from and exclude from their synagogues due to their darker skin and Indian origin. In 1843, Ezekiel Judah wrote to the Rabbis of Baghdad concerning the Bene Israel. He stated, "They give birth to sons and circumcise them as we do; they teach them Talmud-Torah with our children. They are exactly as we are, without any difference, and we always refer to them as the Sefer Torah in accordance with the custom of the Jewish people. May we give them our daughters and may we take their daughters?" No record of the Rabbis' response to Ezekiel Judah survives.

In Calcutta, as in Bombay, Ezekiel Judah, like his relative David Sassoon, sought to align the Baghdadi Jewish community with the British and to publicly support the colonial power. He eventually became a naturalized British subject.

Ezekiel Judah died on April 22, 1860, in Calcutta, having not reached his sixty-first year. He is buried in Calcutta. For a year after his death, his sons invited Rabbis from Baghdad, Jerusalem, and Syria, as well as the poor Jews of Calcutta, to study Torah day and night at his former home.

== Legacy ==
After the death of Ezekiel Judah, two branches of the Judah or Yehuda family developed: a rabbinical branch that settled in Jerusalem, and a mercantile branch that remained in Calcutta and eventually migrated to London after the end of British rule.

Yehuda Family of Jerusalem

One of Ezekiel Judah's sons from his first marriage was described as a leader among the Jewish community in Baghdad. Another son from his first marriage, Rabbi Shlomo Yehezkel Yehuda, migrated from Baghdad to Jerusalem, founding a rabbinical branch of the family known as the Yehuda family of Jerusalem. Rabbi Shlomo Yehezkel Yehuda was bequeathed by his father a share in houses in Calcutta worth £25,000, allowing him to live a life of great wealth and respectability. He used the income from these properties to set aside a considerable sum for philanthropy. His migration to Jerusalem was described by his descendant David Yellin.

"In the year 5616 (1856) the outstanding and pious Rabbi Shlomo Yehezkel departed from the city of Baghdad in Babylonia, together with his family, in order to dwell in our city. He travelled overland for forty days on camelback, paying not only for hiring the camels themselves but also an additional sum of 25 gold keiri (about 140 francs) to the caravan master for each Shabbat, so that the entire caravan would rest. He was a man who ‘dwelled in tents and studied Torah.’"

Upon arriving in Jerusalem, Rabbi Shlomo Yehezkel Yehuda set aside one room of his home for ten students to study Torah throughout the day, often studying with them and establishing a scholarship fund for their welfare. Thanks to his father Ezekiel Judah's fortune, Rabbi Shlomo Yehezkel Yehuda played an important role in building the Sephardic Jewish community and rabbinical infrastructure in Jerusalem. In 1858, he established the yeshiva Knesset Yehezkel, named in honor of his father, and maintained it with the large fortune he inherited from his father in Calcutta. After Rabbi Shlomo Yehezkel Yehuda's death, the yeshiva was merged with the Hesed El yeshiva, which was founded in 1860.

Ezekiel Judah's grandson and the son of Rabbi Shlomo Yehezkel Yehuda was Rabbi Faraj Haim Yehuda, born in 1846 in Baghdad. Rabbi Faraj Haim Yehuda was a prominent builder of the Sephardi community in Jerusalem in the late 19th century. He was one of the founders of the Shimon HaTzaddik quarter, a Jerusalem neighborhood established in 1875 by the Eidah Sephardit Committee. In 1882, Rabbi Faraj Haim Yehuda traveled to India to seek funds from wealthy relatives and the Baghdadi Jewish community there for the Shimon HaTzaddik synagogue, visiting Bombay. Upon his return in 1885, he founded the Adat HaBavlim association for Iraqi Jews in Jerusalem with his brother Rabbi Binyamin Yehuda. A noted scholar, Rabbi Faraj Haim Yehuda's book VaTitpallel Hanna, printed in 1889 in Jerusalem, contains prayers, ethics, and laws. He departed for India again in 1893 and died on his return to Jerusalem in his native city of Baghdad.

During his lifetime, Rabbi Shlomo Yehezkel Yehuda developed close relationships with Ashkenazi scholars. Shortly after his arrival in 1854, he shocked the deeply conservative religious society of Jerusalem by marrying his daughter Serah to Yehoshua Yellin, an Ashkenazi Jew and the son of Polish immigrants. The marriage took place about four months after Yehoshua Yellin's Bar Mitzvah. Marriages between Sephardic and Ashkenazi Jews were extremely rare at the time. The Yehuda and Yellin families later joined forces to establish the first modern Jewish agricultural colony in Palestine at Motza. Members of the Yellin family lived in Motza, which is now one of the most sought-after locations on the approach to Jerusalem. The family at one point aspired to settle Yemenite Jewish immigrants in Motza but ultimately failed. In 1860, David Tavya Yellin, Yehoshua Yellin's father, and his father-in-law, Rabbi Shlomo Yehezkel Yehuda, purchased the land at Motza from the Arabs of Qalunya. The historic Yellin family house, built by Yehoshua Yellin, became the family's primary residence in 1890.

David Yellin, the son of Yehoshua Yellin and Serah Yellin, became a central figure in the revival of the modern Hebrew language and a Hebrew poet. He founded the Hebrew Language Committee in 1890, which served as the basis for the modern Academy of the Hebrew Language. Yellin also taught at the Hebrew University of Jerusalem and was a Zionist politician in both Ottoman and Mandatory Palestine. From 1903 to 1912, he served as a member of the Jerusalem Municipal Council, and from 1905 to 1920, he was the President of the Jewish National Council and deputy mayor of Jerusalem. The Yellins, as descendants of Ezekiel Judah, were regarded by their contemporaries as scions of the Sassoon family.

The Yehuda family of Jerusalem continued to actively trade with the Judah family in Calcutta, their wealthy relatives in India, throughout the 19th century. Their trade included Indian products such as tea and indigo. The son of Rabbi Shlomo Yehezkel Yehuda grew close to the Chabad movement in Jerusalem and was known as the Hassid. He received support from his wealthy relatives in India to repair the second floor of the Chabad synagogue in the Old City. The Chabad synagogue, known as Tzemach Tzedek, was originally built in 1858 with support from David Sassoon. The second story and a yeshiva were added in 1879 with the support of Elias Sassoon.

According to the Encyclopaedia of the Founders and Builders of Israel, Rabbi Binyamin Yehuda, the son of Rabbi Shlomo Yehezkel Yehuda, died after a collapse in his capital, which meant he and his brothers were no longer able to distribute alms to the poor as was his custom. "Out of grief, he fell asleep from which he did not arise." His sons included the biblical scholar Abraham Shalom Yahuda.

Judah Family of Calcutta

The mercantile branch of the family remained in India and was known as the Yehuda family. Subsequently, when the name was anglicized during British rule, it became the Judah family of Calcutta. According to Ezra Yehzkel-Shaked, historian of the Baghdadi Jewish trading diaspora, one of Ezekiel Judah's sons from his second marriage, Yosef Yehuda, who remained in India, was described as the "king of the Calcutta opium exchange" and the owner of a "famed sailing vessel" that made regular voyages from India to Macao and other destinations in China.

Calcutta Synagogues

In terms of Ezekiel Judah's physical legacy, the Calcutta synagogues of Neveh Shalom and Beth El remain standing and are maintained in the city, where the Jewish community has dwindled to fewer than twenty people. Despite this, they are regularly visited by tourists and descendants of the Baghdadi Jewish community and are considered a unique part of the city's heritage. Given the near-complete destruction of Jewish heritage sites in Syria and Iraq, Ben Judah has noted that these are among "the last of our synagogues" built in the traditional Baghdadi style.

Descendants

Ezekiel Judah's descendants include Abraham Yahuda (1877–1951) from the Jerusalem branch, and Tim Judah and his son Ben Judah from the Calcutta branch.
