= Alois Jelen =

Czech composer (1801–1857)

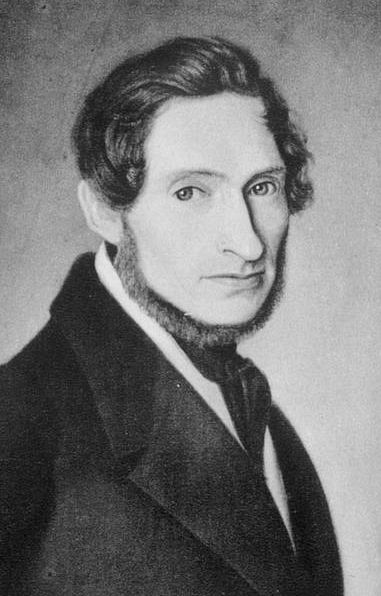
Alois Jelen; portrait by Jozef Božetech Klemens

Alois Jelen (11 May 1801 – 15 October 1857) was a Czech composer and archivist. He was a Czech nationalist.

== Biography ==
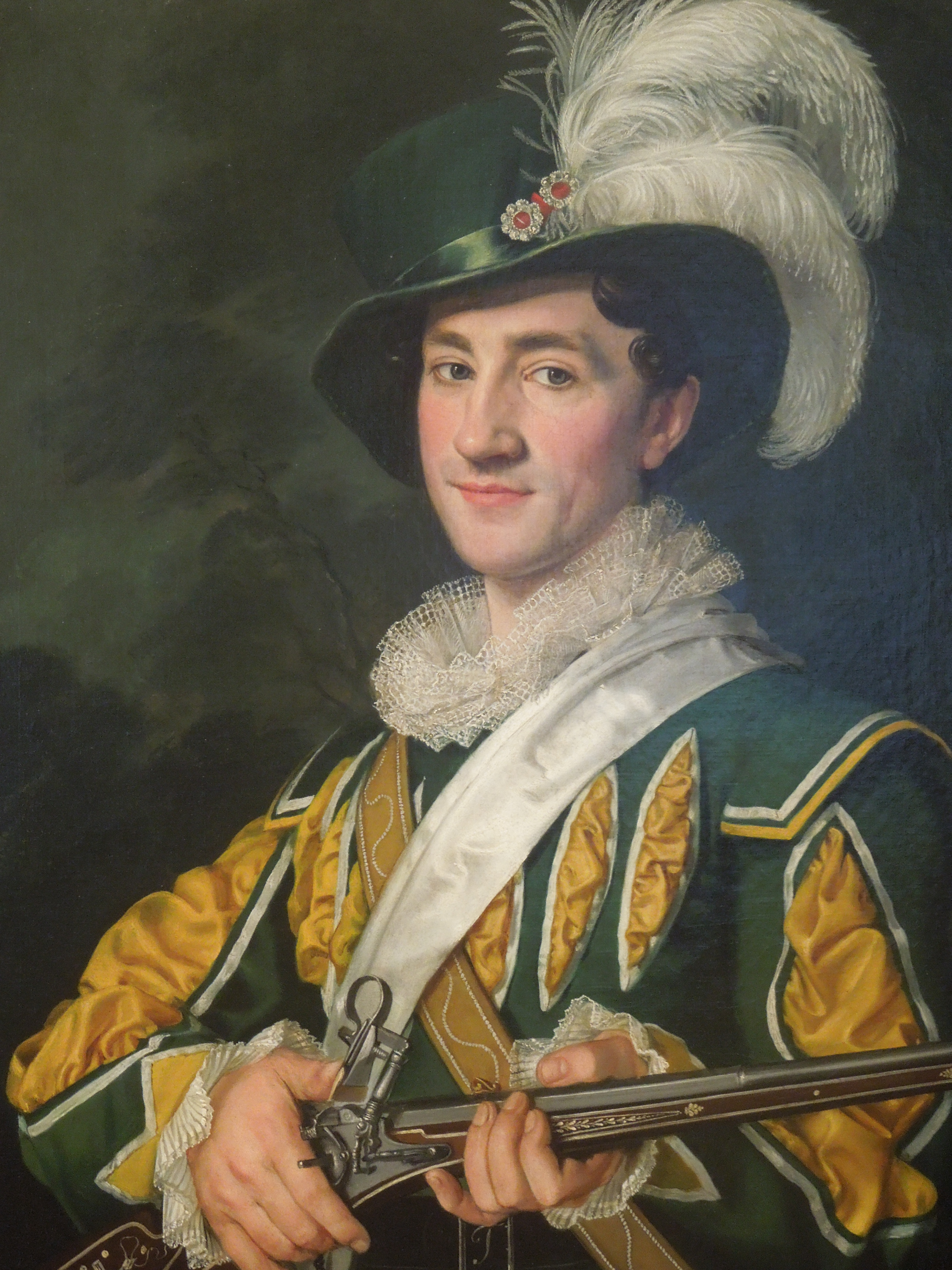
Jelen in the role of "Max", from the opera Der Freischütz. Portrait by Antonín Machek

Jelen was born on 11 May 1801 in Světlá nad Sázavou, Bohemia. He displayed musical talent at an early age, so his father, a school teacher, sent him to Prague for his primary education. His first musical lessons were provided by the composer, Vincenc Mašek, at St. Nicholas Church, where Jelen worked as a singer, from the age of nine. He was, however, orphaned at the age of twelve, so he was left to rely on his own personal resources and whatever patronage he could obtain. He later found a position as a tenor in the choir at the Church of Our Lady before Týn.

After completing his education, in 1824, he took a position as a civil servant with the Kingdom of Bohemia, where he was assigned to the archives and became an expert in diplomatics. As a musician, he composed solo choral songs, both sacred and secular, and worked evenings as an opera singer.

In 1840, he established the choir at the Žofínská (Sophien) Akademie and served as its choirmaster for four years. It soon became a major contributor to the promotion of Czech culture. After leaving the Akademie he worked as a private music teacher and music manager, at various churches and associations; notably at the Měšťanská beseda, a nationalist organization promoting the Czech language. His best known composition comes from this period; "Zasviť mi ty slunko zlaté" (Light up the Golden Sun for Me), set to words by Karel Drahotín Villani, a Czech nobleman.

He became heavily involved in the Czech National Revival, and was active during the Revolutions of 1848. That same year, he stood as a candidate in the Cisleithanian legislative election and was elected to the Imperial Diet, representing the Vlašim constituency. In 1849, he was appointed Director of the archives at the Ministry of the Interior, and moved to Vienna with his family. He would, however, continue to be a regular visitor to Prague.

During one of those trips, he died suddenly in Prague on 15 October 1857 and was buried in what is today the Prague 20 district. In 1887, his remains were transferred to Prague-East District and interred with his daughter-in-law's family (Chourový).

A street near his birthplace is named after him.
