= Karolewo internment camp =

Nazi concentration camp in Karolewo, German occupied Poland

- Concentration camp
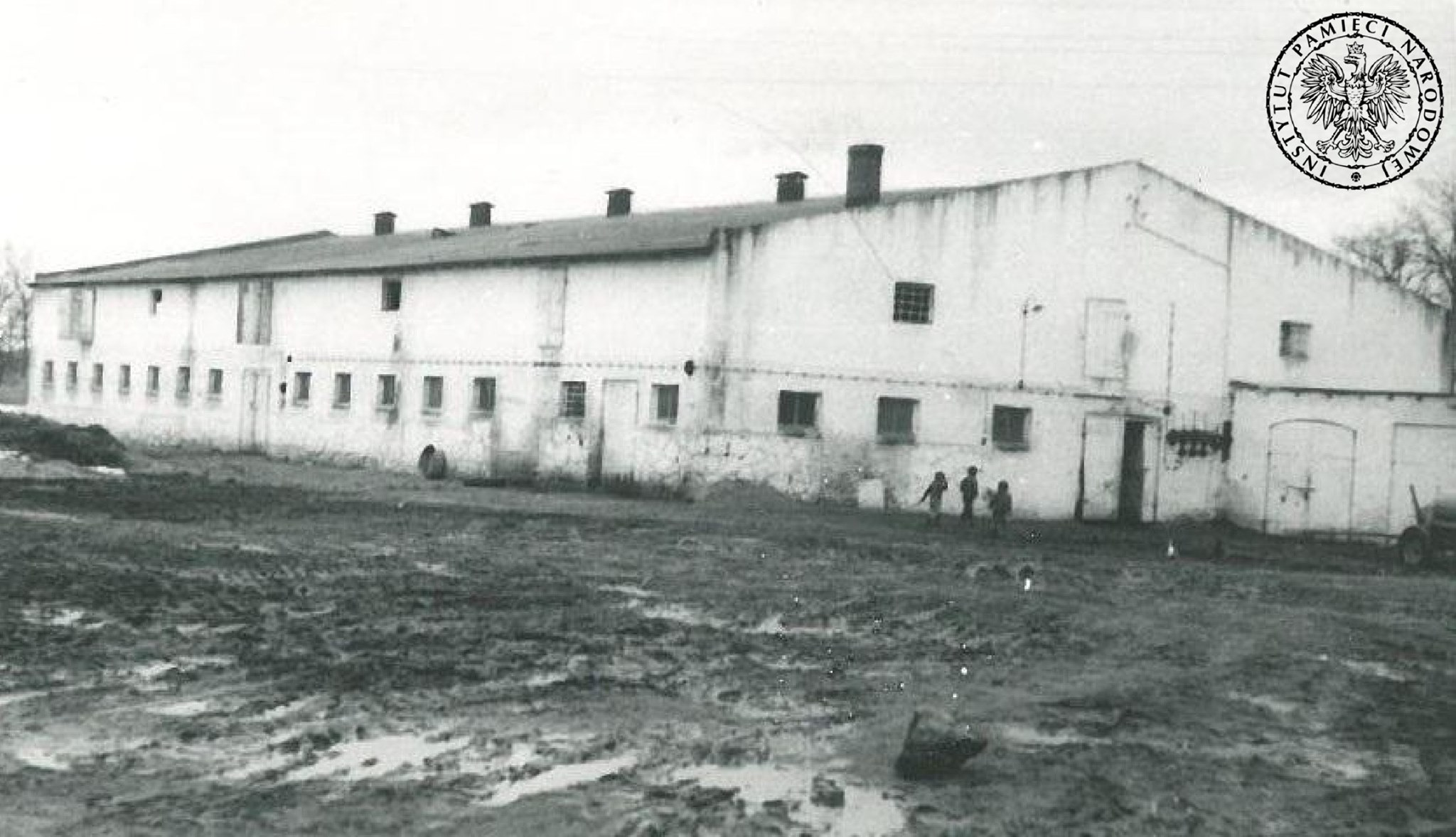
- Coordinates: 53°21′N 17°36′E
- Location: Karlshof (Karolewo), German occupied Poland
- Operated by: Nazi Germany
- Commandant: Herbert Ringel
- Operational: September 1939–December 1939
- Inmates: Polish people
- Killed: at least 1,781

Karolewo internment camp (German: Internierungslager Karlshof) was a makeshift concentration camp for residents of Krajna, established by the German Volksdeutscher Selbstschutz on the estate of Karlshof (now Karolewo) near Vandsburg (now Więcbork). It operated from mid-September to mid-December 1939.

The internment camp in Karolewo held residents of modern Sępólno County and neighboring counties, arrested in the first months of the German occupation as part of the so-called Intelligenzaktion Pommern. In the camp, they were starved, forced into exhausting labor, and subjected to inhumane treatment. The Internierungslager Karlshof was primarily created for the clandestine liquidation of prisoners – most of the detained Poles were executed in nearby forests. Post-war exhumations uncovered the remains of 1,781 people murdered in the camp in the autumn of 1939. Some sources suggest the number of victims may have reached several thousand. The Karolewo camp is considered one of the largest sites of execution of the Polish population in Pomerelia during World War II. It is also sometimes referred to as a "destruction camp".

== Beginning of German occupation ==
Sępólno Krajeńskie and surrounding areas were captured by Wehrmacht units on 1 September 1939. German police, state, and party authorities quickly established themselves in Sępólno County. Regency counselor Marbach from Piła was appointed as the provisional district administrator for the Sępólno-Wyrzysk-Tuchola counties, based in Sępólno. The position of provisional mayor of Sępólno was taken by a local Volksdeutsch, Otto Belau. Marbach's tenure in Sępólno was brief, as by the end of the first week of September 1939, Dr. Ackmann from Złotów assumed the role of Landrat of Sępólno County. He simultaneously became the head of the county's Nazi Party structures (kreisleiter). However, Gauleiter Albert Forster of Gdańsk soon reshuffled municipal and county authorities during his first visit to Sępólno on 8 November 1939. Wilhelm Balnus, previously the mayor of Nowy Dwór Gdański, was appointed Landrat and kreisleiter, while Erich Dorow from Gdańsk became mayor of Sępólno and head of the local Nazi Party structures (ortsgruppenleiter). Erich Goede served as the occupation mayor of Więcbork. On 25 October 1939, military administration was officially abolished in the occupied territories, and Sępólno, along with the entire county, was annexed to the Reich as part of the Bydgoszcz District in the Reichsgau Danzig-West Prussia.

Sępólno County was heavily populated by the German-origin population. German nationality was declared by 40.6% of its residents, with some villages exceeding 80% German inhabitants. They also resided in large numbers in the county's major towns – Sępólno, Więcbork, and Kamień Krajeński. (Note: In Sępólno, 50% of the inhabitants declared German nationality (Bojarska (1965, p. 124)).) Many local Volksdeutsche actively participated in establishing occupation order. On 6 September 1939, Landrat Marbach established the so-called "Homeland Defense" (German: Heimwehr), led by Werner Sorgatz from Kamień Krajeński. By late September, its members were incorporated into the Selbstschutz, a paramilitary police formation composed of Germans who were citizens of pre-war Poland. Organizationally, the Sępólno Selbstschutz structures were subordinated to the IV Selbstschutz Inspectorate in Chojnice, covering Chojnice County, Sępólno County, and Tuchola County, led by SS-Standartenführer Heinrich Mocek. The Selbstschutz units in Sępólno and Tuchola counties shared a single county commander (kreisführer). This was SS-Standartenführer Wilhelm Richardt, a pre-war member of Berlin's SS-Standarte 42, dispatched to Sępólno from Einsatzgruppe IV. This unusual organizational arrangement likely stemmed from the low German population in Tuchola County (only 7.7% of residents). Ernest Karl Wolter served as the Selbstschutz commander in Więcbork.

Mass arrests in Sępólno County began in the first days of the occupation. Guidelines from the German Oberkommando des Heeres mandated the temporary internment of all Poles and Jews aged 17 to 45 capable of military service. Simultaneously, based on the Special Prosecution Book – Poland prepared pre-war by local Volksdeutsche, Polish teachers, clergy, officials, and all individuals classified as the Polish leadership class were systematically detained. On 5 September 1939, Fritz Hermann, head of the civil administration under the commander of the German 4th Army and an SS-Oberführer, issued written instructions to subordinate provisional Landrats, ordering that "all Catholic priests and all teachers of Polish affiliation be immediately investigated regarding their attitudes, and if they do not inspire trust, be taken to an internment camp". Hermann designated the camp in Drożdzienica near Kamień Krajeński as one such temporary facility. A distinctive feature of German terror policy in Sępólno County was the widespread repression of settlers from central and eastern Poland, persecuted primarily because they had received land from parceled German landed properties under the 1925 agrarian reform. Additionally, during the extermination campaign, local Volksdeutsche seized opportunities to settle neighborly disputes and appropriate the property of repressed Poles, enabled by the Selbstschutz's extensive autonomy and impunity. Often, a mere accusation of being a "fanatical Pole" was sufficient for someone to be arrested and murdered.

Poles arrested by the Selbstschutz or German police were initially held in makeshift detention centers, often public buildings, estate structures, large farms, or even distillery basements. In Sępólno, the court jail and county office were converted into temporary prisons; in Więcbork, the district court building; and in Kamień Krajeński, the St. Anne care facility. These makeshift jails quickly became overcrowded. Consequently, most prisoners from the Kamień Krajeński facility were deported to concentration camps in Germany, including many Catholic clergy. Meanwhile, Poles and Jews detained in Sępólno and Więcbork were typically transported or marched to internment camps (German: Internierungslager) organized by the Selbstschutz. Two such camps operated in Sępólno County – one in Karolewo near Więcbork and another in Radzim near Kamień Krajeński. (Note: The internment camp in Radzim also had a small subcamp, established on the grounds of the Komierowo estate (Jastrzębski (1974, p. 123)).)

== Prisoners and camp staff in Karolewo ==
Karolewo is a small village approximately 10 kilometers from Więcbork. In autumn 1939, the Selbstschutz established an internment camp (German: Internierungslager Karlshof) on the estate owned by Wacław Łuczyński. The site was likely chosen for its isolated location, which allowed the crimes committed there to remain secret. The manor lay off the road from Więcbork to Sośno, separated from the village of Jastrzębiec, less than 1.5 kilometers away, by dense forest. The estate buildings could also serve as quarters for the staff and prisoner accommodations.

The Internierungslager Karlshof operated roughly from 18 September to mid-December 1939. Its creation was likely instigated by Hans-Jürgen von Wilckens, a landowner from Sypniewo, an active member of the German minority, and an SS affiliate. The estate's adaptation for camp use was overseen by the estate manager, Otto Karl Bonin. The camp staff resided in the rooms of the 19th-century palace, while prisoners were held in the palace basements and estate outbuildings (pigsties, warehouses, cowsheds, stables). The camp commandant was Herbert Ringel, a saddler by trade, known in Więcbork as an alcoholic and drifter. His deputy was Karl Marquardt, also a Więcbork resident and a postman by profession. The camp guard consisted solely of local Germans, Selbstschutz members. Identified staff members included Willy Bankert, Arnold Bartsch, Otto Damms, Max Willi Ehrit, Werner Foedisch, Hans Genske, Julian Goede, Erhard Kietzer, Heinz Neubauer, Otto Rux, Otto Schulz, as well as Janke, Molting, Reihnold, and the Kohn brothers.

The camp primarily held Poles arrested and brought for liquidation under the Intelligenzaktion. A small number of Jews were also detained. Prisoners typically came from various towns in Sępólno County, as well as neighboring Bydgoszcz County, Wyrzysk County, Chojnice County, Tuchola County, and Kościerzyna County. Additionally, according to one witness, a group of prisoners from Łódź Voivodeship was also brought to the camp. Professor Włodzimierz Jastrzębski categorized the prisoners of the Karolewo camp, like those in the nearby Radzim camp, into four groups:

- Representatives of the "Polish leadership class" – teachers, Catholic clergy, officials, lawyers, political and social activists, members of organizations promoting Polish identity, merchants, craftsmen, landed gentry, etc.;
- Uniformed service personnel – police, border guards, railway workers, postal workers, and soldiers returning from the September Campaign fronts;
- Polish farmers, including many settlers from eastern and central Poland;
- Individuals denounced by local Germans due to neighborly disputes or misunderstandings.

At any given time, the camp held between 100 and 300 internees. Occasionally, the number rose to 600. The turnover of prisoners was high, as collective or individual executions occurred daily in and around the camp, with new prisoners continually brought in to replace the murdered.

== Extermination campaign in Karolewo and surrounding forests ==
Until late September 1939, systematic extermination of prisoners was not conducted in the Karolewo and Radzim internment camps. However, both camps had harsh living conditions, and prisoners were forced into heavy agricultural labor. This changed dramatically in October, when mass executions began in nearly all Pomeranian internment camps, effectively transforming them into extermination centers. The scale and brutality of the crimes in Karolewo and Radzim, along with the number of prisoners processed, make them – alongside barracks in Bydgoszcz and Tczew, and Fort VII in Toruń – the most notorious transitional camps established by Germans in occupied Pomerania. They also became the primary extermination sites for the Polish population in Sępólno County. Karolewo, in particular, is recognized as one of the main execution sites across Pomerania. Consequently, Radzim and Karolewo are often termed "destruction camps".

Detained Poles were interned in Karolewo without legal basis. Charges – usually fabricated – were only presented during interrogations conducted in the palace. (Note: Alongside members of Selbstschutz, interrogations were sometimes conducted by SS officers sent from Gdańsk (Bojarska (1965, p. 132)).) New arrivals faced brutal torture, often aimed at forcing confessions to anti-German offenses, such as membership in pre-war Polish organizations. Severe interrogations frequently resulted in the victim's death.

Prisoners were treated inhumanely. The daily ration typically consisted of 100 grams of bread and watery soup. Sometimes, 200-gram bread portions were distributed every 2–3 days, supplemented by a daily quarter-liter of water mixed with grain bran or buttermilk. Sleeping quarters were filthy, unheated basements or outbuildings. During the day, prisoners were forced into exhausting labor, initially clearing war damage on the Karolewo estate, later working fields owned by German farmers or landowners in Borówki, Olszewka, Ostrówek, Radzim, Rogalin, Sypniewo, and Zielonka (e.g., digging potatoes). Often, they were forced into pointless, humiliating tasks, such as spreading manure on fields with bare hands or being harnessed to carts due to a lack of horses.

The camp guards constantly beat and insulted prisoners. Nights were the worst, as drunken Selbstschutz members stormed prisoner quarters, brutally beating defenseless victims. Poles deemed particularly dangerous (German: Schwerverbrecher), held in the palace basements, faced an especially grim fate, with many shot or beaten to death. Camp staff often devised sadistic "games". One survivor testified post-war that he witnessed Deputy Commandant Marquardt and guard Otto Rux beat to death a teenage prisoner named Kwiatkowski, a high school student from Chojnice, by jumping on his stomach, causing severe internal injuries, then throwing him through glass doors onto the palace courtyard, where he soon died. On another occasion, Marquardt, Rux, and Bartsch forced a Jewish merchant, Meierschan, to run around a pond until he collapsed, then beat him to death. Even Commandant Ringel's brother-in-law, Judge Naftyński from Więcbork, was savagely murdered.

Alongside individual murders and brutality, systematic extermination occurred. The forest near Jastrzębiec became a primary execution site, with collective executions of 10 to 20 people occurring almost daily. The largest massacre took place in mid-October 1939, when nearly 100 prisoners were killed in a day-long execution, celebrated by the perpetrators with a drinking bout. Executions also occurred in the palace park and nearby fields. Victims were often brutally killed with blows from sticks, shovels, or cart spokes, with mass graves later revealing bodies with shattered or missing skulls. Executions typically occurred at 4:00 AM, earning the execution squad the nickname Vieruhrkommando ("four o'clock commando"). Polish prisoners were forced to dig mass graves – some up to 100 meters long – and bury their murdered comrades. The victims' belongings and clothing were looted by the perpetrators. According to testimonies of Julian Bas and Franciszek Gondek:

I worked with a group digging ditches and filling graves packed with corpses. There were traces of atrocities. While digging and filling, we encountered severed body parts, evidence that they weren’t just shot but hacked with blunt tools and murdered in the most hideous ways. Roll calls were held in the morning, at noon, and in the evening. A list was prepared, with crosses marking those to be executed that day. This group was separated, while the rest were sent to work. The condemned were stripped to their trousers and shirts. Then the abuse began. They were beaten with steel springs, lead balls sewn into leather, or chains wrapped in barbed wire. Later, small groups were driven to the forest, where ditches about 100 meters long were ready

Hans-Jürgen von Wilckens likely approved the execution lists. Survivors recalled that his visits to the camp always signaled a collective execution the next day. (Note: Wilckens was said to have told his former employee, Feliks Migawa, that "every Pole must go through the camp" (Buława (1974, p. 199)).) County Selbstschutz commander SS-Standartenführer Wilhelm Richardt also demanded mass executions, frequently asking subordinates how many Poles had been shot, emphasizing that no one was interested in maintaining large camps or "feeding Poles there".

In mid-December 1939, the Internierungslager Karlshof was dissolved, with around 190 prisoners remaining. (Note: Local historians state that around 60 prisoners were held in Karolewo at the time of the camp's dissolution (Pietrzyk (2001, p. 27); Buława (1974, p. 202)).) Of these, 170 – residents of Sępólno, Tuchola, Chojnice, and Wyrzysk counties – were released home, though most were later rearrested and deported to Dachau and Sachsenhausen concentration camps. 17 prisoners from other counties were detained in Więcbork prison before being transferred to Stutthof concentration camp.

Karolewo and Radzim were not the only sites in Sępólno County where Poles arrested under Intelligenzaktio" were murdered. Several executions occurred in Sępólno itself. Between late September and October 1939, six Poles were shot near the railway track from Sępólno to Kamień Krajeński. At least 21 others were executed at the Sępólno jail, behind the public school on Wojska Polskiego Street, and at the local sports shooting range.

=== Victims ===
Precisely determining the number of victims at Karolewo is nearly impossible due to the lack of surviving camp records. These may have been destroyed, along with other Selbstschutz archives, in a staged car accident on the road from Bydgoszcz to Gdańsk on 17 November 1939. Protocols from post-war exhumations in the forests around Karolewo have also been lost under unclear circumstances. Barbara Bojarska, Andrzej Gąsiorowski, Włodzimierz Jastrzębski, and Jan Sziling report that exhumations conducted in Karolewo from 11 to 14 June 1946 uncovered the remains of 1,781 people murdered in autumn 1939, with 75 bodies identified. Other sources claim two exhumations occurred – in 1945 (962 bodies) and June 1946 (1,781 bodies).

The forests around Karolewo may still conceal undiscovered remains, as Selbstschutz members buried victims in scattered, unmarked graves across the area, carefully camouflaged with young trees or even a football field to erase evidence. Locals suspected the death toll exceeded exhumation findings but could not estimate it precisely. A 1945 survey by the district court estimated approximately 8,000 victims. Later guides to commemorated sites of struggle and martyrdom cited even higher figures, ranging from 8,000 to 10,000. These estimates, however, are significantly inflated. Józef Buława argued that if the survey and guide figures for Karolewo and Radzim were accurate, nearly 13,000 Sępólno County residents would have been murdered in autumn 1939. Yet, a German census from December 1940 showed the Polish population decreased by about 4,500, leading Buława to estimate a maximum of 4,000 deaths during the Intelligenzaktion. Nonetheless, Sępólno County's losses were among the highest in Pomerania.

Maciej Schulz, head of the Gdańsk branch of the Chief Commission for the Prosecution of Crimes against the Polish Nation, estimated in 2012 that the Karolewo camp claimed 2,643 victims. The Institute of National Remembrance's investigation, concluded in September 2014, determined that "at least 1,781 Poles" were murdered, acknowledging the likelihood of a higher actual toll.

To date, 298 victims have been identified by name. They included residents of Sępólno, Tuchola, Chojnice, Bydgoszcz, Wyrzysk, and Kościerzyna counties, active in interwar political, social, educational, cultural, and religious spheres. Numerous merchants, craftsmen, and farmers – especially settlers from central and eastern Poland (e.g., dozens from Młynki, Runowo, Sośno, Wielowiczek, and Zabartowo) – were also killed. Identified victims include:

- Teachers: Jan Figurski (Runowo), Leonard Dolewski (Sępólno), Longin Łuczywek (Sępólno), Bernard Rosiński (Sypniewo), Zygmunt Mroz (Więcbork), Walerian Affelt (Witunia);
- Clergy: Rev. Sylwester Grabowski (Sypniewo parish priest, Polish Armed Forces colonel);
- Merchants: Teofil Oczkowski (Sypniewo), Franciszek Tomas (Sypniewo), Jan Affelt (Więcbork), Józef Korpal (Więcbork), Kubiak (Więcbork), Meiershan (Więcbork), Onufry Ziarkowski (Więcbork);
- Uniformed service workers: Ignacy Balcerzak (postman, Sitowiec), Walenty Głodowski (railway worker, Dorotowo), Franciszek Tomaszewski (prison guard, Sępólno), Mikołaj Betański (postman, Sypniewo), Edmund Groszewski (railway worker, Sypniewo), Jan Kuchta (border guard, Sypniewo), Szczepan Szymczak (retired policeman, Sypniewo), Stanisław Wilczura (border guard, Sypniewo), Leon Janas (gamekeeper, Świdwie), Franciszek Wojciechowski (railway worker, Więcbork);
- Officials and activists: Wacław Bąkowski (Więcbork commune secretary), Czesław Wojtkowiak (municipal official, Więcbork), Józef Sieracki (village head, Jastrzębiec), Piotr Lindecki (Więcbork mayor);
- Lawyers: Edwin Głuski vel Guski (advocate secretary, Więcbork), Nałtyński vel Naftyński (judge, Więcbork), Wawrzyniec Trapacki (advocate secretary, Więcbork);
- Others: Konrad Kaaz (organist, Sypniewo church), Roman Nowicki (dentist, Więcbork), Andrzej Prądzyński (landowner, Skarpa).

== Commemoration ==
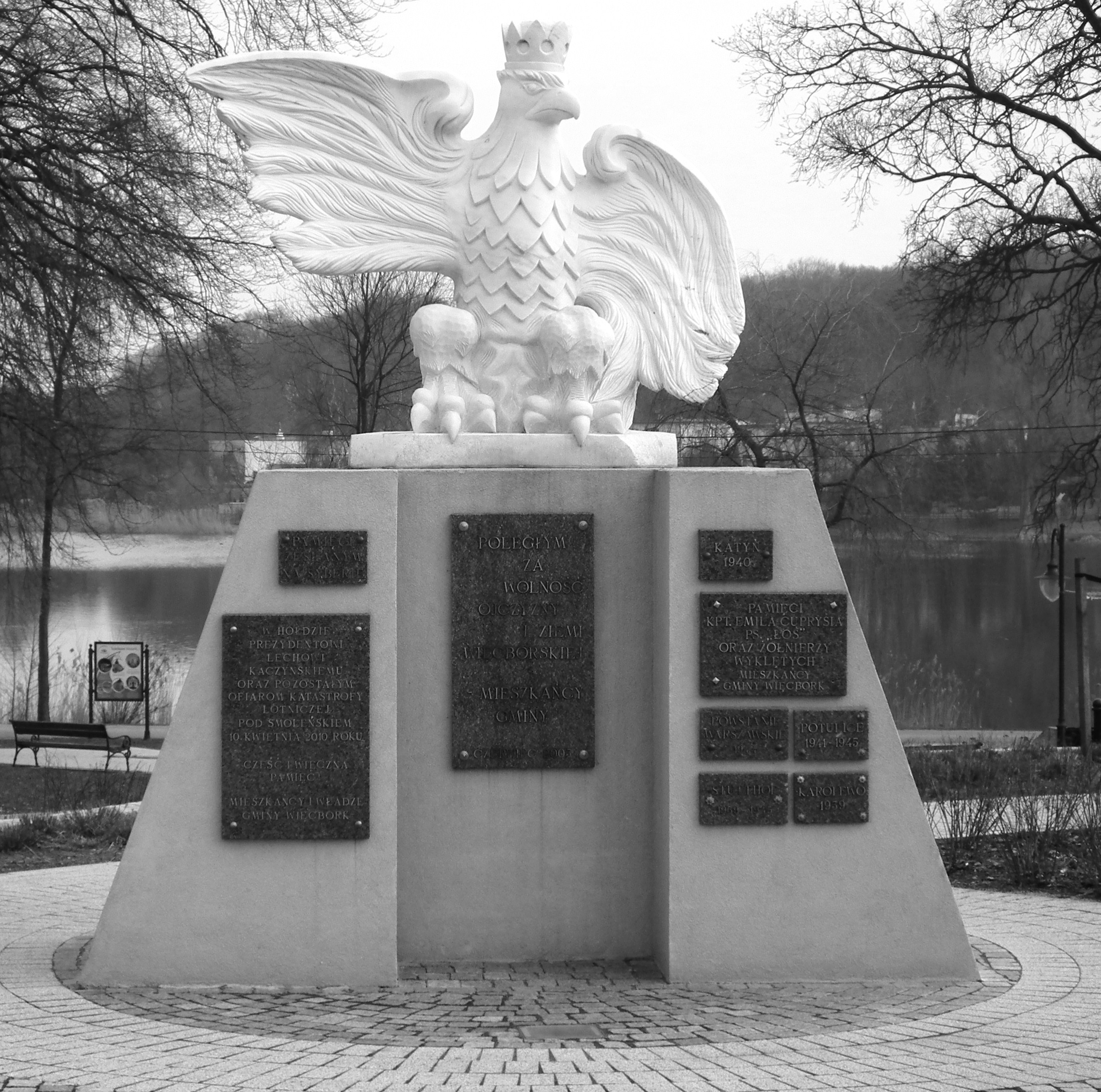
Monument in Więcbork's market square honoring those who died for the homeland, including Karolewo camp victims

In 1947, a cemetery for victims of German terror was established along the road from Karolewo to Jastrzębiec. The remains were solemnly buried in two mass graves, and a memorial chapel-mausoleum was built, housing plaques with the names of identified victims.

In 1952, Jastrzębiec residents erected a memorial boulder near the road from Więcbork to Sośno, inscribed on its pedestal: "Karolewo – 1 km". In 1989, a plaque commemorating the camp's victims was affixed to the administrative building of the former Karolewo estate. It reads:

Here, in the buildings of the Karolewo estate, from 15 September 1939 to 15 December 1939, a Nazi transitional camp existed, holding an average of over 1,000 Poles, including women and children. They were brought from the former Sępólno, Chojnice, Tuchola, Wyrzysk, and Bydgoszcz counties. Beaten and starving, they were taken from here to be shot in nearby forests, especially a deep gravel pit, where, after burying some, others were brought in. After liberation, a cemetery was established at the crime site, where 1,781 exhumed bodies from various locations were buried, and a mausoleum-chapel was built. They took our lives; we leave you our memory!

In 1989, a memorial plaque was also placed on the former district court building in Więcbork, used in 1939 as a makeshift prison from which many detainees were sent to their deaths in Karolewo.

== Accountability of perpetrators ==
The fate of camp commandant Herbert Ringel remains unclear. Włodzimierz Jastrzębski reported that due to his rowdiness and insubordination, he was shot by German gendarmerie in early 1940.

From 1 February to 12 April 1965, a trial of Selbstschutz members from Sępólno and Tuchola was held in Mannheim, primarily addressing the executions at Rudzki Most. SS-Standartenführer Heinrich Mocek, head of the Chojnice Selbstschutz inspectorate, and SS-Standartenführer Wilhelm Richardt, commander of Selbstschutz in Sępólno and Tuchola counties, were found guilty and sentenced to life imprisonment.

== Bibliography ==
- Bojarska, Barbara (1965). "Obozy zniszczenia na terenie powiatu sępoleńskiego w pierwszych miesiącach okupacji hitlerowskiej" [Destruction Camps in Sępólno County in the First Months of Hitler's Occupation]. Przegląd Zachodni (in Polish). 1–2.
- Buława, Józef (1974). "Okupacja hitlerowska w powiecie sępoleńskim w latach 1939–1945" [Hitler's Occupation of Sępólno County in the Years 1939–1945]. In Jastrzębski, Włodzimierz (ed.). Dzieje Sępólna i okolic [The History of Sępólno and Its Surroundings] (in Polish). Bydgoszcz: Kujawsko-Pomorskie Towarzystwo Kulturalne.
- Ciechanowski, Konrad (1988). Stutthof: hitlerowski obóz koncentracyjny [Stutthof: Hitler's Concentration Camp] (in Polish). Warsaw: Interpress. ISBN 83-223-2369-7.
- Jastrzębski, Włodzimierz (1974). Terror i zbrodnia. Eksterminacja ludności polskiej i żydowskiej w rejencji bydgoskiej w latach 1939–1945 [Terror and Crime: Extermination of Polish and Jewish Populations in the Bydgoszcz District in the Years 1939–1945] (in Polish). Warsaw: Interpress.
- Pietrzyk, Edward (2001). Miejsca pamięci narodowej powiatu sępoleńskiego i ich wychowawcza rola w społeczeństwie [National Memory Sites of Sępólno County and Their Educational Role in Society] (in Polish). Sępólno Krajeńskie: "Daniel" Ewa Wierzchucka. ISBN 83-915830-1-5.
