= Korea, Więcbork =

District of the town of Więcbork, Poland

Korea
- Neighbourhood of Więcbork
- Location within Poland Location within Kuyavian-Pomeranian Voivodeship
- Coordinates: 53.364593°N 17.492101°E
- Country: Poland
- Voivodeship: Kuyavian-Pomeranian
- County: Sępólno
- Gmina: Więcbork
- Town: Więcbork
- Time zone: UTC+1 (CET)
  - Summer (DST): UTC+2 (CEST)
- Postal code: 89-410
- Vehicle registration: CSE
- SIMC: 0929842

Korea [kɔˈrɛa] is a neighbourhood of Więcbork, Poland, located in the north-western part of the town.
