= Świdwie (disambiguation) =

Świdwie may refer to the following places in Poland:

- Świdwie, a lake in north-western Poland
- Świdwie, Kuyavian-Pomeranian Voivodeship (north-central Poland)
- Świdwie, Gmina Sośno in Kuyavian-Pomeranian Voivodeship (north-central Poland)
