= Chmielniki =

Chmielniki may refer to the following places:

- Chmielniki, Bydgoszcz County in Kuyavian-Pomeranian Voivodeship (north-central Poland)
- Chmielniki, Kuyavian-Pomeranian Voivodeship (north-central Poland)
- Chmielniki, Podlaskie Voivodeship (north-east Poland)
