= Lutówko, Kuyavian-Pomeranian Voivodeship =

Lutówko
- Village
- Location within Poland
- Coordinates: 53°28′N 17°26′E
- Country: Poland
- Voivodeship: Kuyavian-Pomeranian
- County: Sępólno
- Gmina: Sępólno Krajeńskie
- Elevation: 128 m (420 ft)
- Population: 280

Lutówko ([luˈtufkɔ]; German: Klein Lutau) is a village in the administrative district of Gmina Sępólno Krajeńskie, within Sępólno County, Kuyavian-Pomeranian Voivodeship, in north-central Poland.
