= Werski Most =

- Village
- Location within Poland
- Coordinates: 53°24′51″N 17°17′36″E
- Country: Poland
- Voivodeship: Kuyavian-Pomeranian
- County: Sępólno
- Gmina: Więcbork

Werski Most [ˈvɛrski ˈmɔst] is a village in the administrative district of Gmina Więcbork, within Sępólno County, Kuyavian-Pomeranian Voivodeship, in north-central Poland.
