= Zalesie, Sępólno County =

Zalesie
- Village
- Location within Poland
- Coordinates: 53°30′45″N 17°38′36″E
- Country: Poland
- Voivodeship: Kuyavian-Pomeranian
- County: Sępólno
- Gmina: Sępólno Krajeńskie
- Population: 240

Zalesie ([zaˈlɛɕɛ]; German: Salesch) is a village in the administrative district of Gmina Sępólno Krajeńskie, within Sępólno County, Kuyavian-Pomeranian Voivodeship, in north-central Poland.
