= Kawle =

Kawle may refer to:

- Kawle, Poland, a village in Poland
- Kawale Tarf Nate, a village in Mahad taluka, Raigad district of Maharashtra state in India
