= Borzyszkowo =

Borzyszkowo refers to the following places in Poland:

- Borzyszkowo, Kuyavian-Pomeranian Voivodeship
- Borzyszkowo, West Pomeranian Voivodeship
