= Suchorączek =

- Village
- Location within Poland
- Coordinates: 53°22′N 17°32′E
- Country: Poland
- Voivodeship: Kuyavian-Pomeranian
- County: Sępólno
- Gmina: Więcbork

Suchorączek ([suxɔˈrɔnt͡ʂɛk]) is a village in the administrative district of Gmina Więcbork, within Sępólno County, Kuyavian-Pomeranian Voivodeship, in north-central Poland.
