= Dębiny, Sępólno County =

Dębiny
- Village
- Location within Poland
- Coordinates: 53°24′59″N 17°42′3″E
- Country: Poland
- Voivodeship: Kuyavian-Pomeranian
- County: Sępólno
- Gmina: Sośno
- Population (2006): 160
- Area code: (+48) 52
- Vehicle registration: CSE

Dębiny [dɛmˈbinɨ] is a village in the administrative district of Gmina Sośno, within Sępólno County, Kuyavian-Pomeranian Voivodeship, in north-central Poland.
