= Runowo-Młyn =

- Village
- Location within Poland
- Coordinates: 53°19′56″N 17°29′03″E
- Country: Poland
- Voivodeship: Kuyavian-Pomeranian
- County: Sępólno
- Gmina: Więcbork

Runowo-Młyn [ruˈnɔvɔ ˈmwɨn] is a village in the administrative district of Gmina Więcbork, located within Sępólno County, Kuyavian-Pomeranian Voivodeship, inin north-central Poland.
