= Dziedno =

- Village
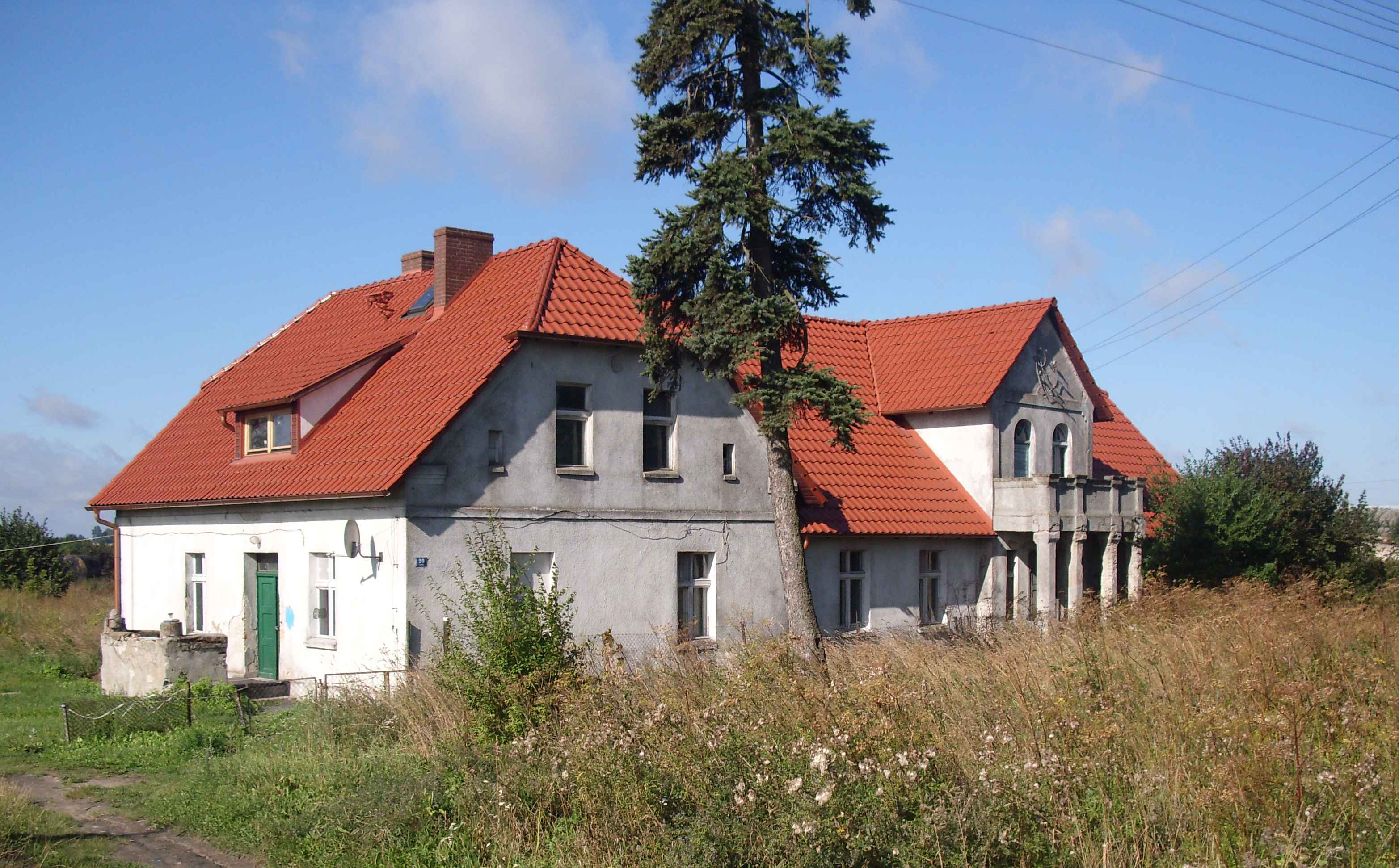
- Old manor house in Dziedno

- Location within Poland
- Coordinates: 53°26′N 17°45′E
- Country: Poland
- Voivodeship: Kuyavian-Pomeranian
- County: Sępólno
- Gmina: Sośno
- Time zone: UTC+1 (CET)
  - Summer (DST): UTC+2 (CEST)
- Area code: (+48) 52
- Vehicle registration: CSE

Dziedno [ˈd͡ʑɛdnɔ] is a village in the administrative district of Gmina Sośno, within Sępólno County, Kuyavian-Pomeranian Voivodeship, in north-central Poland.

== History ==
In 1300 Mikołaj of Rzeczyca (Mikołaj z Rzeczyce) sold Dziedno to Cistercians from Byszewo.

During the German occupation of Poland (World War II), in 1941, the occupiers carried out expulsions of Poles, who were deported to the Potulice concentration camp, while their farms were then handed over to German colonists as part of the Lebensraum policy.
