= Roztoki =

Roztoki may refer to the following places in Poland:

- Roztoki, Lower Silesian Voivodeship (south-west Poland)
- Roztoki, Kuyavian-Pomeranian Voivodeship (north-central Poland)
- Roztoki, Subcarpathian Voivodeship (south-east Poland)
- Roztoki, Lubusz Voivodeship (west Poland)
- Roztoki, West Pomeranian Voivodeship (north-west Poland)
