= Wałdowo, Sępólno County =

Wałdowo
- Village
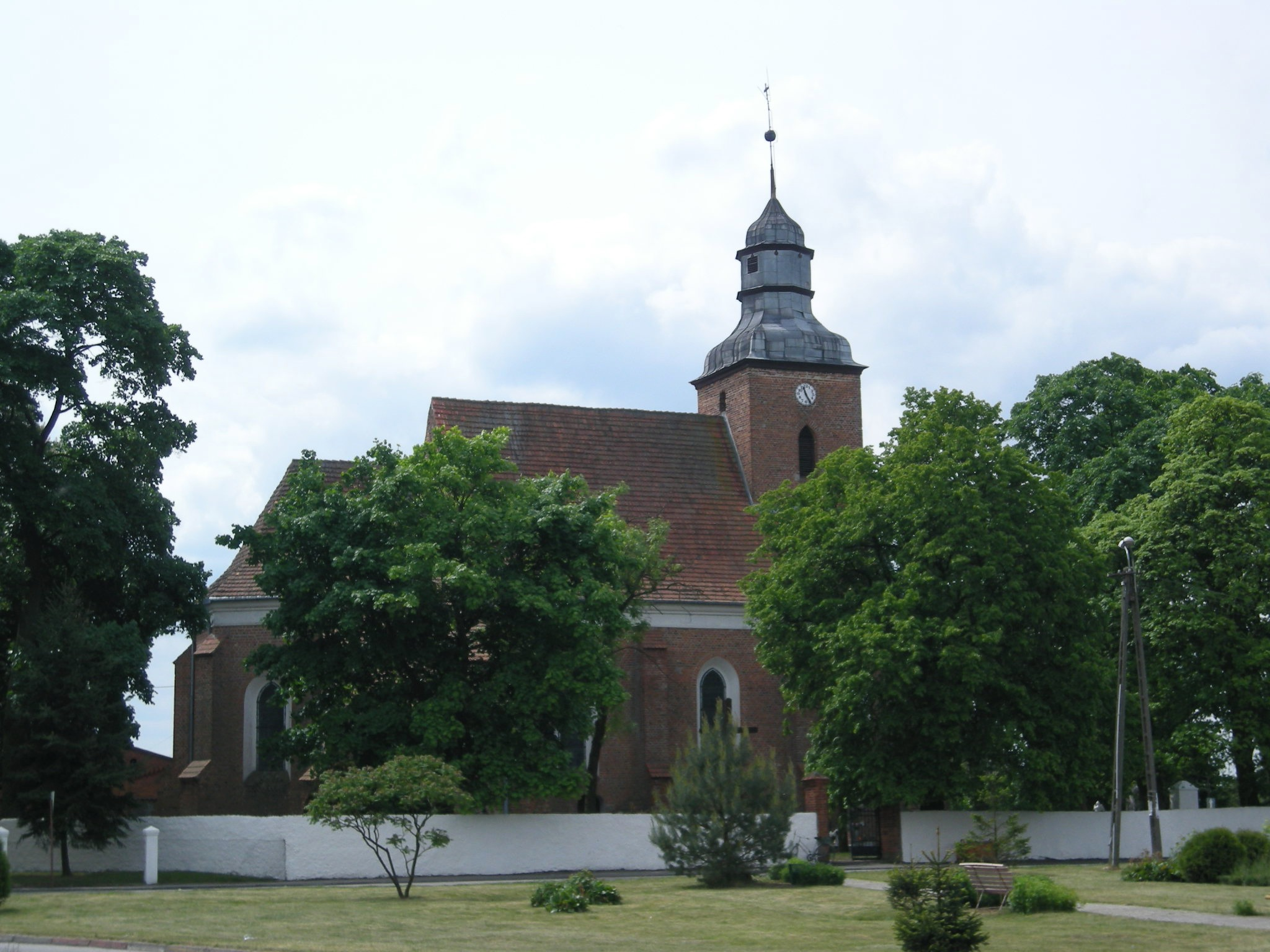
- Church of Saint Matthew

- Location within Poland
- Coordinates: 53°28′32″N 17°41′10″E
- Country: Poland
- Voivodeship: Kuyavian-Pomeranian
- County: Sępólno
- Gmina: Sępólno Krajeńskie

Population
  - Total: 640

Wałdowo ([vau̯ˈdɔvɔ]; German: Waldau) is a village in the administrative district of Gmina Sępólno Krajeńskie, within Sępólno County, Kuyavian-Pomeranian Voivodeship, in north-central Poland.
