= Wymysłowo, Sępólno County =

Wymysłowo
- Village
- Location within Poland
- Coordinates: 53°21′57″N 17°16′48″E
- Country: Poland
- Voivodeship: Kuyavian-Pomeranian
- County: Sępólno
- Gmina: Więcbork
- Population: 90

Wymysłowo [vɨmɨˈswɔvɔ] is a village in the administrative district of Gmina Więcbork, within Sępólno County, Kuyavian-Pomeranian Voivodeship, in north-central Poland.
