= Szynwałd =

Szynwałd may refer to the following places:

- Szynwałd, Grudziądz County in Kuyavian-Pomeranian Voivodeship (north-central Poland)
- Szynwałd, Sępólno County in Kuyavian-Pomeranian Voivodeship (north-central Poland)
- Szynwałd, Lesser Poland Voivodeship (south Poland)
