= Karolewo, Sępólno County =

Karolewo
- Village
- Location within Poland
- Coordinates: 53°21′N 17°36′E
- Country: Poland
- Voivodeship: Kuyavian-Pomeranian
- County: Sępólno
- Gmina: Więcbork

Karolewo [karɔˈlɛvɔ] is a village in the administrative district of Gmina Więcbork, within Sępólno County, Kuyavian-Pomeranian Voivodeship, in north-central Poland.

On 17 September 1939, one of the many camps in Pomerania (Internierungslager Karlshof) was established in Karolewo. It was intended for the extermination of the Polish and Jewish populations from the counties of Sępólno, Tuchola, Bydgoszcz, Wyrzysk, and Chojnice. The camp was dissolved in mid-December 1939. According to various sources, between 4,000 and 10,000 people were murdered there.
