= Włościbórz, Kuyavian-Pomeranian Voivodeship =

Włościbórz
- Village
- Location within Poland
- Coordinates: 53°28′40″N 17°37′48″E
- Country: Poland
- Voivodeship: Kuyavian-Pomeranian
- County: Sępólno
- Gmina: Sępólno Krajeńskie
- Population: 380

Włościbórz [vwɔɕˈt͡ɕibuʂ] is a village in the administrative district of Gmina Sępólno Krajeńskie, within Sępólno County, Kuyavian-Pomeranian Voivodeship, in north-central Poland.
