= Sitno, Sępólno County =

Sitno
- Village
- Location within Poland
- Coordinates: 53°18′16.4″N 17°36′29.8″E
- Country: Poland
- Voivodeship: Kuyavian-Pomeranian
- County: Sępólno
- Gmina: Sośno
- Population: 500

Sitno [ˈɕitnɔ] is a village in the administrative district of Gmina Sośno, within Sępólno County, Kuyavian-Pomeranian Voivodeship, in north-central Poland.
