= Niechorz =

- Village
- Location within Poland
- Coordinates: 53°27′N 17°37′E
- Country: Poland
- Voivodeship: Kuyavian-Pomeranian
- County: Sępólno
- Gmina: Sępólno Krajeńskie
- Population: 350

Niechorz ([ˈɲɛxɔʂ]; German: Nichors) is a village in the administrative district of Gmina Sępólno Krajeńskie, within Sępólno County, Kuyavian-Pomeranian Voivodeship, in north-central Poland.
