= Frydrychowo, Sępólno County =

Frydrychowo
- Village
- Location within Poland
- Coordinates: 53°22′22″N 17°21′27″E
- Country: Poland
- Voivodeship: Kuyavian-Pomeranian
- County: Sępólno
- Gmina: Więcbork
- Population: 50

Frydrychowo [frɨdrɨˈxɔvɔ] is a village in the administrative district of Gmina Więcbork, within Sępólno County, Kuyavian-Pomeranian Voivodeship, in north-central Poland.
