= Wielowicz =

- Village
- Location within Poland
- Coordinates: 53°23′N 17°37′E
- Country: Poland
- Voivodeship: Kuyavian-Pomeranian
- County: Sępólno
- Gmina: Sośno
- Number Zone: (+48) 52
- Vehicle registration: CSE

Wielowicz [vjɛˈlɔvit͡ʂ] is a village in the administrative district of Gmina Sośno, within Sępólno County, Kuyavian-Pomeranian Voivodeship, in north-central Poland.
