= Hohenfelde =

Hohenfelde may refer to the following places in Germany:

- in Schleswig-Holstein:
  - Hohenfelde, Steinburg, in the district of Steinburg
  - Hohenfelde, Plön, in the district of Plön
  - Hohenfelde, Stormarn, in the district of Stormarn
- Hohenfelde, Mecklenburg-Vorpommern, in the district of Bad Doberan, Mecklenburg-Vorpommern
- Hohenfelde, Hamburg, a quarter in Hamburg

It may also refer to the former German name (from 1875–1945) for Wysoka Krajeńska, a village in Sępólno County, Kuyavian-Pomeranian Voivodeship, in north-central Poland.
