= Leśniewice =

Leśniewice may refer to:

- Leśniewice, Kuyavian-Pomeranian Voivodeship, Poland
- Leśniewice, Masovian Voivodeship, Poland
