= Dwanaście Apostołów =

- Village
- Location within Poland
- Coordinates: 53°22′30.86″N 17°23′37.5″E
- Country: Poland
- Voivodeship: Kuyavian-Pomeranian
- County: Sępólno
- Gmina: Więcbork

Dwanaście Apostołów [dvaˈnaɕt͡ɕɛ apɔsˈtɔwuf] is a village in the administrative district of Gmina Więcbork, within Sępólno County, Kuyavian-Pomeranian Voivodeship, in north-central Poland.
