= Teklanowo =

- Village
- Location within Poland
- Coordinates: 53°29′23″N 17°40′12″E
- Country: Poland
- Voivodeship: Kuyavian-Pomeranian
- County: Sępólno
- Gmina: Sępólno Krajeńskie
- Population: 100

Teklanowo [tɛklaˈnɔvɔ] is a village in the administrative district of Gmina Sępólno Krajeńskie, within Sępólno County, Kuyavian-Pomeranian Voivodeship, in north-central Poland.
