= Lutowo, Kuyavian-Pomeranian Voivodeship =

Lutowo
- Village
- Location within Poland
- Coordinates: 53°26′53.17″N 17°26′12.67″E
- Country: Poland
- Voivodeship: Kuyavian-Pomeranian
- County: Sępólno
- Gmina: Sępólno Krajeńskie
- Population: 460

Lutowo ([luˈtɔvɔ]; German: Groß Lutau) is a village in the administrative district of Gmina Sępólno Krajeńskie, within Sępólno County, Kuyavian-Pomeranian Voivodeship, in north-central Poland.

== Notable residents ==
- Wilhelm Reinhard (SS officer) (1869–1955)
