= Wąwelno =

- Village
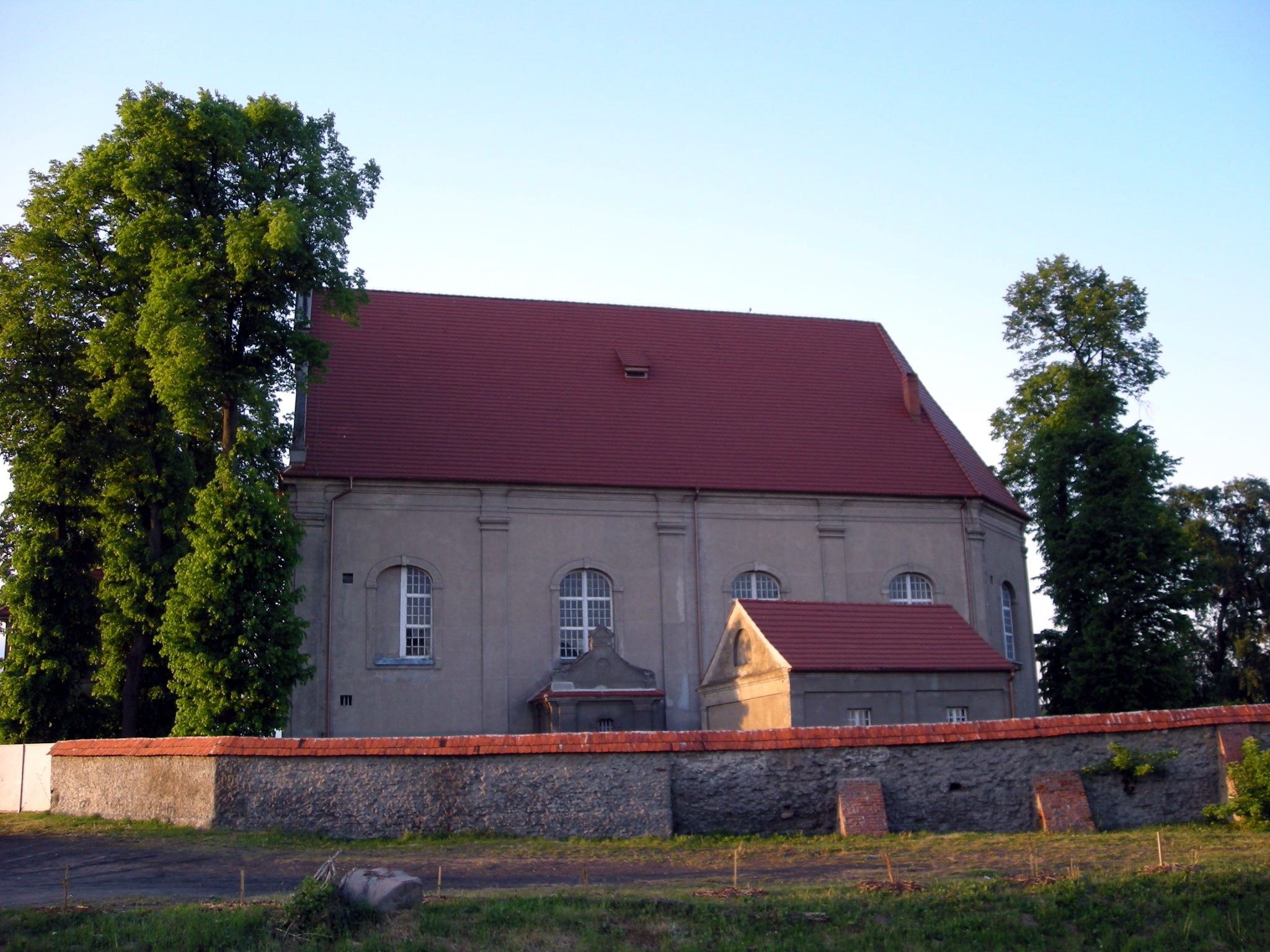
- Church in Wąwelno

- Location within Poland
- Coordinates: 53°19′N 17°41′E
- Country: Poland
- Voivodeship: Kuyavian-Pomeranian
- County: Sępólno
- Gmina: Sośno
- Population: 570
- Postcode: 89-413
- Area code: (+48) 52
- Vehicle registration: CSE

Wąwelno [vɔ̃ˈvɛlnɔ] is a village in the administrative district of Gmina Sośno, within Sępólno County, Kuyavian-Pomeranian Voivodeship, in north-central Poland.

== Notable residents ==
- Rudolf Bauer (artist)
