= Sikorz =

- Village
- Location within Poland
- Coordinates: 53°27′N 17°33′E
- Country: Poland
- Voivodeship: Kuyavian-Pomeranian
- County: Sępólno
- Gmina: Sępólno Krajeńskie
- Population: 200

Sikorz ([ˈɕikɔʂ]; German: Szykorsz, from 1894–1945 Schönhorst) is a village in the administrative district of Gmina Sępólno Krajeńskie, within Sępólno County, Kuyavian-Pomeranian Voivodeship, in north-central Poland.
