= Jazdrowo =

- Village
- Location within Poland
- Coordinates: 53°25′N 17°21′E
- Country: Poland
- Voivodeship: Kuyavian-Pomeranian
- County: Sępólno
- Gmina: Sępólno Krajeńskie
- Population: 120

Jazdrowo [jazˈdrɔvɔ] is a village in the administrative district of Gmina Sępólno Krajeńskie, within Sępólno County, Kuyavian-Pomeranian Voivodeship, in north-central Poland.
