= Dębowiec, Sępólno County =

Dębowiec
- Village
- Location within Poland
- Coordinates: 53°22′34″N 17°39′36″E
- Country: Poland
- Voivodeship: Kuyavian-Pomeranian
- County: Sępólno
- Gmina: Sośno
- Area code: (+48) 52
- Vehicle registration: CSE

Dębowiec [dɛmˈbɔvjɛt͡s] is a village in the administrative district of Gmina Sośno, within Sępólno County, Kuyavian-Pomeranian Voivodeship, in north-central Poland.
