= Skoraczewiec =

- Village
- Location within Poland
- Coordinates: 53°19′24″N 17°38′4″E
- Country: Poland
- Voivodeship: Kuyavian-Pomeranian
- County: Sępólno
- Gmina: Sośno

Skoraczewiec [skɔraˈt͡ʂɛvjɛt͡s] is a village in the administrative district of Gmina Sośno, within Sępólno County, Kuyavian-Pomeranian Voivodeship, in north-central Poland.
