= Zakrzewska Osada =

- Village
- Location within Poland
- Coordinates: 53°22′N 17°25′E
- Country: Poland
- Voivodeship: Kuyavian-Pomeranian
- County: Sępólno
- Gmina: Więcbork

Zakrzewska Osada [zaˈkʂɛfska ɔˈsada] is a village in the administrative district of Gmina Więcbork, within Sępólno County, Kuyavian-Pomeranian Voivodeship, in north-central Poland. Additionally, Zakrzewska Osada covers 5.830 square kilometers in area.

In 2011, the population was 224 individual people, and the population density was 38.42 people per square kilometer.
