= Wilcze Jary =

- Village
- Location within Poland
- Coordinates: 53°21′20″N 17°18′30″E
- Country: Poland
- Voivodeship: Kuyavian-Pomeranian
- County: Sępólno
- Gmina: Więcbork
- Population: 60

Wilcze Jary [ˈvilt͡ʂɛ ˈjarɨ] is a village in the administrative district of Gmina Więcbork, within Sępólno County, Kuyavian-Pomeranian Voivodeship, in north-central Poland.
