= Dąbie, Sępólno County =

Dąbie
- Village
- Location within Poland
- Coordinates: 53°23′46″N 17°29′33″E
- Country: Poland
- Voivodeship: Kuyavian-Pomeranian
- County: Sępólno
- Gmina: Więcbork

Dąbie [ˈdɔmbjɛ] is a village in the administrative district of Gmina Więcbork, within Sępólno County, Kuyavian-Pomeranian Voivodeship, in north-central Poland.
