= Dalkowo, Kuyavian-Pomeranian Voivodeship =

Dalkowo
- Village
- Location within Poland
- Coordinates: 53°23′20″N 17°29′24″E
- Country: Poland
- Voivodeship: Kuyavian-Pomeranian
- County: Sępólno
- Gmina: Więcbork

Dalkowo [dalˈkɔvɔ] is a village in the administrative district of Gmina Więcbork, within Sępólno County, Kuyavian-Pomeranian Voivodeship, in north-central Poland.
