= Zgniłka =

- Village
- Location within Poland
- Coordinates: 53°20′N 17°24′E
- Country: Poland
- Voivodeship: Kuyavian-Pomeranian
- County: Sępólno
- Gmina: Więcbork

Zgniłka [ˈzɡniu̯ka] is a village in the administrative district of Gmina Więcbork, within Sępólno County, Kuyavian-Pomeranian Voivodeship, in north-central Poland.
