= Zakrzewek, Sępólno County =

Zakrzewek
- Village
- Location within Poland
- Coordinates: 53°23′N 17°27′E
- Country: Poland
- Voivodeship: Kuyavian-Pomeranian
- County: Sępólno
- Gmina: Więcbork

Zakrzewek [zaˈkʂɛvɛk] (German: Seemark; before 1907: Zakrzewke) is a village in the administrative district of Gmina Więcbork, within Sępólno County, Kuyavian-Pomeranian Voivodeship, in north-central Poland.
