= Lubcza =

Lubcza may refer to:

- Lubcza, Kuyavian-Pomeranian Voivodeship (north-central Poland)
- Lubcza, Lesser Poland Voivodeship (south Poland)
- Lubcza, Świętokrzyskie Voivodeship (south-central Poland)
- Lubcza, today's spelling Lyubcha, Belarus, a town in Grodno Region
