= Trzciany, Kuyavian-Pomeranian Voivodeship =

Trzciany
- Village
- Location within Poland
- Coordinates: 53°29′N 17°35′E
- Country: Poland
- Voivodeship: Kuyavian-Pomeranian
- County: Sępólno
- Gmina: Sępólno Krajeńskie
- Population: 300

Trzciany ([ˈtʂt͡ɕanɨ]; German: Zahn) is a village in the administrative district of Gmina Sępólno Krajeńskie, within Sępólno County, Kuyavian-Pomeranian Voivodeship, in north-central Poland.
