= Skoraczewo, Kuyavian-Pomeranian Voivodeship =

Skoraczewo
- Village
- Location within Poland
- Coordinates: 53°18′20″N 17°38′13″E
- Country: Poland
- Voivodeship: Kuyavian-Pomeranian
- County: Sępólno
- Gmina: Sośno
- Population: 210

Skoraczewo [skɔraˈt͡ʂɛvɔ] is a village in the administrative district of Gmina Sośno, within Sępólno County, Kuyavian-Pomeranian Voivodeship, in north-central Poland.
