= Grochowiec =

- Village
- Location within Poland
- Coordinates: 53°25′05″N 17°32′32″E
- Country: Poland
- Voivodeship: Kuyavian-Pomeranian
- County: Sępólno
- Gmina: Sępólno Krajeńskie
- Population: 150

Grochowiec ([ɡrɔˈxɔvjɛt͡s]; German: Müllerhof) is a village in the administrative district of Gmina Sępólno Krajeńskie, within Sępólno County, Kuyavian-Pomeranian Voivodeship, in north-central Poland.
