= Komierówko =

- Village
- Location within Poland
- Coordinates: 53°26′59″N 17°36′29″E
- Country: Poland
- Voivodeship: Kuyavian-Pomeranian
- County: Sępólno
- Gmina: Sępólno Krajeńskie
- Population: 30

Komierówko [kɔmjɛˈrufkɔ] is a village in the administrative district of Gmina Sępólno Krajeńskie, within Sępólno County, Kuyavian-Pomeranian Voivodeship, in north-central Poland.
