= Obodowo =

- Village
- Location within Poland
- Coordinates: 53°25′38″N 17°42′10″E
- Country: Poland
- Voivodeship: Kuyavian-Pomeranian
- County: Sępólno
- Gmina: Sośno
- Area code: (+48) 52
- Vehicle registration: CSE

Obodowo [ɔbɔˈdɔvɔ] (German: Obendorf) is a village in the administrative district of Gmina Sośno, within Sępólno County, Kuyavian-Pomeranian Voivodeship, in north-central Poland.
