= Tonin, Poland =

Tonin
- Village
- Location within Poland
- Coordinates: 53°21′N 17°40′E
- Country: Poland
- Voivodeship: Kuyavian-Pomeranian
- County: Sępólno
- Gmina: Sośno

Tonin [ˈtɔnin] is a village in the administrative district of Gmina Sośno, within Sępólno County, Kuyavian-Pomeranian Voivodeship, in north-central Poland.
