= Rudolf Bauer (artist) =

German artist

- Portrait of Rudolf Bauer, c. 1940s
- Born: 11 February 1889; Lindenwald, Wirsitz, Posen, Prussia, Germany (modern Poland)
- Died: 28 November 1953 (aged 64); Deal, Monmouth County, New Jersey, US
- Known for: Painting
- Movement: Non-objective art
- Website: rudolf-bauer.com

Alexander Georg Rudolf Bauer (11 February 1889 – 28 November 1953) was a German-born painter who was involved in the avant-garde group Der Sturm in Berlin, and whose work would become central to the non-objective art collection of Solomon R. Guggenheim.

== Early life ==
Born in Lindenwald, County of Wirsitz near Bromberg, Province of Posen, Kingdom of Prussia, to middle-class parents, Bauer's family moved to Berlin, Brandenburg, in his youth. Bauer made art from an early age, but his father was disapproving, even beating him when Bauer announced his intention to go to art school. In spite of this discouragement Bauer left home and attended the Academy of Fine Arts.

== Der Sturm ==
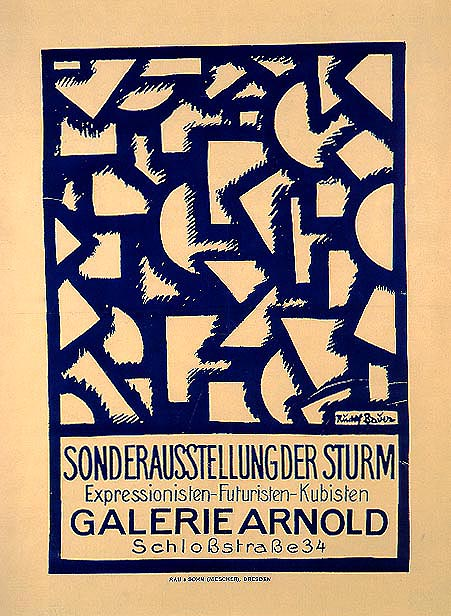
Bauer went through several phases in his artistic expression, including a Cubist period as witnessed by this poster for a 1918 exhibition of Der Sturm in Dresden, Saxony.

Bauer supported himself as an artist by creating illustrations and caricatures for some of the major magazines and newspapers of the day. In 1912, as Bauer continued to do figurative and commercial work, he began working in an abstract mode. That same year he met Herwarth Walden, who had just founded the magazine Der Sturm and the affiliated gallery. Der Sturm would become the most important artistic center in Berlin at this period. In 1915 Bauer was invited to participate in a group show at Der Sturm. He would continue to actively participate in the Der Sturm gallery scene through the mid-1920s. He had his first solo show there in 1917, with 120 "Lyrical Abstract" works, with solo shows in 1919 and 1920. Among the artists who were in the Der Sturm group were Wassily Kandinsky, Marc Chagall, Paul Klee, and Franz Marc. Like Paul Klee, Bauer became a teacher in the Sturm School.

In 1916 Bauer was introduced to the Baroness Hilla Rebay von Ehrenwiesen. Rebay, also an artist, met Bauer at Der Sturm, and they became lovers. Bauer and Rebay shared a studio beginning in 1919, but her family did not approve of Bauer. In the early 1920s she traveled to Italy. She and Bauer would continue to write to one another regularly, but their relationship became platonic, though still fraught with difficulties.

== Société Anonyme ==
In 1920 Katherine Sophie Dreier, the preeminent collector and co-founder of the Société Anonyme, with Marcel Duchamp and Man Ray, visited Berlin and bought several works by Bauer including the oil Andante V (now in the permanent collection of the Yale University Art Gallery). She would later write in 1949 that Bauer's paintings "were very beautiful and subtle in color and helped to introduce abstract art to the people. We had no artist in those early years whose work so appealed to the public in general and which received so much response."

== Solomon R. Guggenheim ==
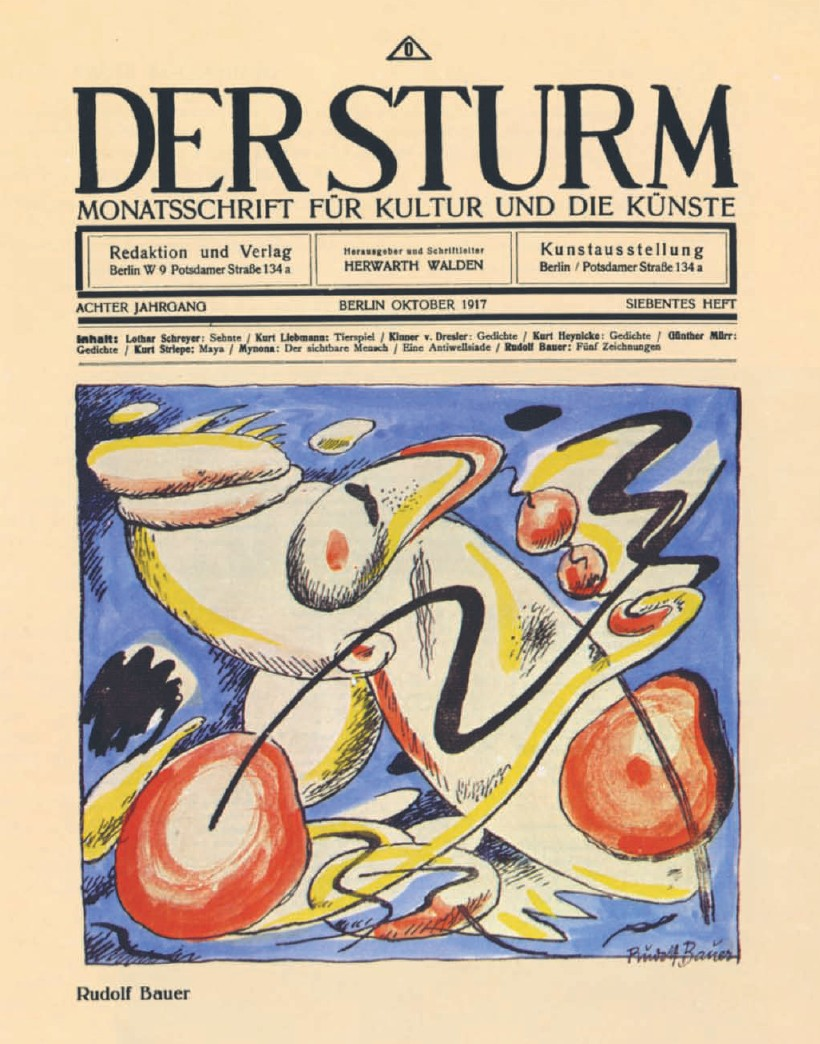
Bauer designed the cover art of several editions of the art newspaper Der Sturm.

Bauer remained in Berlin, province of Brandenburg, Free State of Prussia, in the 1920s and continued to make both abstract, or as the movement came to be known, "non-objective" art [a translation of the German gegenstandslos], as well as figurative work to support himself. In 1927 Hilla Rebay traveled to the United States. A year later she began a portrait commission of copper magnate Solomon R. Guggenheim. Rebay showed Guggenheim non-objective art by Bauer and Kandinsky, and he decided to start a collection of the work.

In 1930 Solomon Guggenheim and his wife, Irene, traveled with Rebay to Germany to meet Bauer and Kandinsky. By this point, Bauer's work had moved from lyrical to geometric abstraction, which would dominate the rest of his artistic career. Guggenheim bought several of Bauer's new works and also put him on a stipend, which allowed Bauer to open his own museum for his work and the work of other non-objective painters such as Kandinsky. He called his museum Das Geistreich, or "The Realm of the Spirit."

In June 1937 Guggenheim formed the Solomon R. Guggenheim Foundation for his collection, with Rebay as its official curator. The Gibbes Museum of Art in Charleston, Charleston County, South Carolina, hosted the first public showing of the Solomon R. Guggenheim Collection of Non-Objective Paintings in March 1936. Bauer traveled to the United States for the first time to be present at the opening of the exhibition. From that show a solo show of his work traveled to the Arts Club of Chicago, Cook County, Illinois, where he also visited. There would be yearly showings of this collection for the next four years at various museums.

== Gestapo prison ==
In 1938, upon his return to Germany from an exhibition of his work in Paris, France, Bauer was arrested by the Nazis for his "degenerate" art and for speculating on the black market – meaning selling his work to Guggenheim. The previous year Bauer's work had been included in the infamous Degenerate Art show in Munich, organized by the Nazis to show all the deviant, abstract art. In spite of this Bauer had refused to move from his home country. Upon his arrest Bauer was held in a Gestapo prison for several months, as Rebay and Guggenheim worked to free him. After several false starts, he was finally released unconditionally in August 1938. During his time in prison, he created dozens of non-objective drawings on scavenged scraps of paper. He spent the next months getting his paperwork in order and made the difficult decision to leave his homeland, emigrating to the United States in July 1939, just months before the beginning of World War II.

== Arrival in the United States ==
Bauer in his Duesenberg Phaeton automobile, 193?, unidentified photographer. Rudolf Bauer papers, Archives of American Art

Bauer arrived in Manhattan, New York, New York County, New York, just after the official opening of the Museum of Non-Objective Painting in midtown Manhattan. Located at 24 East 54th Street, the new museum was unlike anything the New York art world had seen. The floors as well as the walls were carpeted, and the large paintings hung in oversized frames very close to the ground. The museum played recordings by Bach, Beethoven, and Chopin constantly and exclusively. Bauer's work Orange Accent was featured on the invitation to the opening exhibition titled The Art of Tomorrow.

Bauer lived with Rebay for a few months before moving to one of Guggenheim's homes in Deal, Monmouth County, New Jersey, an upscale and beautiful but isolated coastal town. At this point, Guggenheim proposed a contract with Bauer. Bauer, not properly understanding the English of the contract signed it, having been assured that his concerns were met. He thought he was to receive a lump-sum amount for 110 paintings he had already furnished Guggenheim. Instead Guggenheim put that amount ($300,000) in trust for Bauer to receive a monthly stipend. He was also now obligated to leave his future work to the foundation. As part of this contract, Bauer also received the last payment for a Duesenberg car body custom designed by Bauer. (Note: This car, known as the Bauer SJ, is the last Duesenberg ever made and is also the longest at 20 feet and 6 inches. On 19 January 2007, it sold at an auction in Phoenix, Maricopa County, Arizona, for $2.8 million U.S. dollars.)

Bauer's life's work had become completely tied up in the foundation, and he had been assured he would have a role in running it. This proved quickly not to be the case, and Bauer became very upset about the fate of his paintings. He stopped painting altogether, and made no further works the rest of his life, evidently not wanting to give the foundation the satisfaction of having any more of his work. Eventually Bauer's relationship with Rebay became very strained, culminating in a libel suit against Rebay because Rebay had insulted Bauer's new wife, his maid Louise Huber, whom he had married in 1944.

In 1949 things changed drastically for Rebay when Solomon Guggenheim died. Within a couple of years of Solomon's death the trustees abandoned Guggenheim's original vision for the collection. Hilla Rebay was asked to step down as curator, and all of Guggenheim's non-objective collection was sent to storage. In 1953, Bauer died in Deal, Monmouth County, New Jersey, of lung cancer. The newly renamed Solomon R. Guggenheim Museum opened in 1959 without a single work of Bauer's on its walls.

== Out of obscurity ==
Bauer's work was basically unseen for the next two decades. In 1967 Bauer's work was shown at the Guggenheim in Seven Decades, A Selection for the first time since his death. In 1969 his work was given a large retrospective at the Galerie Gmurzynska in Cologne, North Rhine-Westphalia, West Germany. This was followed by several solo exhibitions in New York and Europe. Since that time, Bauer's work has begun to get more attention from art collectors and museums. In 2005 the Guggenheim Museum mounted Art of Tomorrow: Hilla Rebay and Solomon R. Guggenheim, which featured many Bauer works and traveled also to the Museum Villa Stuck and the Deutsche Guggenheim, West Berlin. A major retrospective of Bauer's work took place at Weinstein Gallery, San Francisco, San Francisco County, California, in 2007. Weinstein Gallery also represents the artist's estate and archives. 60 of Bauer's drawings and paintings have been gifted to the Boca Raton Museum of Art.

== Performing arts ==
In 2008, Grace and Michael Productions released a video-biography entitled Betrayal: The Life and Art of Rudolf Bauer. This piece was produced and written by Ken Swartz, with executive producers Rowland Weinstein and Jim Swanson. The piece was narrated by Linda Hunt.

In March 2014, San Francisco Playhouse premiered the play Bauer, a historically accurate yet fictionally-told interpretation of Bauer's affairs with his wife, Hilla Rebay, and Solomon Guggenheim, as told through the story of a high-tension meeting between Bauer, Bauer's wife, and Hilla Rebay. The play, which received general acclaim, was performed off-Broadway at New York's 59E59 Theaters later that year.

== See also ==
- List of German painters

== Notes ==
References
