= Ostrówek, Sępólno County =

Ostrówek
- Village
- Location within Poland
- Coordinates: 53°20′39″N 17°36′45″E
- Country: Poland
- Voivodeship: Kuyavian-Pomeranian
- County: Sępólno
- Gmina: Sośno
- Population (2006): 100
- Area code: (+48) 52
- Vehicle registration: CSE

Ostrówek [ɔsˈtruvɛk] is a village in the administrative district of Gmina Sośno, within Sępólno County, Kuyavian-Pomeranian Voivodeship, in north-central Poland.
