= Skarpa, Kuyavian-Pomeranian Voivodeship =

Skarpa
- Village
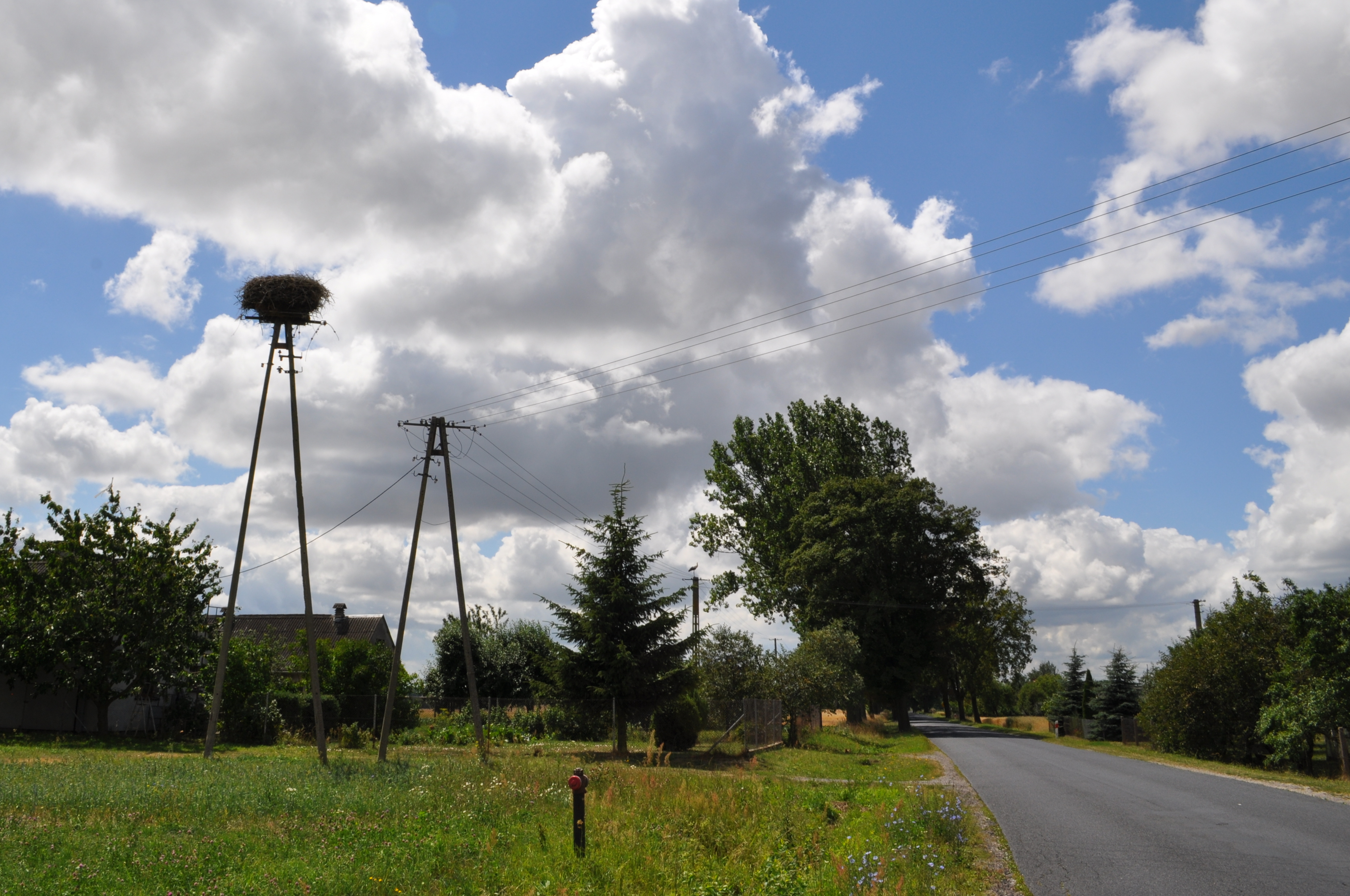

- Location within Poland
- Coordinates: 53°29′54″N 17°37′28″E
- Country: Poland
- Voivodeship: Kuyavian-Pomeranian
- County: Sępólno
- Gmina: Sępólno Krajeńskie

Population
  - Total: 310

Skarpa [ˈskarpa] is a village in the administrative district of Gmina Sępólno Krajeńskie, within Sępólno County, Kuyavian-Pomeranian Voivodeship, in north-central Poland.
