= Kawle, Poland =

Kawle
- Village
- Location within Poland
- Coordinates: 53°25′52″N 17°29′14″E
- Country: Poland
- Voivodeship: Kuyavian-Pomeranian
- County: Sępólno
- Gmina: Sępólno Krajeńskie
- Population: 310

Kawle ([ˈkavlɛ]; German: Kable) is a village in the administrative district of Gmina Sępólno Krajeńskie, within Sępólno County, Kuyavian-Pomeranian Voivodeship, in north-central Poland.
