= Zielonka, Sępólno County =

Zielonka
- Village
- Location within Poland
- Coordinates: 53°24′13″N 17°41′44″E
- Country: Poland
- Voivodeship: Kuyavian-Pomeranian
- County: Sępólno
- Gmina: Sośno

Zielonka [ʑɛˈlɔŋka] is a village in the administrative district of Gmina Sośno, within Sępólno County, Kuyavian-Pomeranian Voivodeship, in north-central Poland.
