= Sypniewo, Kuyavian-Pomeranian Voivodeship =

Sypniewo
- Village
- Location within Poland
- Coordinates: 53°22′N 17°19′E
- Country: Poland
- Voivodeship: Kuyavian-Pomeranian
- County: Sępólno
- Gmina: Więcbork
- Population: 1,300

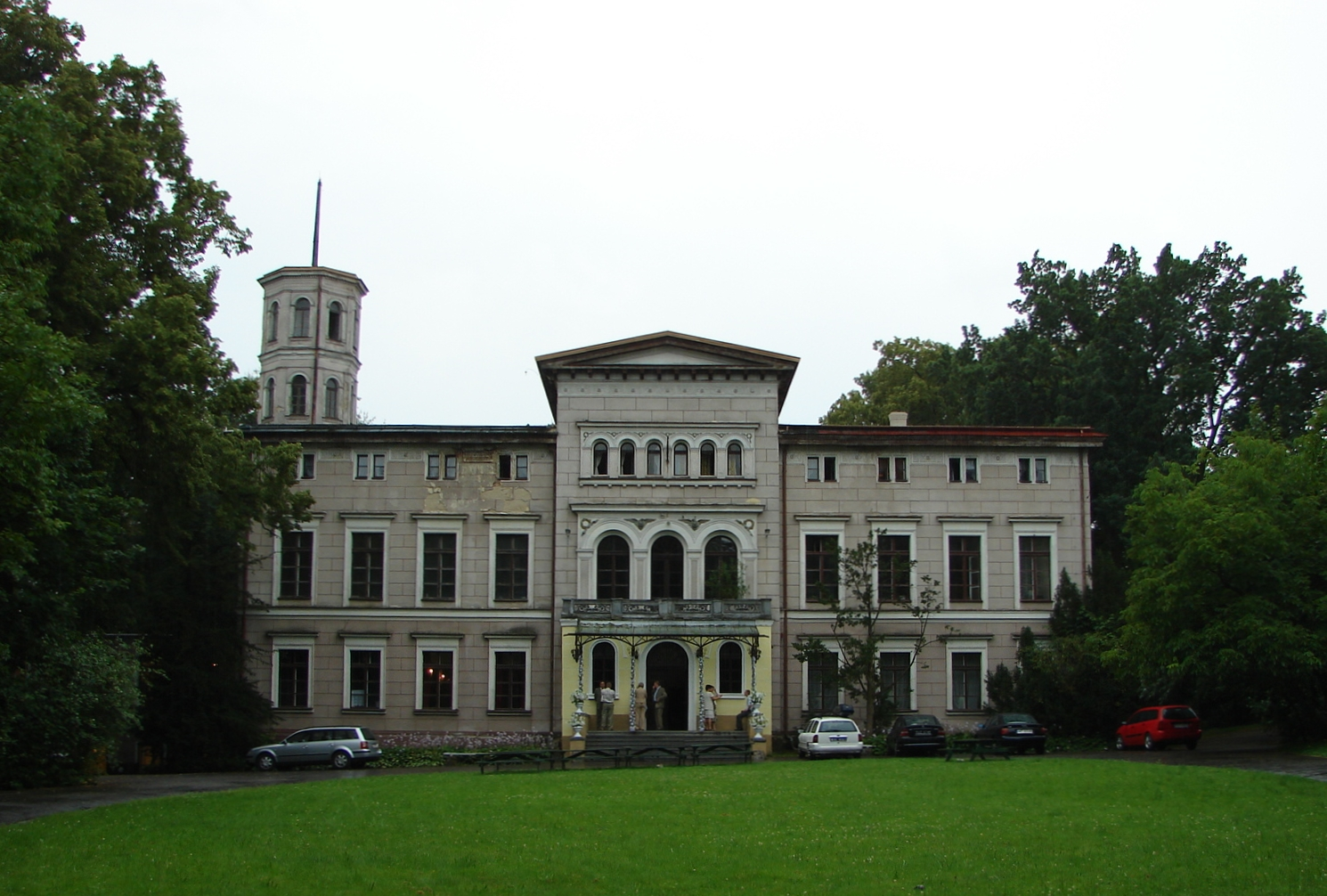
The manor house built about 1850. Now serves as hotel.

Sypniewo [sɨpˈɲɛvɔ] is a village in the administrative district of Gmina Więcbork, within Sępólno County, Kuyavian-Pomeranian Voivodeship, in north-central Poland.
