= Borówki, Kuyavian-Pomeranian Voivodeship =

Borówki
- Village
- Location within Poland
- Coordinates: 53°25′11″N 17°38′25″E
- Country: Poland
- Voivodeship: Kuyavian-Pomeranian
- County: Sępólno
- Gmina: Sośno
- Population (2006): 30
- Area code: (+48) 52
- Vehicle registration: CSE

Borówki [bɔˈrufki] is a village in the administrative district of Gmina Sośno, within Sępólno County, Kuyavian-Pomeranian Voivodeship, in north-central Poland.
