= Wysoka Krajeńska =

- Village
- Location within Poland
- Coordinates: 53°22′46″N 17°33′22″E
- Country: Poland
- Voivodeship: Kuyavian-Pomeranian
- County: Sępólno
- Gmina: Sępólno Krajeńskie
- Population: 140

Wysoka Krajeńska ([vɨˈsɔka kraˈjɛɲska]; German: Wissoka, from 1875–1945 Hohenfelde) is a village in the administrative district of Gmina Sępólno Krajeńskie, within Sępólno County, Kuyavian-Pomeranian Voivodeship, in north-central Poland.
