= Chmielniki, Kuyavian-Pomeranian Voivodeship =

Chmielniki
- Village
- Location within Poland
- Coordinates: 53°25′29″N 17°31′34″E
- Country: Poland
- Voivodeship: Kuyavian-Pomeranian
- County: Sępólno
- Gmina: Sępólno Krajeńskie

Chmielniki [xmjɛlˈniki] is a village in the administrative district of Gmina Sępólno Krajeńskie, within Sępólno County, Kuyavian-Pomeranian Voivodeship, in north-central Poland.
