= Gmina Sośno =

Gmina Sośno Sośno Commune
- Gmina
- Coat of arms
- Interactive map of Gmina Sośno
- Coordinates (Sośno): 53°23′23″N 17°41′11″E
- Country: Poland
- Voivodeship: Kuyavian-Pomeranian
- County: Sępólno
- Seat: Sośno

Area
  - Total: 162.76 km^{2} (62.84 sq mi)

Population (2006)
  - Total: 5,095
  - Density: 31.30/km^{2} (81.08/sq mi)
- Website: http://www.sosno.ug.gov.pl

Gmina Sośno is a rural gmina (administrative district) in Sępólno County, Kuyavian-Pomeranian Voivodeship, in north-central Poland. Its seat is the village of Sośno, which lies approximately 13 kilometres (8 mi) south-east of Sępólno Krajeńskie and 37 km (23 mi) north-west of Bydgoszcz.

The gmina covers an area of 162.76 square kilometres (62.8 sq mi), and as of 2006 its total population is 5,095.

The gmina contains part of the protected area called Krajna Landscape Park.

== Villages ==
Gmina Sośno contains the villages and settlements of Borówki, Ciosek, Dębiny, Dębowiec, Dziedno, Jaszkowo, Leśniewice, Mierucin, Obodowo, Ostrówek, Płosków, Przepałkowo, Rogalin, Roztoki, Sitno, Skoraczewiec, Skoraczewko, Skoraczewo, Sośno, Świdwie, Szynwałd, Tonin, Toninek, Tuszkowo, Wąwelno, Wielowicz, Wielowiczek and Zielonka.

== Neighbouring gminas ==
Gmina Sośno is bordered by the gminas of Gostycyn, Koronowo, Mrocza, Sępólno Krajeńskie, Sicienko and Więcbork.
