= Zabartowo =

- Village
- Location within Poland
- Coordinates: 53°18′N 17°32′E
- Country: Poland
- Voivodeship: Kuyavian-Pomeranian
- County: Sępólno
- Gmina: Więcbork

Zabartowo [zabarˈtɔvɔ] is a village in the administrative district of Gmina Więcbork, within Sępólno County, Kuyavian-Pomeranian Voivodeship, in north-central Poland.
