= Świdwie, Gmina Sośno =

Świdwie
- Village
- Location within Poland
- Coordinates: 53°24′41″N 17°33′10″E
- Country: Poland
- Voivodeship: Kuyavian-Pomeranian
- County: Sępólno
- Gmina: Sośno

Świdwie [ˈɕfidvjɛ] is a village in the administrative district of Gmina Sośno, within Sępólno County, Kuyavian-Pomeranian Voivodeship, in north-central Poland.
