= Borzyszkowo, Kuyavian-Pomeranian Voivodeship =

Borzyszkowo
- Village
- Location within Poland
- Coordinates: 53°18′55″N 17°25′46″E
- Country: Poland
- Voivodeship: Kuyavian-Pomeranian
- County: Sępólno
- Gmina: Więcbork
- Population (approx.): 170

Borzyszkowo [bɔʐɨʂˈkɔvɔ] is a village in the administrative district of Gmina Więcbork, within Sępólno County, Kuyavian-Pomeranian Voivodeship, in north-central Poland.

The village has an approximate population of 170.
