= Leśniewice, Kuyavian-Pomeranian Voivodeship =

Leśniewice
- Village
- Location within Poland
- Coordinates: 53°17′33″N 17°41′17″E
- Country: Poland
- Voivodeship: Kuyavian-Pomeranian
- County: Sępólno
- Gmina: Sośno
- Area code: (+48) 52
- Vehicle registration: CSE

Leśniewice [lɛɕɲɛˈvit͡sɛ] is a village in the administrative district of Gmina Sośno, within Sępólno County, Kuyavian-Pomeranian Voivodeship, in north-central Poland.
