= Witunia =

- Village
- Location within Poland
- Coordinates: 53°22′N 17°29′E
- Country: Poland
- Voivodeship: Kuyavian-Pomeranian
- County: Sępólno
- Gmina: Więcbork
- Population: 700

Witunia [viˈtuɲa] is a village in the administrative district of Gmina Więcbork, located within Sępólno County in the Kuyavian-Pomeranian Voivodeship of north-central Poland.
