= Jastrzębiec, Sępólno County =

Jastrzębiec
- Village
- Location within Poland
- Coordinates: 53°21′14″N 17°35′53″E
- Country: Poland
- Voivodeship: Kuyavian-Pomeranian
- County: Sępólno
- Gmina: Więcbork

Jastrzębiec [jasˈtʂɛmbjɛt͡s] is a village in the administrative district of Gmina Więcbork, within Sępólno County, Kuyavian-Pomeranian Voivodeship, in north-central Poland.
