= Gmina Sępólno Krajeńskie =

Gmina Sępólno Krajeńskie Sępólno Krajeńskie Commune
- Gmina
- Flag Coat of arms
- Interactive map of Gmina Sępólno Krajeńskie
- Coordinates (Sępólno Krajeńskie): 53°27′0″N 17°31′48″E
- Country: Poland
- Voivodeship: Kuyavian-Pomeranian
- County: Sępólno
- Seat: Sępólno Krajeńskie

Area
  - Total: 229.18 km^{2} (88.49 sq mi)

Population (2006)
  - Total: 15,907
  - Density: 69.408/km^{2} (179.77/sq mi)
  - Urban: 9,258
  - Rural: 6,649
- Website: http://www.gmina-sepolno.pl

Gmina Sępólno Krajeńskie is an urban-rural gmina (administrative district) in Sępólno County, Kuyavian-Pomeranian Voivodeship, in north-central Poland. Its seat in the historic Krajna region is the town of Sępólno Krajeńskie, which lies approximately 49 kilometres (30 mi) north-west of Bydgoszcz.

The gmina covers an area of 229.18 square kilometres (88.5 sq mi), and as of 2006 its total population is 15,907 (out of which the population of Sępólno Krajeńskie amounts to 9,258, and the population of the rural part of the gmina is 6,649).

The gmina contains part of the protected area called Krajna Landscape Park.

== Villages ==
Apart from the town of Sępólno Krajeńskie, Gmina Sępólno Krajeńskie contains the villages and settlements of Chmielniki, Dziechowo, Grochowiec, Iłowo, Jazdrowo, Kawle, Komierówko, Komierowo, Lutówko, Lutowo, Niechorz, Piaseczno, Radońsk, Sikorz, Skarpa, Świdwie, Teklanowo, Trzciany, Wałdówko, Wałdowo, Wilkowo, Wiśniewa, Wiśniewka, Włościborek, Włościbórz, Wysoka Krajeńska, Zalesie and Zboże.

== Neighbouring gminas ==
Gmina Sępólno Krajeńskie is bordered by the gminas of Debrzno, Gostycyn, Kamień Krajeński, Kęsowo, Lipka, Sośno and Więcbork.
