= Więcbork =

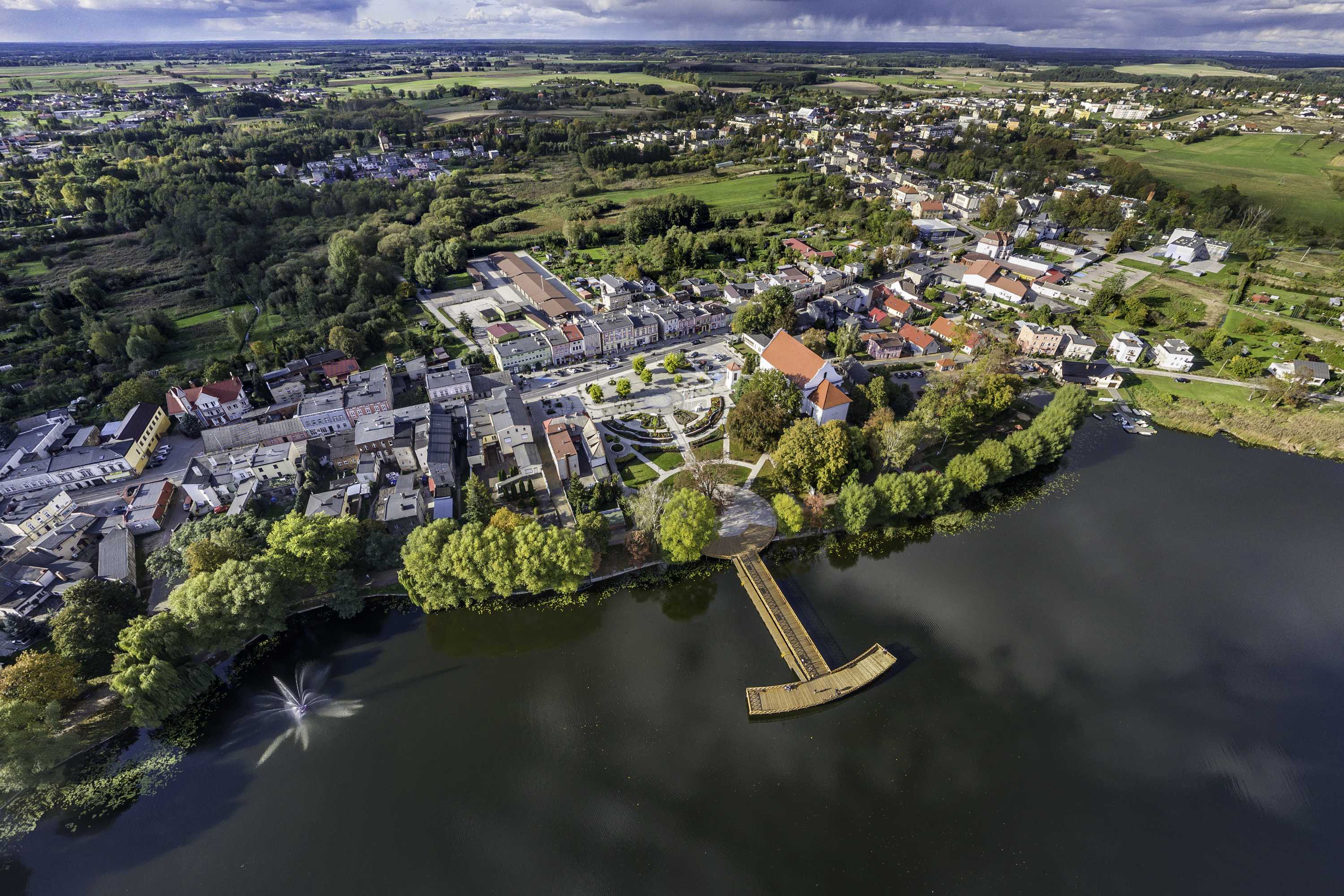
- Aerial view of Więcbork

- Flag Coat of arms

- Location within Poland
- Coordinates: 53°21′15″N 17°29′34″E
- Country: Poland
- Voivodeship: Kuyavian-Pomeranian
- County: Sępólno
- Gmina: Więcbork

Area
  - Total: 4.31 km^{2} (1.66 sq mi)

Population (2019)
  - Total: 5,965
  - Density: 1,380/km^{2} (3,580/sq mi)
- Time zone: UTC+1 (CET)
  - Summer (DST): UTC+2 (CEST)
- Postal code: 89-410
- Vehicle registration: CSE
- Website: http://www.wiecbork.pl

Więcbork ([ˈvjɛnd͡zbɔrk]; German: Vandsburg) is a town in northern Poland, located in the Sępólno County in the Kuyavian-Pomeranian Voivodeship. In 2019 it had a population of 5,965. It is located on the shores of Więcborskie Lake within the ethnocultural region of Krajna.

== History ==
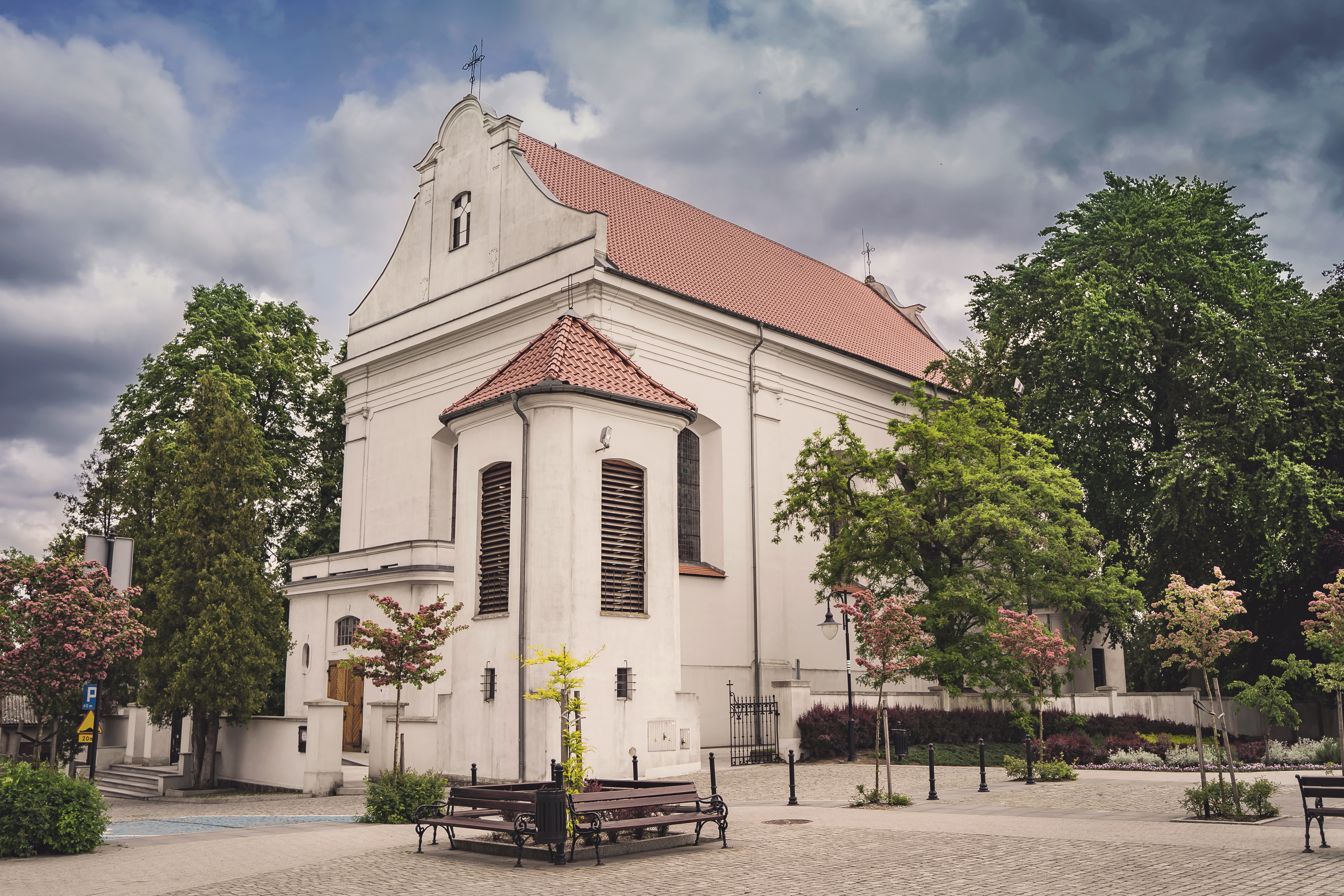
Baroque Saints Simon and Jude church

After 960 the territory became a part of the emerging Polish state under its first historic ruler Mieszko I. It is first mentioned under the name Wanszowna in historical records in the chronicle of Jan of Czarnków in 1383. The first record instance of the name Więcbork occurred in 1405. The town was part of the Kingdom of Poland and it was a private town, which belonged to various Polish magnates. Administratively it was located in the Nakło County in the Kalisz Voivodeship in the Greater Poland Province.

After the First Partition of Poland in 1772 the town became part of Kingdom of Prussia, under the name Vandsburg. After the successful Greater Poland uprising of 1806, it was regained by Poles and included within the short-lived Duchy of Warsaw. In 1815 it was reannexed by Prussia, where it was administratively part of the Flatow district (Landkreis Flatow). It was subjected to Germanisation policies and German colonization. Following World War I, Poland regained independence and the town was eventually reintegrated with the re-established Polish Republic after the Treaty of Versailles in 1920. The town became part of Sępólno County, under the restored Polish name Więcbork.

During the joint German-Soviet invasion of Poland, which started World War II in September 1939, Więcbork was invaded by Nazi Germany. During the invasion, the Einsatzgruppe IV entered the town to commit atrocities against Poles. The town was annexed by Germany, and included within the Landkreis Zempelburg (district) under the name Vandsburg. During the German occupation, Poles were subject to persecutions, mass arrests, expulsions and massacres. Numerous Poles were imprisoned in a concentration camp in Radzim and in a prison established by the Selbstschutz in Sępólno Krajeńskie, and later murdered there or deported to other Nazi concentration camps. Mass arrests of Poles were carried out from September 1939. In 1945 the town was restored to Poland.

=== Number of inhabitants by years ===
Historical population
Year	Pop.	±%
1805	640	—
1853	1,586	+147.8%
1905	2,836	+78.8%
1921	2,588	−8.7%
1931	3,433	+32.7%
2010	5,813	+69.3%

== Neighbourhoods ==
Więcbork is divided into the following neighbourhoods: Stare Miasto (Old Town), Korea, Lupinek, Plebanka, Osiedle BOWiD, Osiedle Piastowskie, Osiedle Słoneczne, Osiedle Tartaczne.

== Sports ==
Grom Więcbork sports club is based in Więcbork, with football, athletics, weightlifting, chess and duplicate bridge sections.
