= Sośno =

- Village
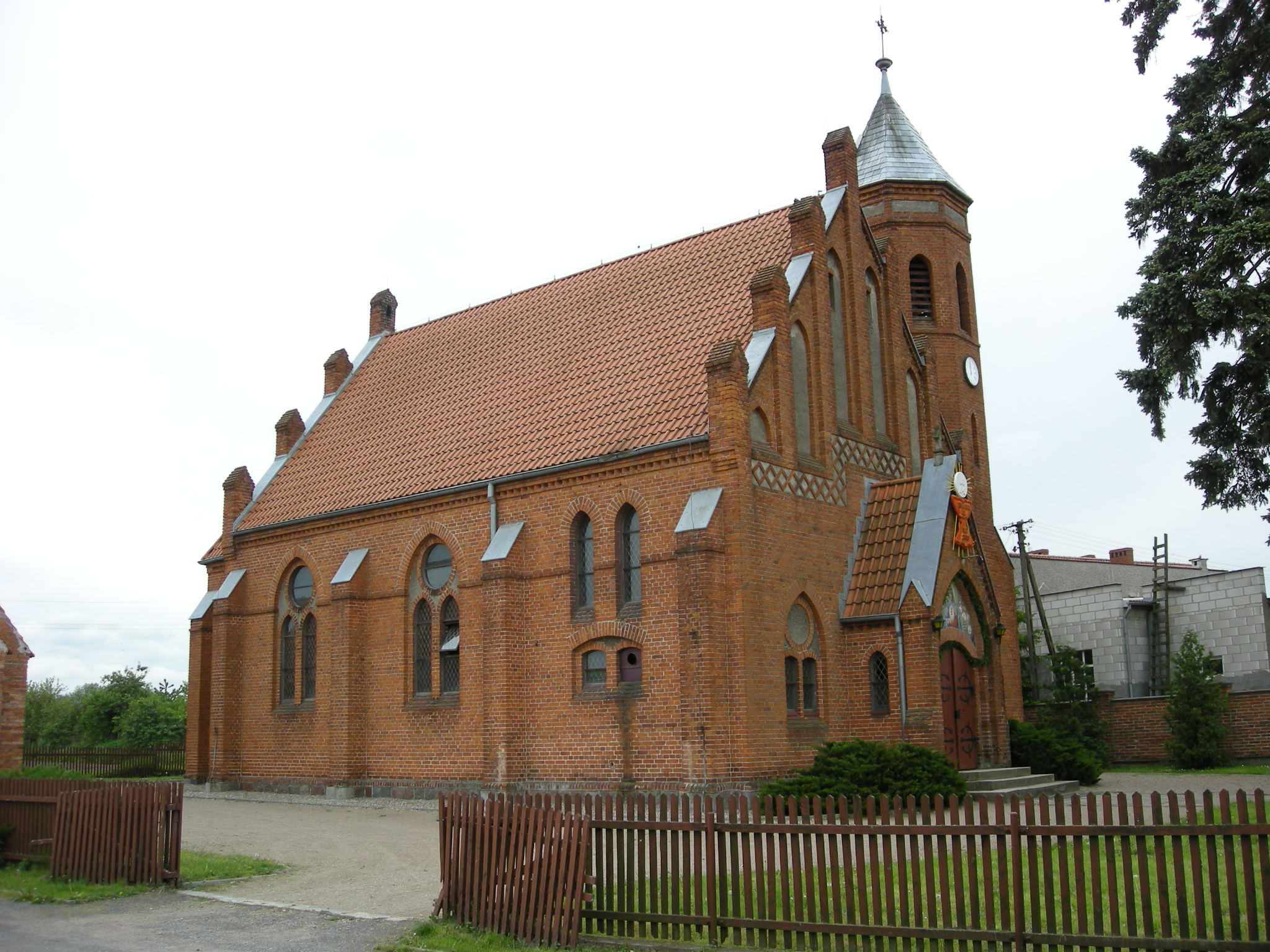

- Coat of arms

- Location within Poland
- Coordinates: 53°23′23″N 17°41′11″E
- Country: Poland
- Voivodeship: Kuyavian-Pomeranian
- County: Sępólno
- Gmina: Sośno
- Population (2006): 980
- Postal code: 89-412
- Area code: 52
- Vehicle registration: CSE

Sośno ([ˈsɔɕnɔ]; German: Soßnow) is a village in Sępólno County, Kuyavian-Pomeranian Voivodeship, in north-central Poland. It is the seat of the gmina (administrative district) called Gmina Sośno.
