= Gmina Więcbork =

Gmina Więcbork Więcbork Commune
- Gmina
- Coat of arms
- Interactive map of Gmina Więcbork
- Coordinates (Więcbork): 53°21′15″N 17°29′34″E
- Country: Poland
- Voivodeship: Kuyavian-Pomeranian
- County: Sępólno
- Seat: Więcbork

Area
  - Total: 235.71 km^{2} (91.01 sq mi)

Population (2006)
  - Total: 13,028
  - Density: 55.271/km^{2} (143.15/sq mi)
  - Urban: 5,788
  - Rural: 7,240
- Website: http://www.wiecbork.pl/

Gmina Więcbork is an urban-rural gmina (administrative district) in Sępólno County, Kuyavian-Pomeranian Voivodeship, in north-central Poland. Its seat is the town of Więcbork, which lies approximately 11 kilometres (7 mi) south of Sępólno Krajeńskie and 43 km (27 mi) north-west of Bydgoszcz.

The gmina covers an area of 235.71 square kilometres (91.0 sq mi), and as of 2006 its total population is 13,028 (out of which the population of Więcbork amounts to 5,788, and the population of the rural part of the gmina is 7,240).

The gmina contains part of the protected area called Krajna Landscape Park.

== Villages ==
Apart from the town of Więcbork, Gmina Więcbork contains the villages and settlements of Adamowo, Borzyszkowo, Czarmuń, Dąbie, Dalkowo, Dorotowo, Dwanaście Apostołów, Frydrychowo, Górowatki, Jastrzębiec, Jeleń, Karolewo, Katarzyniec, Klarynowo, Lubcza, Młynki, Nowy Dwór, Pęperzyn, Puszcza, Runowo Krajeńskie, Runowo-Młyn, Śmiłowo, Suchorączek, Sypniewo, Werski Most, Wilcze Jary, Witunia, Wymysłowo, Zabartowo, Zakrzewek, Zakrzewska Osada and Zgniłka.

== Neighbouring gminas ==
Gmina Więcbork is bordered by the gminas of Lipka, Łobżenica, Mrocza, Sępólno Krajeńskie, Sośno, Zakrzewo and Złotów.
