= Sępólno County =

Sępólno County Powiat sępoleński
- County
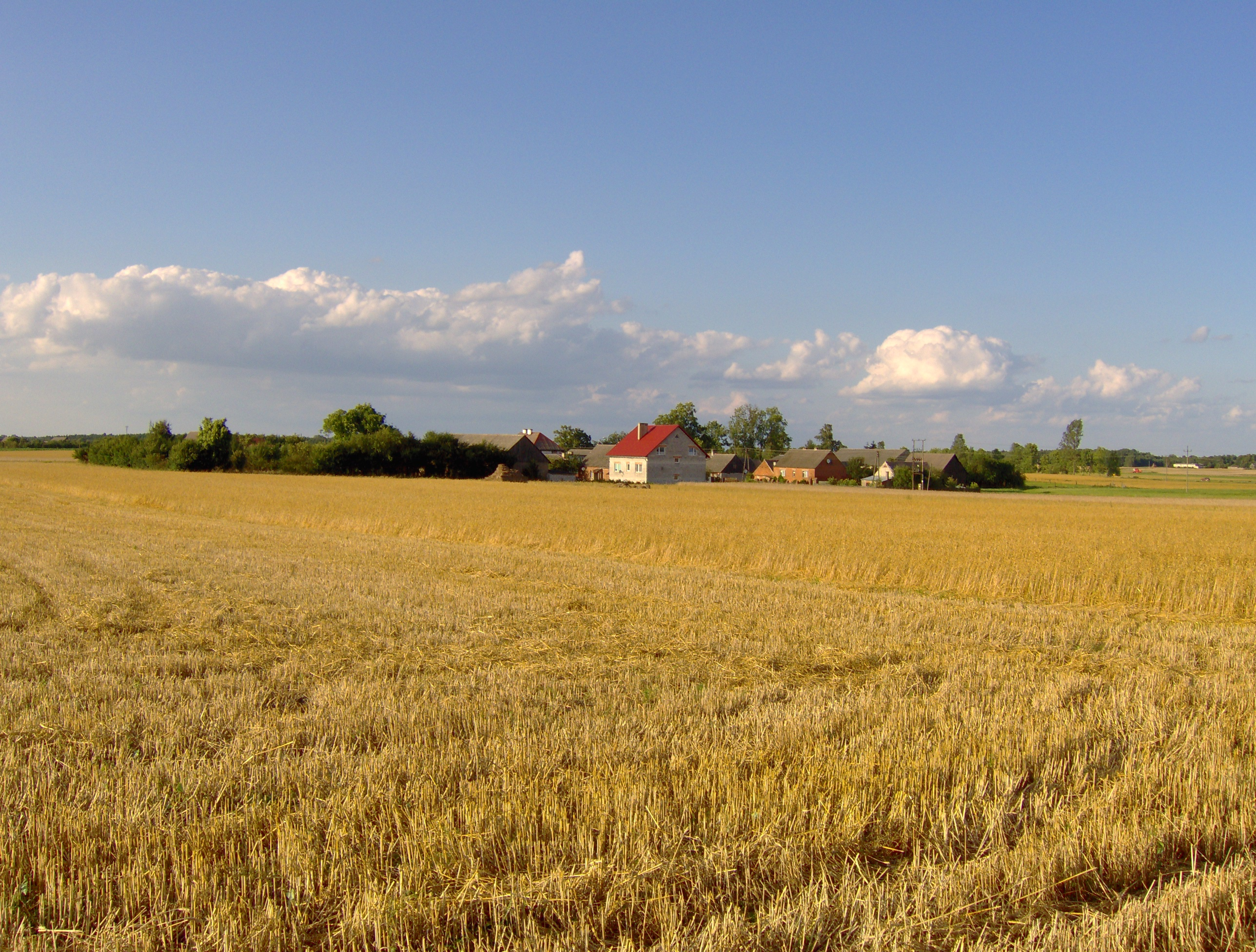

- Flag Coat of arms

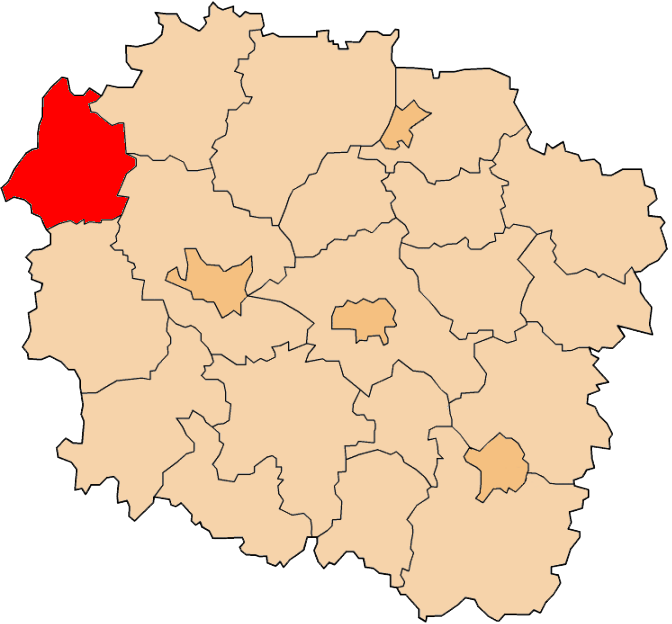
- Location within the voivodeship
- Coordinates (Sępólno Krajeńskie): 53°27′0″N 17°31′48″E
- Country: Poland
- Voivodeship: Kuyavian-Pomeranian
- Seat: Sępólno Krajeńskie
- Gminas: Total 4: Gmina Kamień Krajeński; Gmina Sępólno Krajeńskie; Gmina Sośno; Gmina Więcbork

Area
  - Total: 790.86 km^{2} (305.35 sq mi)

Population (2019)
  - Total: 41,055
  - Density: 51.912/km^{2} (134.45/sq mi)
  - Urban: 17,431
  - Rural: 23,624
- Car plates: CSE
- Website: www.powiat-sepolno.pl

Sępólno County (Polish: powiat sępoleński) is a unit of territorial administration and local government (powiat) in Kuyavian-Pomeranian Voivodeship, north-central Poland. It came into being on January 1, 1999, as a result of the Polish local government reforms passed in 1998. Its administrative seat and largest town is Sępólno Krajeńskie, which lies 49 km (30 mi) north-west of Bydgoszcz and 86 km (53 mi) north-west of Toruń. The county also contains the towns of Więcbork, lying 11 km (7 mi) south of Sępólno Krajeńskie, and Kamień Krajeński, 10 km (6 mi) north of Sępólno Krajeńskie.

The county covers an area of 790.86 square kilometres (305.4 sq mi). As of 2019 its total population is 41,055, out of which the population of Sępólno Krajeńskie is 9,091, that of Więcbork is 5,950, that of Kamień Krajeński is 2,390, and the rural population is 23,624.

== Neighbouring counties ==
Sępólno County is bordered by Człuchów County and Chojnice County to the north, Tuchola County to the north-east, Bydgoszcz County to the south-east, Nakło County to the south, and Piła County and Złotów County to the west.

== Administrative divisions ==
The county is subdivided into four gminas (three urban-rural and one rural). These are listed in the following table, in descending order of population.

Gmina	Type	Area (km^{2})	Population (2019)	Seat
Gmina Sępólno Krajeńskie	urban-rural	229.2	15,773	Sępólno Krajeńskie
Gmina Więcbork	urban-rural	235.7	13,333	Więcbork
Gmina Kamień Krajeński	urban-rural	163.2	6,946	Kamień Krajeński
Gmina Sośno	rural	162.8	5,003	Sośno
