= Zdrojewski =

Zdrojewski (feminine: Zdrojewska) is a Polish surname derived from one of placenames Drohojów, Zdrojewo, Zdrój, Zdroje. Notable people with the surname include:

- Barbara Zdrojewska (born 1960), Polish politician
- Bogdan Zdrojewski (born 1957), Polish politician
- Zbigniew Zdrojewski (1950–1996), Polish politician
