= Liberation (film series) =

- Original film poster
- Directed by: Yuri Ozerov
- Screenplay by: Yuri Bondarev; Oscar Kurganov; Yuri Ozerov
- Produced by: Lidia Kanareikina
- Starring: Nikolay Olyalin; Larisa Golubkina; Boris Seidenberg
- Narrated by: Artyom Karapetian
- Cinematography: Igor Slabnevich (70 mm)
- Edited by: Ekaterina Karpova
- Music by: Yuri Levitin
- Production companies: Mosfilm; DEFA-Babelsberg; ZF-Start (films I, II); Zespoły Filmowe (III-V); Avala Film (I); Dino de Laurentiis Cinematografica
- Release dates: 7 May 1970 (I, II); 31 July 1971 (III); 5 November 1971 (IV, V)
- Running time: 477 minutes (original); 445 minutes (remastered 2002 version); Part I: 88 minutes Part II: 85 minutes Part III: 122 minutes Part IV: 79 minutes Part V: 71 minutes
- Countries: Soviet Union; East Germany; Poland; Yugoslavia; Italy
- Languages: Russian, German, English, Polish, Italian, French, Serbo-Croatian

Liberation (Russian: Освобождение, translit. Osvobozhdenie, German: Befreiung, Polish: Wyzwolenie) is a film series released in 1970 and 1971, directed by Yuri Ozerov and shot in wide-format NIKFI process (70 mm). The script was written by Yuri Bondarev and Oscar Kurganov. The series was a Soviet-Polish-East German-Italian-Yugoslav co-production.

The films are a dramatized account of the liberation of the Soviet Union's territory and the subsequent defeat of Nazi Germany in the Great Patriotic War, focusing on five major Eastern Front campaigns: the Battle of Kursk, the Lower Dnieper Offensive, Operation Bagration, the Vistula–Oder Offensive, and the Battle of Berlin.

== Plot ==
=== Film I: The Fire Bulge ===
After the Soviets are alerted to the imminent German offensive in Kursk, they launch a preemptive artillery strike, delaying the enemy. The battalion of Lieutenant Colonel Lukin – led by officers Tzvetaev, Orlov, and Maximov – participates in the battle, as well as the tank of Lieutenant Vasiliev.

In KZ Sachsenhausen, Yakov Dzhugashvili refuses Andrey Vlasov's offer to exchange him for Friedrich Paulus. Meanwhile, in Kursk, the Germans advance. Maximov flees, but finally turns back and chooses to be shot when captured.

When hearing about the German proposal regarding Yakov, Stalin rejects it, saying he will not trade a Field Marshal for a soldier. The Yugoslav partisans break out of an encirclement. The Soviet counter-offensive is launched in Kursk. Erich von Manstein commits all his forces to a final assault, bringing the Soviets close to defeat. Vatutin urges to send in the strategic reserve, which repels the Germans.

=== Film II: Breakthrough ===
After the Allied landing in Sicily, Mussolini is arrested on the King's orders. In Warsaw, the Polish Resistance bombs a German cinema. Mussolini is rescued by Otto Skorzeny and his commandos.

The Red Army reaches the Dnieper. Lukin's regiment crosses it, presumably as the division's vanguard; unbeknownst to them, they are merely a ploy to mislead the enemy. The regiment is cut off without reinforcements and wiped out. Lukin is killed. Tzvetaev leads the survivors back to their lines.

On Stalin's orders, the Soviet High Command plans its offensive on Kiev, stealthily redeploying their forces. The city is liberated. The Allied leaders meet in Tehran.

=== Film III: Direction of the Main Blow ===
==== Part 1 ====
Stalin informs his allies that a Soviet offensive will take place soon after the Normandy landings. The Stavka decides to strike in Belarus. Orlov leads his soldiers in a charge to rescue nurse Zoia, who insisted on evacuating the wounded from a battlefield.

After concluding that the Belarus marshes are passable, Rokossovsky demands that the main effort be directed towards Bobruysk and insists until Stalin approves. Panteleimon Ponomarenko orders the Belarusian partisans to attack all railways. Operation Bagration is launched.

==== Part 2 ====
The Soviets march on Bobruysk. Afterwards, they liberate Minsk. A group of German officers tries to assassinate Hitler and take power, but fails. Churchill is pleased to hear of this, fearing a peace would leave Europe to Stalin.

In Poland, Zawadzki and Berling watch the Bug River as the Polish 1st Army crosses it, saying they are happy to return home.

=== Film IV: The Battle of Berlin ===
Stalin orders to hasten the Vistula–Oder offensive in order to relieve the Allies. Karl Wolff is sent to negotiate with the Americans.

Zhukov rejects Stavka's order to take Berlin, fearing an attack on his flank. In Yalta, Stalin notifies Churchill and Roosevelt that he knows of their secret dealings with the enemy. Saying that trust is the most important thing, he tears apart the picture showing Allen Dulles and Wolff. Zhukov's forces cross the Oder and approach Berlin. The Soviets capture a teenage sniper; they send him to his mother. Vasilev's tank crushes into a house. The crew has a pleasant meal with the owner's family. The Soviets and the Poles storm the Tiergarten.

=== Film V: The Last Assault ===
In Berlin, Lieutenant Yartsev's infantry and Tzvetaev's battery fight their way in the U-Bahn. When Hitler orders the tunnels flooded, Tzvetaev drowns while rescuing civilians.

Captain Neustroev's company is selected to hoist the Victory Banner atop the Reichstag. A Soviet officer is assigned to Führerbunker as a communication operator for negotiations about German surrender. In the Führerbunker, after marrying Eva Braun, Hitler murders her and commits suicide. At the Reichstag, Dorozhkin is killed in the fighting. The Victory Banner is unfurled on the dome. The Berlin garrison surrenders unconditionally. Outside the Reichstag, Vasiliev, Orlov, Yartsev, and an immense crowd of Red Army soldiers celebrate victory.

== Cast ==
=== Soviet actors ===
- Nikolay Olyalin as Tzvetaev.
- Larisa Golubkina as Zoia.
- Vsevolod Sanayev as Lukin.
- Boris Seidenberg as Orlov.
- Viktor Avdyushko as Maximov.
- Yuriy Nazarov as Russian Liberation Army soldier.
- Mikhail Gluzsky as Ryazhentzev.
- Ivan Mykolaychuk as Savchuk.
- Leonid Kuravlyov as Chuikov's signaler.
- Bukhuti Zaqariadze as Joseph Stalin.
- Nikolay Bogolyubov as Kliment Voroshilov.
- Mikhail Ulyanov as Georgy Zhukov.
- Ivan Pereverzev as Vasily Chuikov.
- Roman Tkachuk as Alexei Yepishev.
- Anatoly Kuznetsov as Georgi Zakharov.
- Viktor Bortsov as Grigory Oriol.
- Yuri Leghkov as Ivan Konev (films I-II).
- Vasily Shukshin as Konev (films III-V).
- Mikhail Nozhkin as Yartsev
- Yuri Kamorny as Vasiliev.
- Valery Nosik as Dorozhkin.
- Evgeny Burenkov as Aleksandr Vasilevsky.
- Sergei Kharchenko as Nikolai Vatutin.
- Vladlen Davydov as Konstantin Rokossovsky.
- Dimitry Franko as Pavel Rybalko.
- Vladislav Strzhelchik as Aleksei Antonov.
- Konstantin Zabelin as Mikhail Katukov.
- Klion Protasov as Sergei Shtemenko.
- Aleksander Afanasiev as Dmitry Lelyushenko.
- Grigory Mikhaylov as Mikhail Malinin.
- Leonid Dovlatov as Sergei Galadzhev.
- Pyotr Glebov as Pavel Rotmistrov.
- Lev Polyakov as Andrei Grechko.
- Viktor Baikov as Vyacheslav Molotov.
- Alexei Glazyrin as Panteleimon Ponomarenko.
- Vladimir Korenev as Stepan Neustroev.
- Eduard Izotov as Alexei Berest.
- Vladimir Zamansky as Pavel Batov.
- Gennadi Khrashenikov as Mikhail Yegorov.
- Gogi Kharabdze as Meliton Kantaria.
- Yuri Pomernatzev as Andrey Vlasov.
- Ioseb Gugichaishvili as Yakov Dzhugashvili.
- Yuri Durov as Winston Churchill.
- Aleksander Barushnoi as Alan Brooke.
- Elizaveta Alexeeva as Eleanor Roosevelt.
- Nikolai Yeremenko Sr. as Josip Broz Tito.
- Yulia Dioshi as Magda Goebbels.
- Georgi Tusuzov as Victor Emmanuel III.
- Vladimir Samoilov as Divisional Commander Gromov
- Pyotr Shcherbakov as General Telegin

=== East German actors ===
- Fritz Diez as Adolf Hitler.
- Horst Giese as sapper Bruno Fermella (I)/Joseph Goebbels (IV-V).
- Gerd Michael Henneberg as Wilhelm Keitel.
- Werner Dissel as Alfred Jodl.
- Siegfried Weiß as Erich von Manstein.
- Peter Sturm as Walter Model.
- Hannjo Hasse as Günther von Kluge.
- Alfred Struwe as Claus Schenk von Stauffenberg.
- Martha Beschort-Diez as old woman in Berlin.
- Horst Gill as Otto Günsche.
- Angelika Waller as Eva Braun.
- Erich Thiede as Heinrich Himmler.
- Kurt Wetzel as Hermann Göring.
- Joachim Pape as Martin Bormann.
- Fred Alexander as Elyesa Bazna.
- Peter Marx as Theodor Busse.
- Hans-Ulrich Lauffer as Gustav Schmidt.
- Erich Gerberding as Ernst Busch.
- Ralf Böhmke as Adolf Hamann.
- Wilfried Ortmann as Friedrich Olbricht.
- Hans-Edgar Stecher as Werner von Haeften.
- Werner Wieland as Ludwig Beck.
- Otto Dierichs as Erwin von Witzleben.
- Paul Berndt as Albrecht Mertz von Quirnheim (III)/Artur Axmann (IV-V).
- Max Bernhardt as Carl Friedrich Goerdeler.
- Manfred Bendik as Ernst John von Freyend.
- Rolf Ripperger as Adolf Heusinger.
- Fritz-Ernst Fechner as Heinz Brandt.
- Willi Schrade as Wolfram Röhrig.
- H. Schelske as Friedrich Fromm.
- Hinrich Köhn as Otto Ernst Remer.
- Herbert Körbs as Heinz Guderian.
- Joseph (Sepp) Klose as Karl Wolff.
- Fred Mahr as Sepp Dietrich.
- Gert Hänsch as Helmut Weidling.
- Hans-Hartmut Krüger as Hans Krebs.
- Otto Busse as Heinz Linge.
- Georg-Michael Wagner as Walter Wagner.

=== Polish actors ===
- Jan Englert as Jan Wolny.
- Stanisław Jaśkiewicz as Franklin Delano Roosevelt.
- Daniel Olbrychski as Henryk.
- Barbara Brylska as Helena.
- Wieńczysław Gliński as 'Blacksmith'.
- Ignacy Machowski as stableman.
- Franciszek Pieczka as Pelka.
- Tadeusz Schmidt as Zygmunt Berling.
- Maciej Nowakowski as Alexander Zawadzki.

=== Others ===
- Ivo Garrani as Benito Mussolini.
- Erno Bertoli as Pierre Pouyade.
- Florin Piersic as Otto Skorzeny.
- B. White as Hughe Knatchbull-Hugessen.

== Production ==
=== Background ===
Yuri Ozerov was a student at GITIS when he was conscripted into the Red Army in 1939. Ozerov later told his wife that during the Battle of Königsberg, he swore that one day "he would tell the story of the great army that fought in the war". After demobilization, he became a director in the Mosfilm studios.

In the 1960s, both the Soviet government and military command were dismayed and disgruntled by several Western films about World War II which made no reference to the Red Army's participation in it, most prominently The Longest Day, though in 1967 Metro-Goldwyn-Mayer was planning an American-Russian international co-production of Cornelius Ryan's The Last Battle about the fall of Berlin. In late 1965, a year after Leonid Brezhnev's rise to power, a meeting of senior officials from the Ministry of Defence, Ministry of Culture and Ministry of Finance was convened. They decided to commission "a monumental epic" which would demonstrate the importance of the Soviet role in the war. Ozerov, who shared the establishment's sentiments and for whom "it was unbearable, as a veteran, to watch those Western films", was chosen to direct it.

In the Brezhnev era, the commemoration of the Second World War was awarded unprecedented importance. Historian Nina Tumarkina described it as "the cult of the Great Patriotic War": its memory, molded according to official historiography, was to serve as a unifying narrative; reverence towards the sacrifices made became the core of a new Soviet patriotism. Denise J. Youngblood described Liberation as the "Brezhnev era's canonical war film", writing that it was "clearly designed to buttress the war cult."

=== Development ===
Work on the series commenced in 1966. German film scholar Ralf Schenk noted that "virtually all means were made available... for Ozerov"; Lars Karl estimated the project's budget was equivalent to US$40 million. The director was also closely supervised – the series had to meet the approval of General Alexei Yepishev, the Chief of the Armed Forces' Political Directorate, as well as that of Mikhail Suslov. Lazar Lazarev, a member of the Soviet Filmmakers' Association, wrote "Liberation ...was forced down from above, from the Ideological Departments". From the very beginning, it was made clear that the films should not deal with the darker chapters of World War II, such as the defense of Moscow and Stalingrad, but only with the Red Army's unbroken string of victories from the Battle of Kursk onwards.

At first, two prominent authors, Konstantin Simonov and Viktor Nekrasov, were offered to write the script. Both saw Liberation as an effort to rehabilitate Stalin, and declined. After Nekrasov's and Simonov's refusal, Yuri Bondarev and Oscar Kurganov were tasked with writing the script. Originally, the series was supposed to be a purely historical, documentary-like trilogy called The Liberation of Europe 1943–45. Fearing this style would discourage viewers, it was decided to combine fictional characters into the plot. Bondarev wrote the live action scenes; Kurganov was responsible for the historical parts, featuring the leaders and generals. The latter sections were intentionally filmed in black-and-white, to resemble old footage. The script introduced many little-known details about the Soviet-German War's history, that were rarely discussed publicly: notably, General Andrey Vlasov was presented for the first time in Soviet cinema. Vlasov's was an uncredited role, referred to only as "the General" on set.

Foreign film studios were invited to take part in the production, beside Mosfilm: The East German company DEFA, The Yugoslav Avala Film and the Italian Dino de Laurentiis Cinematografica. Zespół Filmowy Start, the first Polish studio to participate in the co-production of Liberation, was closed at April 1968. It was replaced by Przedsiębiorstwo Realizacji Filmów-Zespoły Filmowe (PRF-ZF).

Ozerov asked Marshal Georgy Zhukov to be the films' chief military consultant. However, Zhukov had little political influence at the time, and the establishment did not approve of him. Eventually, General Sergei Shtemenko took the role. In spite of this, Ozerov consulted with Zhukov unofficially, and the Marshal provided him with the draft of his memoirs. There were other consultants, as well: Generals Alexander Rodimtsev, Grigory Oriol and Sergei Siniakov, Vice-Admiral Vladimir Alexeyev, Polish Army Colonel Zbigniew Załuski and National People's Army Colonel Job von Witzleben.

The script of the first two parts was completed by the end of 1966, and the producers began preparing to commence filming shortly after.

=== Casting ===
A major obstacle facing the producers was that most of the Soviet leadership took part in the war; Many high-ranking officers and politicians were portrayed in the films with their wartime ranks, and the actors depicting them had to receive the models' blessing.

Ozerov lengthily dwelt on the question who would be cast as Zhukov, until the Marshal himself aided him, telling he thought about the star of The Chairman. Thus, Mikhail Ulyanov received the role. Ivan Konev was irritated by Yuri Leghkov, who depicted him in the first two parts. He demanded Ozerov would replace him with someone else, complaining the actor was constantly bothering him with questions. Vasily Shukshin was called to substitute Leghkov.

For the character of Tzvetaev, Ozerov chose the young Nikolay Olyalin, an actor of the Krasnoyarsk Children Theater. Olyalin had received several offers to appear in other films, but the theater managers dispersed of them, fearing he would leave them. One of the theater employees told Olyalin of Ozerov's offer. He claimed he was sick and then boarded a plane to Moscow.

The Kazakh SSR's People's Artist Yuri Pomerantsev was cast as Vlasov after an assistant-director saw him in theater. He had difficulties finding any material on the character. Bukhuti Zaqariadze was selected to appear in the sensitive role of Joseph Stalin. Vasily Shukshin recounted that upon seeing Zaqariadze in the Stalin costume – that was made by the dead premier's own personal tailor, who was contacted by the studio for this purpose – General Shtemenko instinctively stood to attention and saluted.

East German actor Fritz Diez was reluctant to portray Hitler. He had already appeared as such in three other films and feared becoming "a slave to one role". Diez's wife, Martha, played the old woman who served coffee to Tzvetaev in Berlin. The Italian Ivo Garrani played Benito Mussolini.

=== Principal photography ===
150 tanks 2,000 artillery pieces and 5,000 extras, mostly Soviet soldiers, were involved in the making of all the five parts of the series. The producers searched in vain for real Tiger I and Panther tanks: eventually, replicas of 10 Tigers and 8 Panthers (converted from T-44 and IS-2 tanks respectively) were manufactured in a Soviet tank factory in Lvov. Beside those, many T-55s, T-62s and IS-3s – models that were developed after the war – can be clearly seen in the film, painted as German or Soviet tanks.

It was considered to film the Fire Bulge in Kursk, but the old battlefield was littered with unexploded ordnance. Therefore, a special set was constructed in the vicinity of Pereiaslav-Khmelnytskyi where art director Alexander Myaghkov was free to use live explosives. The combat scenes in the first two parts were shot there, in the summer of 1967. 3,000 troops, 100 tanks, 18 military aircraft and hundreds of artillery pieces were used to recreate the Battle of Kursk; 30 kilometers of trenches were dug to resemble the wartime fortifications. Ozerov supervised the set from a specially-built tower, using a handkerchief to signal the engineers when to detonate the charges. On one occasion, the director absentmindedly blew his nose, and "one and half tons of TNT went off". The outdoor photography for Main Blow took place in Lithuania, near Pabradė, since the marshes in Belarus – the location of the 1944 battles depicted in the film – were being drained. The Italian parts were shot in Rome, while the Yalta Conference was filmed in the Livadia Palace.

Filming also took place in Poland. The scenes in Warsaw were shot in the city's Castle Square and at the Służewiec neighbourhood. The 20 July 1944 assassination attempt was filmed in the original Wolfsschanze.

The scenes in Berlin were mostly shot in the city itself. East German Foreign Minister Otto Winzer had authorized the producers to use the ruins of the Gendarmenmarkt. Ozerov, accompanied by a crew of some 2000 people, cordoned off a part of the area and used an old, abandoned cathedral to substitute for the Reichstag. The hoisting of the Victory Banner was shot atop the Haus der Technik in the Wilhelmstraße. Indoor fighting was filmed in Mosfilm's studios, and the U-Bahn scene took place in Moscow's metro – where Myaghkov rebuilt the Kaiserhof station.

=== Approval ===
The Fire Bulge was completed in late 1968. A special screening was made to Shtemenko, who had only two comments to make: first, a scene showing a soldier entertaining local girls in his tank had to be removed; Second, when seeing the actor portraying him with major general ranks, he claimed he was already a lieutenant general at the time. Ozerov answered that according to their material, he was not. The aforementioned scene does not appear in the film.

A more important pre-release viewing had to be held for Defense Minister Andrei Grechko and Yepishev. After the screening ended, the generals headed for the exit without saying a word. Ozerov asked for their opinion; Grechko answered, "I will not say a word to you!" and left the room. The film had to be edited four times before it was authorized for public screening in 1969, together with the already finished second part, Breakthrough. The two had their world premiere in July 1969, during the VI Moscow Film Festival.

== Reception ==
=== Distribution ===
The Fire Bulge and Breakthrough were released together in 2,202 prints on 7 May 1970 (including more than 200 prints in 70 mm), two days before the 25th anniversary of Victory Day. Richard Stites reported that the Communist Party instructed all its members to purchase tickets. 56.1 million people watched the first, of which 56 million returned after the intermission for the second. Those figures were lower than expected, as popular pictures about the war which did not enjoy such promotion had much larger audiences. Yet still, The Fire Bulge/Breakthrough reached the first place at the Soviet box office for 1970. Together, they are also the 31st and the 32nd highest-grossing Soviet films ever.

Direction of the Main Blow, distributed in 1,476 prints, had 35.8 million viewers, making it to the third place on the 1971 box office. Finally, the two concluding films, The Battle of Berlin and The Last Assault were released together in 1,341 prints. They had an audience of 28 million, reaching the 11th place for 1972. Denise J. Youngblood wrote that, considering the "unprecedented" public relations campaign the film received and the forced attendance of viewers, the last part's success of drawing only 28 million moviegoers was "almost pitiable". She attributed this, partially, to the "grandiose scale" of the films, which made it hard to maintain the interest of the audience. Youngblood concluded that the series was a "relative failure".

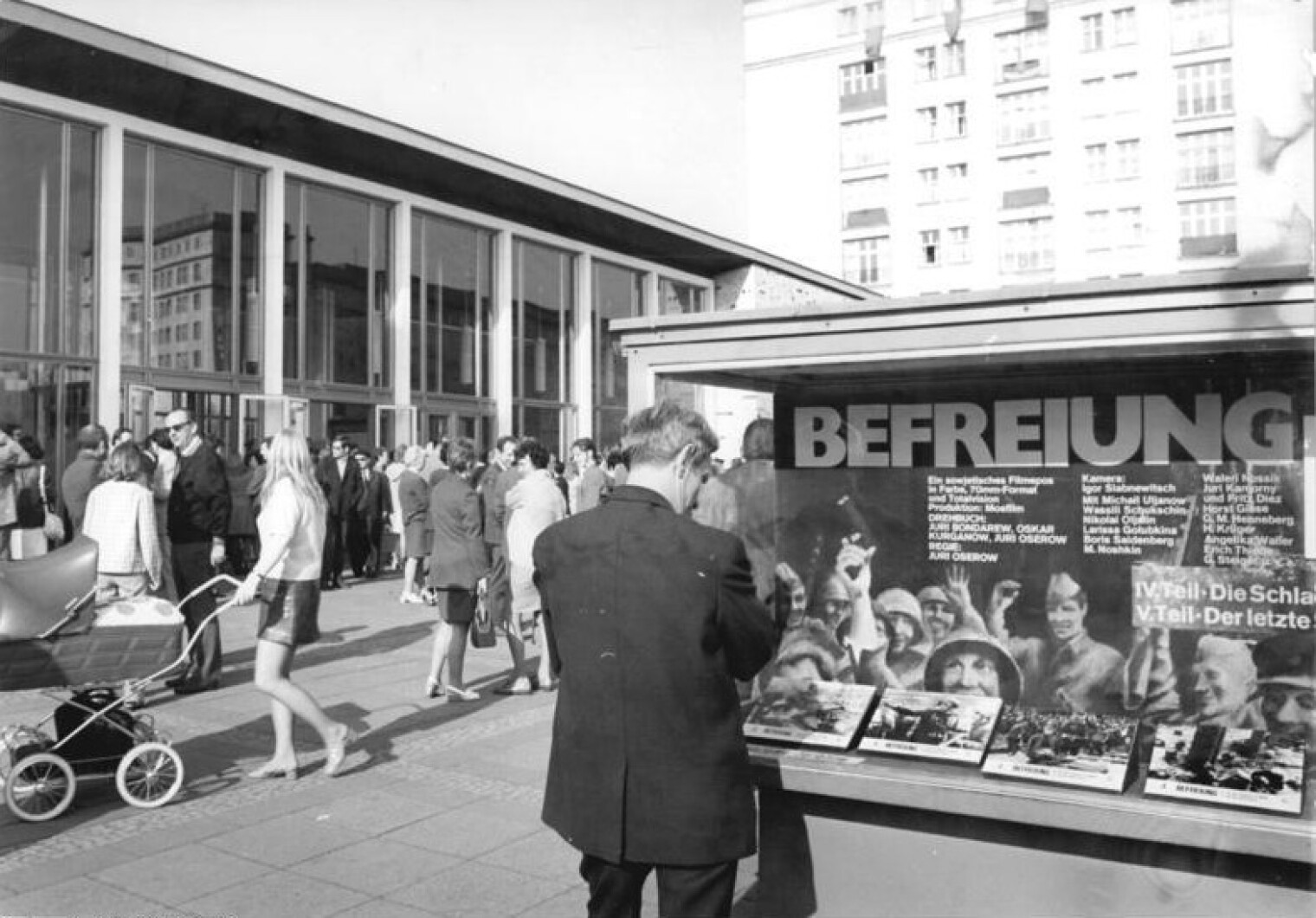
Advertising for the last two parts of the film on May 8, 1972 in the Berlin film theater Kosmos, where the GDR premieres took place.

The series was distributed in 115 countries around the world. In the People's Republic of Bulgaria, it sold a total of 7 million tickets. In the German Democratic Republic, 4 million people watched The Fire Bulge/Breakthrough between its release in November 1970 until the opening of Main Blow in June 1971. The series was endorsed also by the East German government. The East Berlin premiere was attended by Socialist Unity Party of Germany's leadership, and the state film distributor Progress Film declared in its policy guidelines that "each young citizen of our country should watch this picture already during his time at school"; it became part of the curriculum, and pupils have watched it in mandatory showings. The Free German Youth often held screenings at culture evenings.

According to official Soviet statistics, Liberation sold more than 400 million tickets worldwide. In the English-speaking world, a shorter, 118-minutes long version was disseminated under the title The Great Battle.

=== Awards ===
The Fire Bulge/Breakthrough was screened outside the competition in the 1970 Karlovy Vary International Film Festival, and Yuri Ozerov received a special prize of the Czechoslovak-Soviet Friendship Society.

The readers of the journal Sovietsky Ekran, the State Committee for Cinematography's official publication, chose The Direction of the Main Blow as the best film of 1971.

Ozerov, Bondarev, Cinematographer Igor Slabnevich and Art Director Alexander Myaghkov were all awarded the Lenin Prize in 1972 for their work on Liberation. The films won the Best Film Award at the 1972 Tiflis All-Union Film Festival, and Ozerov received the Polish-Soviet Friendship Society's Silver Medal in 1977. The series was submitted by the Soviet Union as a candidate for the Best Foreign Language Film in the 46th Academy Awards, but was not accepted as a nominee.

=== Critical response ===
In accordance with government endorsement, the Soviet press excessively promoted the Liberation, and war veterans published columns praising its authenticity. The Soviet Cinema: Encyclopedic Dictionary cited it as correcting the "falsification of history" presented in The Longest Day.

The films were noted for the scales of the production: Mira and Antonín J. Liehm cited it alongside Waterloo and War and Peace as foremost among Soviet "monumental films, which, with the expenditure of immense amounts of money, brought... history to the screen." It is still acclaimed for this reason; Lars Karl wrote "it was a gigantic work... The cinematic monumentality was to prove the Soviet Union's might." Denise J. Youngblood called Liberation the "most grandiose Soviet WWII picture".

Soviet critic Rostislav Yurenev "praised the meticulously recreated battle scenes". Der Spiegel lauded Ozerov for portraying the German side "with due consideration" for details. Karl-Heinz Janßen from Die Zeit wrote that Liberation was a "colossal film series... A cenotaph of celluloid."

However, the series was not seen as an artistic achievement. Ozerov declared in the February 1971 issue of the Soviet magazine Art of Cinema that his film should be considered as one of the best dealing with the theme of the Great Patriotic War, along the likes of the 1964 The Alive and the Dead. Two months later, the important author Semion Freilikh completely ignored Liberation when discussing the genre of war films in the same magazine. Denise Youngblood wrote that this was no coincidence. Eventually, the series was never selected to appear on the official lists of the greatest World War II films, which were compiled on every fifth Victory anniversary. Lazar Lazarev wrote in his memoirs that Liberation was a return to the style of the propagandistic films before the Thaw, "a modern version of The Fall of Berlin".

A year after the Last Assault was released, David Robinson called Liberation a "hollow, spectacular, monumental display." The Liehms judged it "entirely sterile". Already in 1974, the British writer Ivan Butler described it as "a stranded whale of a film."

=== Analysis ===
The Second World War was always a crucial topic for Soviet filmmakers. Immediately after the war, propaganda epics like The Fall of Berlin presented it as an heroic, collective effort of the people that was brilliantly led by Stalin. After his death, the Khrushchev Thaw enabled filmmakers to depict the war as a personal, inglorious experience of the individual participants – with films as Ivan's Childhood or Ballad of a Soldier. The Brezhnev administration supported a return to a more conservative style, presenting the war as a noble, ideological struggle once more. In an essay on the series, Dr. Lars Karl wrote: "In this context, Liberation held special importance": he regarded it as ushering the Brezhnev Stagnation into Soviet cinema, during which "a new conservatism and sharpened censure molded the cinematic image of the war into conventional patterns." Mira and Antonin Liehm also noted that with its focus on the politicians and generals rather than ordinary people, it was "almost reminiscent of the 'Artistic Documentary' period" – the era of the Stalinist epics. Even the splitting of the plot to three lines – leaders' meetings, "huge battle scenes" and parts featuring common people – was a return to that style. Lisa A. Kirshenbaum assessed that in comparison to more sincere Great Patriotic War films, like The Ascent or The Cranes Are Flying, the "heroic, if not kitschy" Liberation conformed to the "Cult of the Great Patriotic War".

Stalin's return was another important trait: during the Thaw, in the aftermath of the XX Party Congress and De-Stalinization, Eastern Bloc films rarely depicted Stalin, if at all. Scenes featuring him were edited out from many older pictures. Liberation presented Stalin as the Supreme Commander, his first major appearance on screen since the Secret Speech – a token to the Brezhnev Era softer view of him, Still, his character did not occupy a central role as it had done in the films produced during his reign. Ozerov later claimed that he never included the controversial figure in the script, and had to shoot the Stalin scenes secretly, at night. He told interviewer Victor Matizen that the "State Secretary for Cinematography almost had a seizure when he found out."

Ralf Schenk noted that one detail, which explained its popularity with the East German audience, was the portrayal of the German enemy, which was seen as capable and, to a certain degree, honorable; in earlier Soviet films this was largely not the case. And chiefly, the 20 July Plot conspirators were presented as heroes, providing positive Germans to identify with beside the communist resistance; in East Germany they were always depicted as aristocratic opportunists who turned on Hitler only when their own status was in peril.

Denise J. Youngblood stated that the films – depicting the protagonists as human and imperfect – were still influenced by the Khrushchev Thaw's artistic freedom, writing that: "It is, however, important to stress that Ozerov was far from a 'tool' of war cult propaganda... Liberation is a much better film than critics allowed". German author Christoph Dieckmann wrote that "Despite of all the propaganda, Liberation is an anti-war film, a memento mori to the uncountable lives sacrificed for victory."

=== Historical accuracy ===
The sociologist Lev Gudkov saw the series as a succinct representation of the Soviet official view on the war's history: "The dominant understanding of the war is shown in the film epic Liberation... All other versions only elaborated on this theme." He characterized this view as one that allowed "a number of unpleasant facts" to be "repressed from mass consciousness".

Lars Karl claimed that the Red Army liberated Europe, "and therefore, the USSR had a right to have a say in its matters." He noted that Roosevelt and Churchill are depicted as "paper tigers" who are keen to reach a settlement with Hitler; in the Battle of Berlin, Stalin informs both that he knows of the covert Dulles-Wolff dealings when they assemble in the Yalta Conference, a month before the actual negotiations took place; in reality, the Soviets were notified about them beforehand. Karl added that no mention of the Stalin-Hitler Pact is made. Polish author Łukasz Jasina commented that the Bug River is spoken of as the Polish border already during 1944 – although the USSR annexed the eastern territories of Poland only after the war. Russian historian Boris Sokolov wrote that the film's depiction of Battle of Kursk was "completely false" and the German casualties were exaggerated. Liberation presents the civilian population in Berlin welcoming the Red Army; German author Jörg von Mettke wrote the scene in which the German women flirt with the soldiers "might have happened, but it was mostly otherwise."

Grigory Filaev called the films an "encyclopedia of myths", and claimed that they spread the falsehood according to which Stalin ordered Kiev to be captured before the eve of the 26th Anniversary of the October Revolution. Yakov Dzhugashvili's daughter, Galina, claimed that the phrase "I will not trade a Field Marshal for a soldier", that is strongly associated with Yakov's story, was never uttered by her grandfather and is "just a quote from Liberation". Yakov Dzhugashvili's appearance in The Fire Bulge was anachronistic: he is depicted meeting General Vlasov on 5 July 1943. He died on 14 April 1943.
