= Job von Witzleben (disambiguation) =

Job von Witzleben (1783–1837) was a Prussian Minister of War

Job Witzleben may also refer to:

- Job von Witzleben (historian) (1916–1999), German military officer and historian
- Job von Witzleben (general) (1813–1867), son of the Minister of War

== See also ==
- Witzleben (disambiguation)
