= Młynowo =

Młynowo may refer to the following places:

- Młynowo, Greater Poland Voivodeship (west-central Poland)
- Młynowo, Kętrzyn County in Warmian-Masurian Voivodeship (north Poland)
- Młynowo, Mrągowo County in Warmian-Masurian Voivodeship (north Poland)
