= Viktor Bortsov =

Russian actor (1934–2008)

Viktor Andreyevich Bortsov (Russian: Виктор Андреевич Борцов; June 14, 1934 in Orenburg, USSR – May 20, 2008 in Moscow, Russia) was a Soviet/Russian theatrical and cinema actor. He was a People's Artist of RSFSR.

Bortsov was best known as Savva Ignatyevich in the 1982 film The Pokrovsky Gate.

He died at 73, after a long struggle with intestinal cancer. A civil funeral was held at the Maly Theatre, Moscow on May 23, 2008. He was buried in Troyekurovskoye Cemetery in Moscow.

== Selected filmography ==
- 1970 — Liberation (Russian: Освобождение) as General Grigory Oriol
- 1978 — Aniskin Begins Again (И снова Анискин) as Sidorov, tractor driver
- 1982 — Station for Two (Вокзал для двоих) as drunkard in a restaurant
- 1982 — The Pokrovsky Gate (Покровские ворота) as Savva Ignatyevich
- 1984 — Alone and Unarmed (Один и без оружия) as Dmitry Sergeyevich
- 1986 — Ballad of an Old Gun (Баллада о старом оружии) as Gritsenko
- 1988 — Gardes-Marines, Ahead! (Гардемарины, вперёд!) as Gavrila
- 1991 — Viva Gardes-Marines! (Виват, гардемарины!) as Gavrila
