= Puszczka =

- Village
- Location within Poland
- Coordinates: 53°15′16″N 17°24′13″E
- Country: Poland
- Voivodeship: Greater Poland
- County: Piła
- Gmina: Łobżenica

Puszczka [ˈpuʂt͡ʂka] is a village in the administrative district of Gmina Łobżenica, within Piła County, Greater Poland Voivodeship, in west-central Poland, approximately 11 kilometres (7 mi) east of Łobżenica and 101 km (63 mi) north of the regional capital Poznań.
