= Trzeboń =

Trzeboń may refer to:

- Polish name for Třeboň in the Czech Republic
- Trzeboń, Greater Poland Voivodeship (west-central Poland)
