= Lawrence Wnuk =

Lawrence (Wawrzyniec) Anthony Wnuk, OOnt (August 6, 1908 in Witrogoszcz, German Empire (now Poland) – August 6, 2006 in Windsor, Ontario, Canada) was a Polish Roman Catholic priest and Protonotary Apostolic.

He grew up in a Catholic and patriotic Polish family. In 1928, after completing gymnasium in Nakło nad Notecią, Poland he entered Seminary in Gniezno, where he studied under professors Rev. Kazimierz Rolewski, Rev. Aleksander Żychliński, Father Michał Kozal (beatified martyr from Dachau). He was ordained in 1933 by Cardinal August Hlond and began work as an assistant in parishes in Inowrocław and from 1938 in Gniezno.

When the Second World War erupted in 1939, he was arrested by the Gestapo and sent to Piotrków Trybunalski. On August 15, 1943 he was arrested again and taken to Oświęcim (Auschwitz) concentration camp. There he caught the Typhus and fought for weeks with death.

In June 1944, the Soviet offensive prompted the Germans to evacuate the camp to cover up their atrocities. Together with a couple of thousand of other Poles and Russians he was moved to Buchenwald, then Dachau. After the evacuation of Dachau, with a group of 380 other surviving prisoners he found himself in Kleinmuhlingen, where he was finally freed (a friend of his, stated in a eulogy that he was found barely clinging to life after being tossed for dead by the escaping Germans onto a pile of corpses) by the American Seventh Army on April 29, 1945.

After a period of convalescence he began his pastoral work in the camps for displaced persons in Westphalia, Germany. In 1947 he was appointed chaplain in Allied prison in Werl near Soest. In 1949 Archbishop Józef Gawlina appointed him a chief coordinator for pastoral work in the British zone of occupied Germany.

In 1951 the Church authorities requested that he move to the United States. He worked in the St. Władysław (St. Ladislaus) Parish in Hamtramck in the Archdiocese of Detroit. There he also led the Polish Veterans’ Association.

In 1957 he was transferred to build a church and to establish new Polish Parish (Our Lady of Victory) in Chatham, in the Archdiocese of London, Ontario, Canada. Four years later, in 1961, he took over the pastoral duties in the Holy Trinity Polish Parish in Windsor, Ontario. He worked there for 22 years until his retirement in 1983. Through his efforts in 1965, first Convent of Polish Ursuline Sisters, Congregatio Sororum Ursulinarum a Sacro Corde Iesu Agonizantis, was established in Windsor.

He contributed to numerous initiatives and supported various foundations, stipends at universities, helped religious charities, and helped many persons privately.

In 1977, he founded the Polish Canadian Centre Association of Windsor. A year later, he helped found the Polonia Centre of Windsor, a non-profit charitable organization that conducts cultural activities in the Polish community.

In 1979, he was instrumental in creating the Polonia Park Housing Project that built 342 townhouses and apartments for low-income families in Windsor. In 1986, he once again influenced the construction of 69 apartments for low-income families at the Villa Polonia Housing Project in Windsor.

He was a Prelate Monsignor and in 1985 he received the title of Protonotary Apostolic for Pope John Paul II. In recognition of his achievements, Msgr. Wnuk received numerous citations and awards. These include:

- 1992 the 125th Anniversary of the Confederation of Canada Medal;
- 1994 Order of Polonia Restituta, from the Polish Government;
- Commander's Cross of the Order of Merit of the Polish Republic
- MEDA Charitable Trust — the Exemplary Citizenship Award for religion, from Assumption University;
- 1999 Medal from the University of Nicholas Copernicus, Poland for special care over stipends and financial support of the Dept. of Astronomy;
- 2001 the International Year of Volunteer Certificate of Appreciation;
- 2002 the Golden Jubilee Medal, from Her Majesty Queen Elizabeth II;
- 2005 the Order of the Province of Ontario (awarded in 2004)
- Order of Merit of the Grand Duchy of Luxembourg

... the list is incomplete

24 August 2006 was buried in sanctuary of Saint Urszula Ledóchowska in Pniewy, Poland.
