= Witzleben (disambiguation) =

Witzleben is a German municipality.

Witzleben may also refer to:

- Berlin Witzleben station, since December 2024 named Berlin Messe Nord/ZOB station

== People with the surname ==
- Erwin von Witzleben (1881–1944), German officer and leading conspirator in the 20 July plot
- Job von Witzleben (1783–1837), Prussian lieutenant general, adjutant-general to the king, and minister of war
- Job von Witzleben (historian) (1916–1999), German army officer and a military historian
