= Witrogoszcz-Osada =

- Settlement
- Location within Poland
- Coordinates: 53°17′13″N 17°17′38″E
- Country: Poland
- Voivodeship: Greater Poland
- County: Piła
- Gmina: Łobżenica

Witrogoszcz-Osada [viˈtrɔɡɔʂt͡ʂ ɔˈsada] is a settlement in the administrative district of Gmina Łobżenica, within Piła County, Greater Poland Voivodeship, in west-central Poland.
