= Szczerbin, Greater Poland Voivodeship =

Szczerbin
- Village
- Location within Poland
- Coordinates: 53°14′N 17°15′E
- Country: Poland
- Voivodeship: Greater Poland
- County: Piła
- Gmina: Łobżenica

Szczerbin [ˈʂt͡ʂɛrbin] is a village in the administrative district of Gmina Łobżenica, within Piła County, Greater Poland Voivodeship, in west-central Poland.
