= Witrogoszcz-Kolonia =

- Village
- Location within Poland
- Coordinates: 53°20′19″N 17°19′16″E
- Country: Poland
- Voivodeship: Greater Poland
- County: Piła
- Gmina: Łobżenica

Witrogoszcz-Kolonia [viˈtrɔɡɔʂt͡ʂ kɔˈlɔɲa] is a village in the administrative district of Gmina Łobżenica, within Piła County, Greater Poland Voivodeship, in west-central Poland.
