= Dziunin, Greater Poland Voivodeship =

Dziunin
- Settlement
- Location within Poland
- Coordinates: 53°14′N 17°24′E
- Country: Poland
- Voivodeship: Greater Poland
- County: Piła
- Gmina: Łobżenica

Dziunin [ˈd͡ʑunin] is a settlement in the administrative district of Gmina Łobżenica, within Piła County, Greater Poland Voivodeship, in west-central Poland.
