= Zdroje =

Zdroje may refer to:

- Zdroje, Brodnica County in Kuyavian-Pomeranian Voivodeship (north-central Poland)
- Zdroje, Tuchola County in Kuyavian-Pomeranian Voivodeship (north-central Poland)
- Zdroje, Gmina Czarna Białostocka in Podlaskie Voivodeship (north-east Poland)
- Zdroje, Gmina Supraśl in Podlaskie Voivodeship (north-east Poland)
- Zdroje, Masovian Voivodeship (east-central Poland)
- Zdroje, Piła County in Greater Poland Voivodeship (west-central Poland)
- Zdroje, Szamotuły County in Greater Poland Voivodeship (west-central Poland)
- Zdroje, Warmian-Masurian Voivodeship (north Poland)
- Zdroje, Świdwin County in West Pomeranian Voivodeship (north-west Poland)
- Zdroje, Szczecin
