= Wiktorówko =

- Village
- Location within Poland
- Coordinates: 53°16′7″N 17°12′5″E
- Country: Poland
- Voivodeship: Greater Poland
- County: Piła
- Gmina: Łobżenica
- Population: 890

Wiktorówko [viktɔˈrufkɔ] is a village in the administrative district of Gmina Łobżenica, within Piła County, Greater Poland Voivodeship, in west-central Poland.
