= Ballad of an Old Gun =

1986 film directed by Gennadiy Voronin

- Directed by: Gennadi Voronin
- Written by: Vatslav Mikhalsky
- Produced by: Igor Tolstunov
- Starring: Patimat Khizroyeva; Sergei Skripkin; Aleksandr Demyanenko
- Cinematography: Leonid Litvak
- Edited by: Tamara Krivosheina
- Music by: Anna Ikramova
- Release date: 12 May 1986
- Running time: 86 minutes
- Country: Soviet Union
- Language: Russian

Ballad of an Old Gun (Russian: Баллада о старом оружии, romanized: Ballada o starom oruzhii) is a 1986 Soviet war drama film directed by Gennadi Voronin.

== Plot ==
In a remote mountain village fathers and mothers accompany their sons to the front. According to tradition, the Highlander does not have to give up weapons of their ancestors. Mature Patimat asks lieutenant Zvorykin convey her sons Sultan and Magomed ancient ancestral daggers. He disagrees, afraid to break the charter. But you can not break the habit, so a single mother, taking up arms, she goes in search of his sons.

== Cast ==
- Patimat Khizroyeva as Patimat
- Sergei Skripkin as lieutenant Zvorykin
- Aleksandr Demyanenko as driver Ivanov
- Viktor Bortsov as driver Gritsenko
- Leonid Belozorovich as Kirill Tsirkachev
- Boris Klyuyev as SS officer
- Valentina Klyagina as nurse

== Location ==
Filming took place in Gunib (Dagestan).

== See also ==
- Father of a Soldier (1964)
