= Luchowo, Greater Poland Voivodeship =

Luchowo
- Village
- Location within Poland
- Coordinates: 53°15′40″N 17°16′26″E
- Country: Poland
- Voivodeship: Greater Poland
- County: Piła
- Gmina: Łobżenica
- Population: 680

Luchowo [luˈxɔvɔ] is a village in the administrative district of Gmina Łobżenica, within Piła County, Greater Poland Voivodeship, in west-central Poland.
