= Zawada, Gmina Łobżenica =

Zawada
- Settlement
- Location within Poland
- Coordinates: 53°16′46″N 17°21′2″E
- Country: Poland
- Voivodeship: Greater Poland
- County: Piła
- Gmina: Łobżenica

Zawada [zaˈvada] is a settlement in the administrative district of Gmina Łobżenica, within Piła County, Greater Poland Voivodeship, in west-central Poland.
