= Józefinowo, Piła County =

Józefinowo
- Settlement
- Location within Poland
- Coordinates: 53°16′38″N 17°23′05″E
- Country: Poland
- Voivodeship: Greater Poland
- County: Piła
- Gmina: Łobżenica

Józefinowo [juzɛfiˈnɔvɔ] is a settlement in the administrative district of Gmina Łobżenica, within Piła County, Greater Poland Voivodeship, in west-central Poland.
