= Kunowo, Piła County =

Kunowo
- Village
- Location within Poland
- Coordinates: 53°16′N 17°10′E
- Country: Poland
- Voivodeship: Greater Poland
- County: Piła
- Gmina: Łobżenica

Kunowo [kuˈnɔvɔ] is a village in the administrative district of Gmina Łobżenica, within Piła County, Greater Poland Voivodeship, in west-central Poland.
