= Gmina Łobżenica =

Gmina Łobżenica Łobżenica Commune
- Gmina
- Coat of arms
- Interactive map of Gmina Łobżenica
- Coordinates (Łobżenica): 53°16′N 17°15′E
- Country: Poland
- Voivodeship: Greater Poland
- County: Piła
- Seat: Łobżenica

Area
  - Total: 190.68 km^{2} (73.62 sq mi)

Population (2006)
  - Total: 9,853
  - Density: 51.67/km^{2} (133.8/sq mi)
  - Urban: 3,172
  - Rural: 6,681
- Website: https://www.lobzenica.pl/

Gmina Łobżenica is an urban-rural gmina (administrative district) in Piła County, Greater Poland Voivodeship, in west-central Poland. Its seat is the town of Łobżenica, which lies approximately 37 kilometres (23 mi) east of Piła and 99 km (62 mi) north of the regional capital Poznań.

The gmina covers an area of 190.68 square kilometres (73.6 sq mi), and as of 2006 its total population is 9,853 (out of which the population of Łobżenica amounts to 3,172, and the population of the rural part of the gmina is 6,681).

== Villages ==
Apart from the town of Łobżenica, Gmina Łobżenica contains the villages and settlements of Biegodzin, Chlebno, Dębno, Dziegciarnia, Dziunin, Dźwierszno Małe, Dźwierszno Wielkie, Fanianowo, Ferdynandowo, Izdebki, Józefinowo, Kościerzyn Mały, Kruszki, Kunowo, Liszkowo, Łobżonka, Luchowo, Młynowo, Nowina, Piesno, Puszczka, Rataje, Stebionek, Szczerbin, Topola, Trzeboń, Walentynowo, Wiktorówko, Witrogoszcz, Witrogoszcz-Kolonia, Witrogoszcz-Osada, Zawada and Zdroje.

== Neighbouring gminas ==
Gmina Łobżenica is bordered by the gminas of Mrocza, Sadki, Więcbork, Wyrzysk, Wysoka and Złotów.
