= Johannes Maccovius =

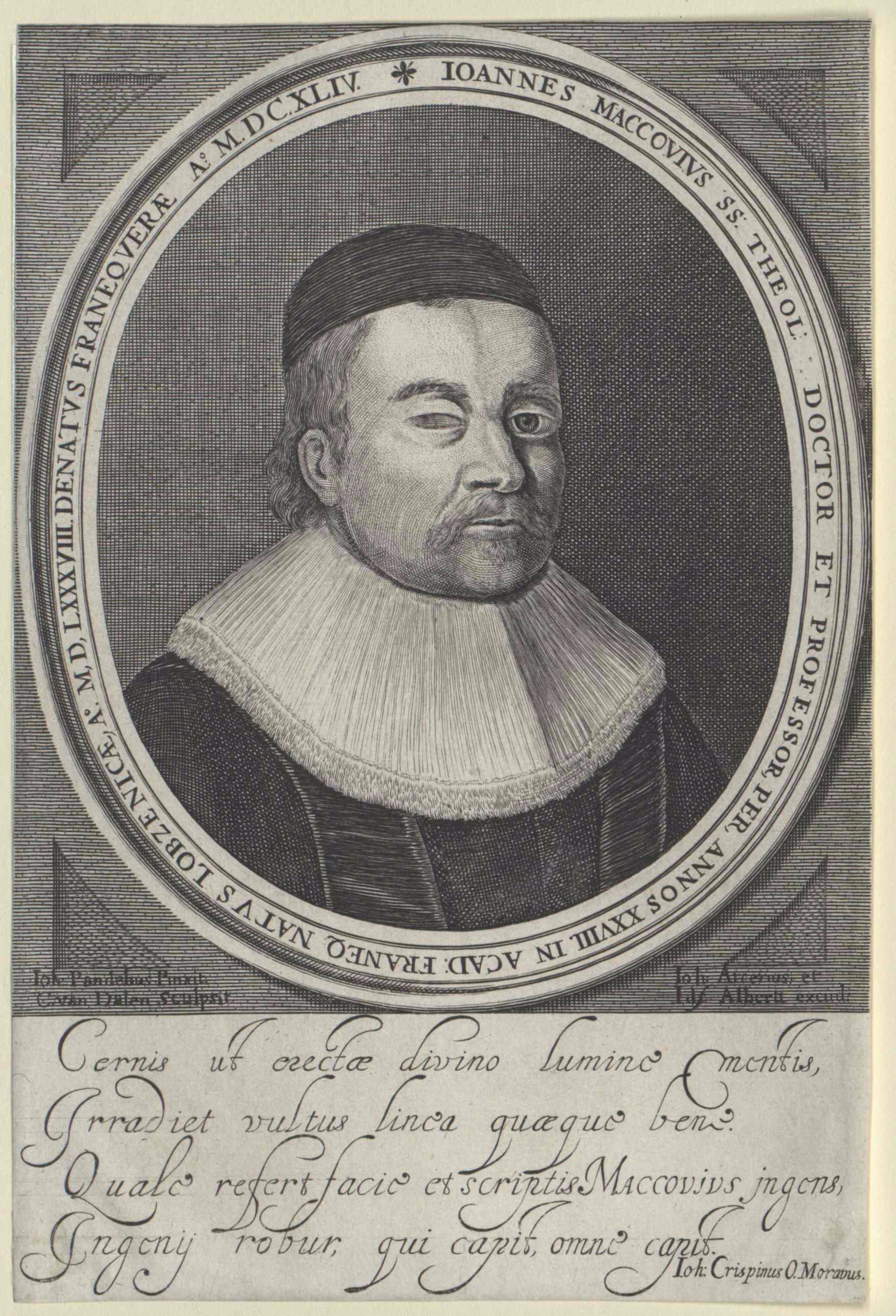

Johannes Maccovius (1588 – 24 June 1644), also known as Jan Makowski, was a Polish Reformed theologian.

== Early travels and personal life ==
Makowski was born in Lobzenica, Poland. After visiting various universities (1607 in Danzig, 1610 in Marburg, 1611 in Heidelberg) and as the tutor of young Polish nobles, holding disputations with Jesuits and Socinians, Maccovius entered the University of Franeker in the Netherlands, in 1613. There he became privat-docent in 1614 and professor of theology in 1615. In later years, the fame of Maccovius attracted many students to Franeker, where he spent the rest of his life.

The first of his three wives was Antje van Uylenburgh, a sister of painter Rembrandt's wife Saskia van Uylenburgh, who, around the time she and Rembrandt married in 1634, helped him out after Antje's death.

== Doctrine ==
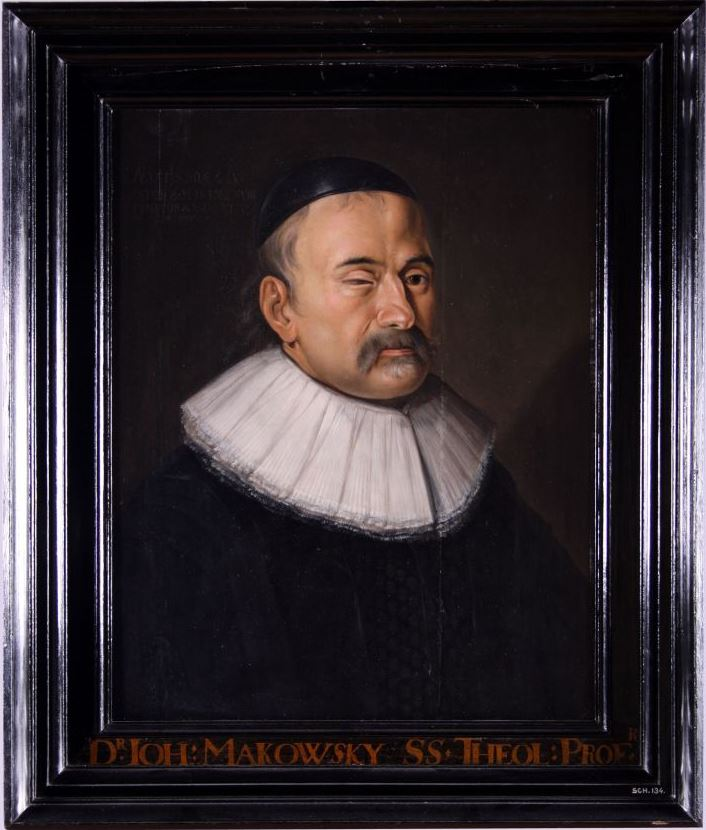
Maccovius (by Johannes Pandelius)

Theologically, Maccovius was a Calvinist, of the supralapsarian school, and possessed theses of a corresponding nature, defended in 1616 by one of his pupils, involved him in a controversy with his colleague Sibrandus Lubbertus which was settled only by the Synod of Dort in 1619. The synod, while neither approving or condemning his supralapsarianism, acquitted Maccovius of the charges of heresy brought against him, but advised him to be more cautious and peaceable.

Nevertheless, he became involved in another controversy at Dort with his subsequent colleague William Ames by asserting that all things that must be believed are not necessarily true, that no impulse toward regeneration and effecting it exists in the unregenerate, and that Christ is the object of faith because of whom, but not in whom, man must believe.

Maccovius' theory of Scripture was very free, and he distinguished sharply between scholarship and beliefs essential to salvation.

== Chief works ==
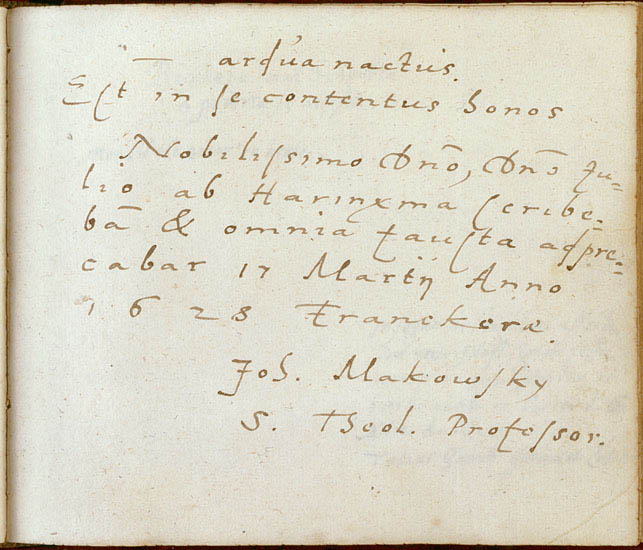
Handwriting of Maccovius (1628)

- Collegia theologica. Amsterdam, 1623.
- Maccovius redivivus sive manuscripta euis typis exscripta. Franeker, 1647, published posthumously.
- Loci communes theologici. Franeker, 1650.
- Distinctiones et regulae theologicae ac philosophicae. Franeker 1652, 1656.
- Opuscula philosophica. Amsterdam, 1660.

== Translations ==
- W. J. van Asselt, M.D. Bell, and R. Ferwerda, ed. and trans. Scholastic Discourse: Johannes Maccovius (1588–1644) on Theological and Philosophical Distinctions and Rules. Publications of the Institute for Reformation Research. Apeldoorn: Instituut voor Reformatieonderzoek, 2009. (Translation of Distinctiones et regulae theologicae ac philosophicae)
