= Rataje, Piła County =

Rataje
- Village
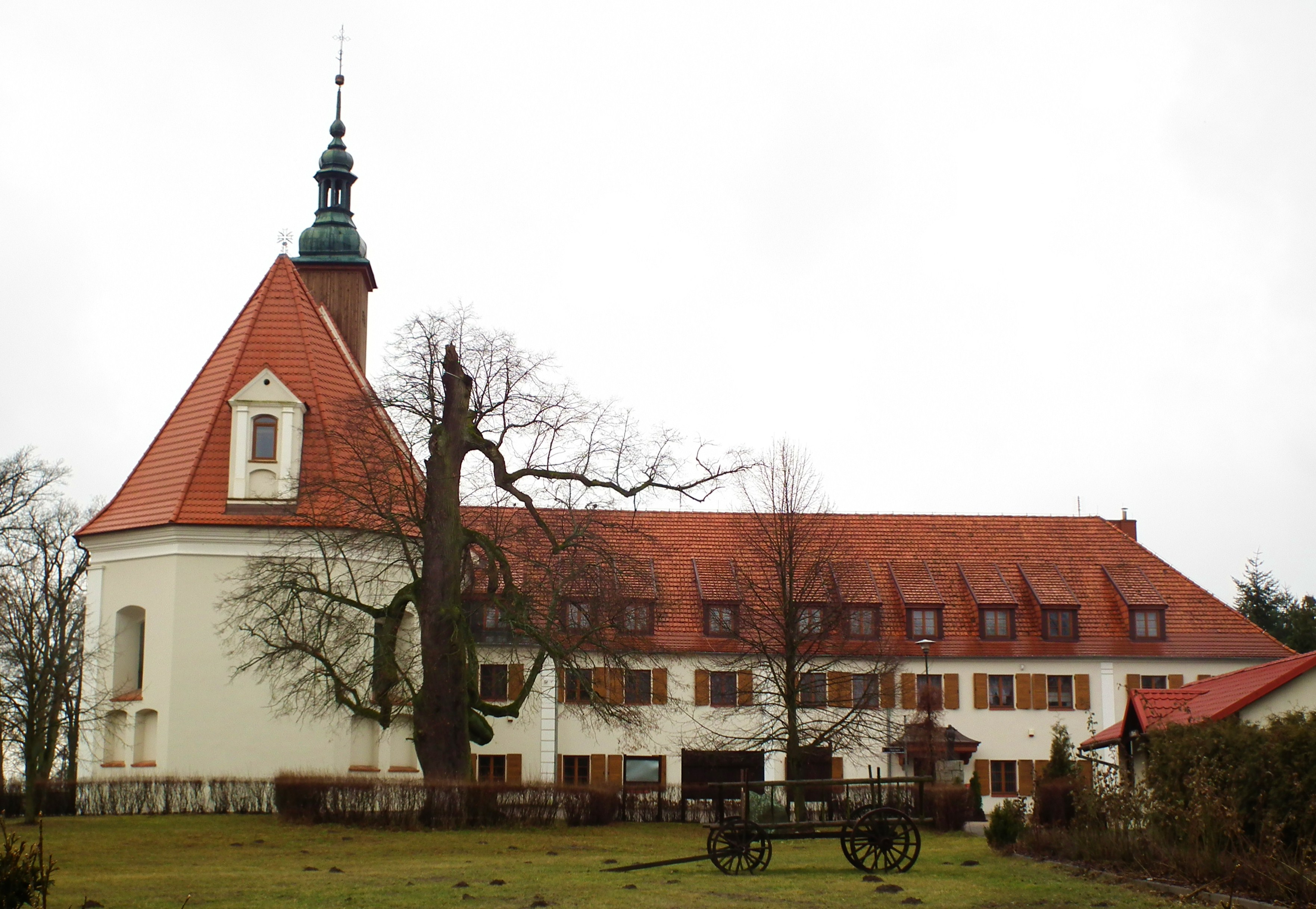
- Sanctuary in Górka Klasztorna

- Location within Poland
- Coordinates: 53°15′34″N 17°14′39″E
- Country: Poland
- Voivodeship: Greater Poland
- County: Piła
- Gmina: Łobżenica
- Time zone: UTC+1 (CET)
  - Summer (DST): UTC+2 (CEST)
- Vehicle registration: PP

Rataje [raˈtajɛ] is a village in the administrative district of Gmina Łobżenica, within Piła County, Greater Poland Voivodeship, in west-central Poland.

The landmark Basilica and Sanctuary of the Immaculate Conception of Mary and Monastery of the Missionaries of the Holy Family is located in Górka Klasztorna in the northern outskirts of the village. It is a Catholic pilgrimage site.

== History ==
During the German occupation of Poland (World War II), the monastery in Górka Klasztorna was the site of a massacre of over 120 Poles from nearby towns and villages, perpetrated by the Germans in 1939 as part of the Intelligenzaktion. The victims were either shot in the back of the head or shot with a machine gun while lying on the ground.
