= Biegodzin =

- Settlement
- Location within Poland
- Coordinates: 53°19′57″N 17°20′18″E
- Country: Poland
- Voivodeship: Greater Poland
- County: Piła
- Gmina: Łobżenica

Biegodzin [bjɛˈɡɔd͡ʑin] is a settlement in the administrative district of Gmina Łobżenica, within Piła County, Greater Poland Voivodeship, in west-central Poland.
