= Wilhelm Arndt =

German historian (1838–1895)

Wilhelm Ferdinand Arndt (27 September 1838, Lobsens, Posen, Prussia – 10 January 1895) was a German historian.

== Biography ==
He graduated from the University of Göttingen (PhD 1861) and became connected with the University of Leipzig (privatdozent, 1875/76; associate professor of auxiliary sciences of history, 1876–94).

== Works ==
For many years he was a collaborator on the Monumenta Germaniæ Historica (1862–75).

His chief works are:

- Kleine Denkmäler aus der Merowingerzeit (“Small monuments from Merovingian times,” 1874)
- Schrifttafeln zur Erlernung der lateinischen Paläographie (“Tables of characters for the study of Latin paleography,” 1874, 3d ed., 1898)
