= Kruszki, Greater Poland Voivodeship =

Kruszki
- Village
- Location within Poland
- Coordinates: 53°13′54″N 17°11′28″E
- Country: Poland
- Voivodeship: Greater Poland
- County: Piła
- Gmina: Łobżenica
- Population: 260

Kruszki [ˈkruʂki] is a village in the administrative district of Gmina Łobżenica, within Piła County, Greater Poland Voivodeship, in west-central Poland.
