= Zbigniew Załuski =

Polish officer, writer and politician

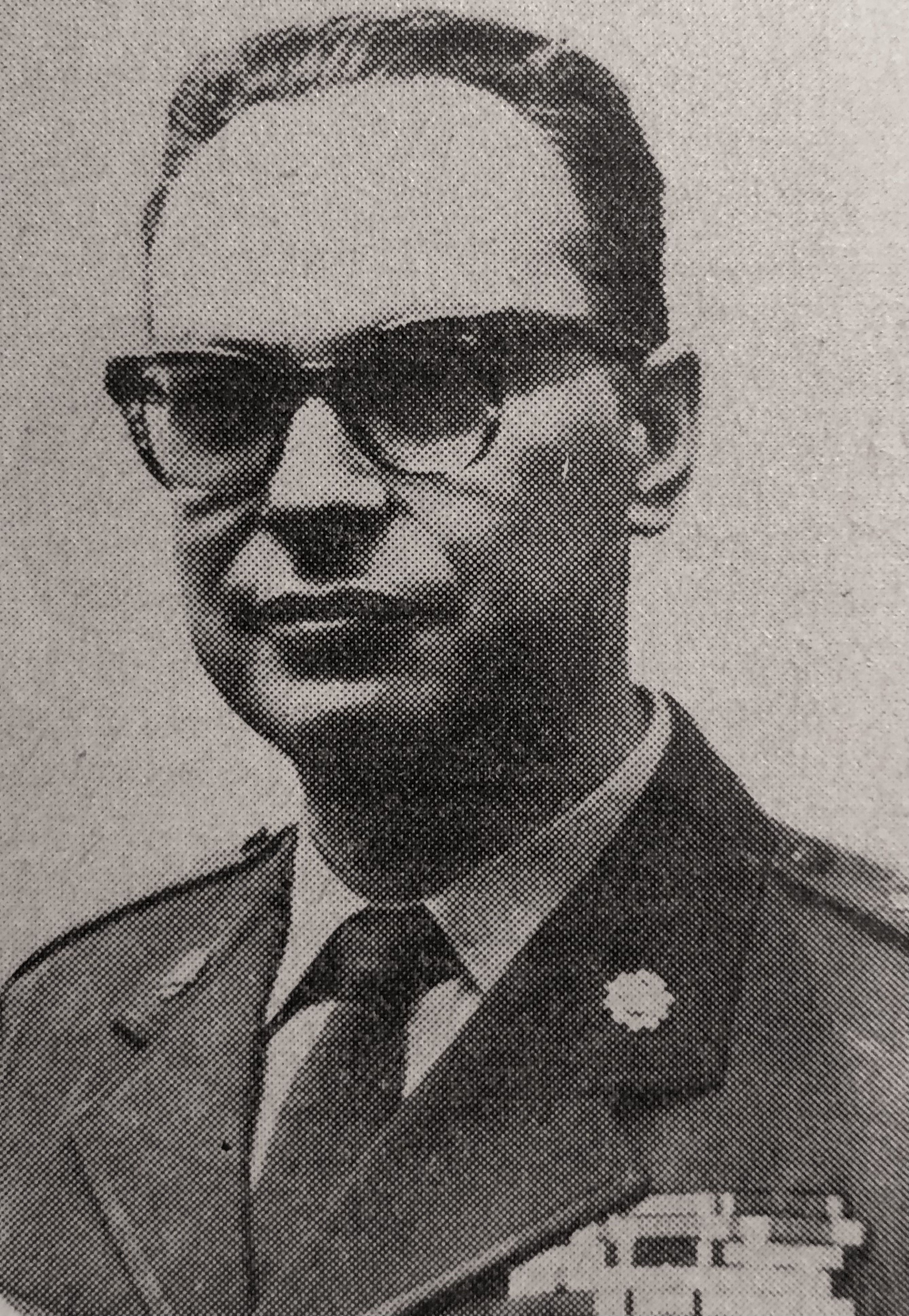

Personal details
- Born: 31 July 1926 Kivertsi, Second Polish Republic
- Died: 5 March 1978 (aged 51) Warsaw, Polish People's Republic
- Party: PZPR
- Occupation: Politician, military officer, writer
- Awards

Military service
- Allegiance: Polish People's Republic
- Branch/service: Polish People's Army
- Rank: Pułkownik (Colonel)
- Unit: 3rd Pomeranian Infantry Division; Main Political Directorate of the Polish Army
- Commands: Deputy Company Commanders for Political Affairs; Deputy Battalion Commanders for Political Affairs

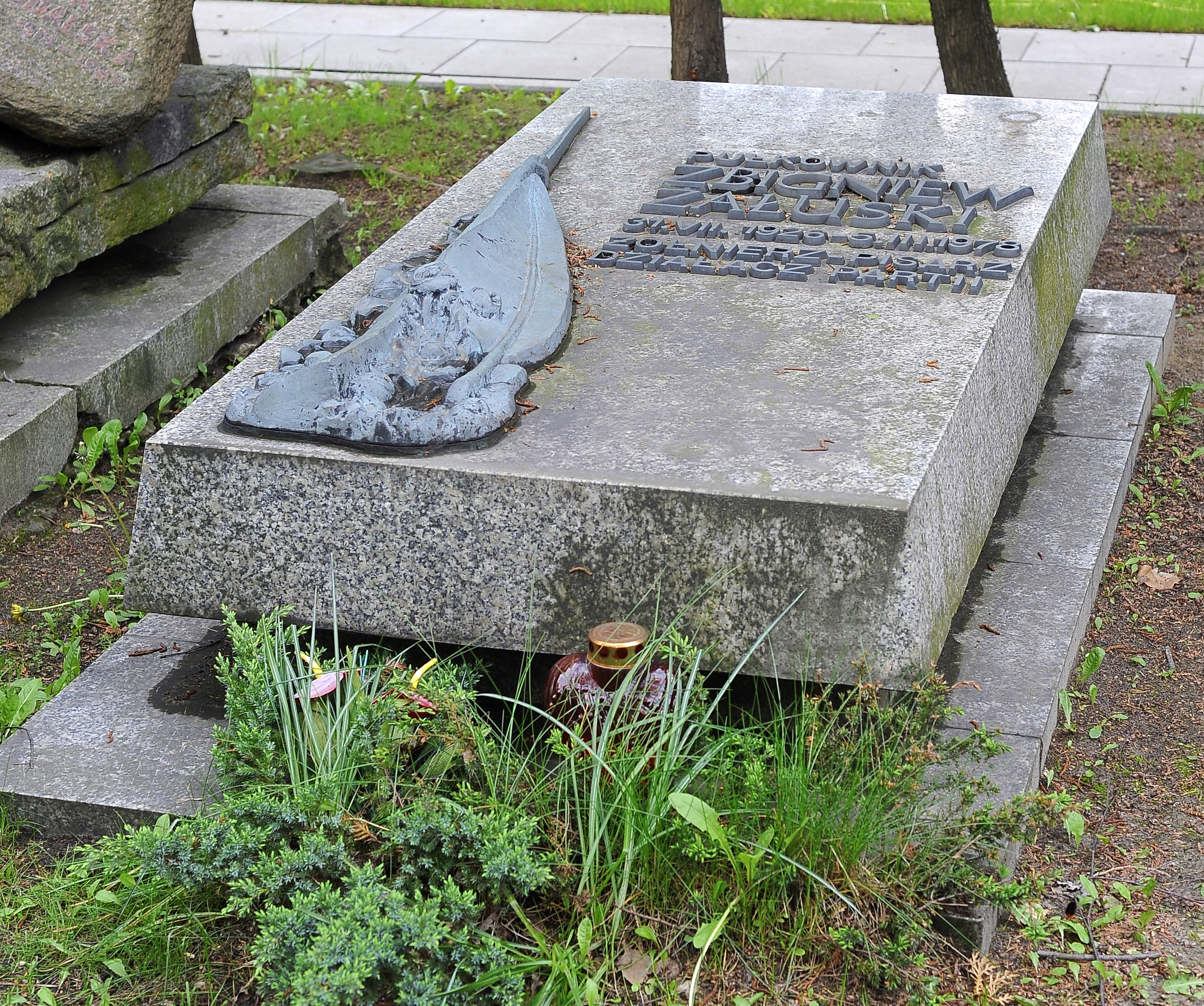
Zbigniew Załuski's grave.

Zbigniew Załuski (31 July 1926 in Kivertsi, Second Polish Republic – 5 March 1978 in Warsaw, People's Republic of Poland) was a Polish army officer, writer and Member of Parliament.

== Life and military career ==
A native of the Wołyń Voivodeship, he was exiled to Kazakhstan in 1940, soon after the Soviet invasion. After joining the Polish People's Army in 1944, he participated in the Battles for Kolberg and Berlin. Załuski joined the Polish Workers' Party and attended the Academy for Political Education Officers, eventually reaching the rank of Colonel as a political officer.

He had a long journalistic career, mainly as an editor in the magazine Wojsko Ludowe (People's Army) and has written several books dealing with military history and Polish history. Załuski was also a screenwriter and a film consultant.

In 1969 he was elected member of the Sejm for the Polish United Workers' Party (PZPR) and continued in the role until his death. In 1974 he joined the administrative board of the Polish–Soviet Friendship Society. Załuski also served as the chief of the PZPR cell in the Polish Writers' Union, until his death from a heart attack.

== Books ==
- The Polish Seven Deadly Sins (Siedem polskich grzechów głównych).
- Polish Army -Loyal Guards of the Homeland (Wojsko polskie – ojczyzny wierna straż).
- Poles on the fronts of the Second World War (Polacy na frontach II wojny światowej).
- The Year Forty Four (Czterdziesty czwarty).
- The End, 1945 (Finał 1945).
- Pass into History (Przepustka do historii).

== Filmography ==
- Then There Was Silence (Potem nastąpi cisza) - 1965.
- Direction: Berlin (Kierunek Berlin) - 1968.
- Last Days (Ostatnie Dni) - 1969.
- Liberation - 1969-71.
- Legend (Legenda) - 1970.
- Victory (Zwycięstwo) - 1974.
- Soldiers of Freedom - 1977.

== Awards and decorations ==
- Order of the Banner of Labour, 1st Class (1976)
- Order of the Banner of Labour, 2nd Class
- Commander's Cross with Star of Order of Polonia Restituta (posthumously)
- Knight's Cross of the Order of Polonia Restituta
- Gold Cross of Merit
- Cross of Valour (three times)
- Medal of the 30th Anniversary of People's Poland
- Medal for Oder, Neisse and Baltic
- Medal of Victory and Freedom 1945
- Gold Medal of the Armed Forces in the Service of the Fatherland
- Silver Medal of the Armed Forces in the Service of the Fatherland
- Bronze Medal of the Armed Forces in the Service of the Fatherland
- Medal of the 10th Anniversary of People's Poland
- Medal for Participation in the Battle of Berlin
- Gold Medal of Merit for National Defence
- Silver Medal of Merit for National Defence
- Bronze Medal of Merit for National Defence
- Medal "For the Victory over Germany in the Great Patriotic War 1941–1945" (USSR)
- Medal "For the Capture of Berlin" (USSR)
