= Kościerzyn Mały =

- Village
- Location within Poland
- Coordinates: 53°14′N 17°16′E
- Country: Poland
- Voivodeship: Greater Poland
- County: Piła
- Gmina: Łobżenica

Kościerzyn Mały (Polish pronunciation: [kɔɕˈtɕɛʐɨn ˈmawɨ]) is a village in the administrative district of Gmina Łobżenica, within Piła County, Greater Poland Voivodeship, in west-central Poland.
