= Dźwierszno Małe =

- Village
- Location within Poland
- Coordinates: 53°19′N 17°21′E
- Country: Poland
- Voivodeship: Greater Poland
- County: Piła
- Gmina: Łobżenica

Dźwierszno Małe [ˈd͡ʑvjɛrʂnɔ ˈmawɛ] is a village in the administrative district of Gmina Łobżenica, within Piła County, Greater Poland Voivodeship, in west-central Poland.
