= Ferdynandowo =

- Village
- Location within Poland
- Coordinates: 53°15′54″N 17°21′30″E
- Country: Poland
- Voivodeship: Greater Poland
- County: Piła
- Gmina: Łobżenica

Ferdynandowo [fɛrdɨnanˈdɔvɔ] is a village in the administrative district of Gmina Łobżenica, within Piła County, Greater Poland Voivodeship, in west-central Poland.
