= Stepan Neustroev =

Stepan Andreevich Neustroev
- Степан Андреевич Неустроев
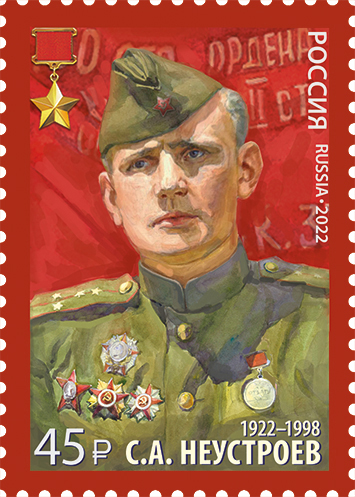
- Neustroev on a 2022 stamp of Russia
- Born: 12 August 1922; Talitsa, Perm Governorate, Soviet Union
- Died: 26 February 1998 (aged 75); Sevastopol, Ukraine
- Military career
- Allegiance: Soviet Union
- Branch: Red Army (1941 – 1948); Internal Troops (1957 – 1962)
- Rank: Colonel
- Conflicts: World War II
- Awards: Hero of the Soviet Union

Stepan Andreevich Neustroev (Russian: Степан Андреевич Неустроев; 12 August 1922 – 26 February 1998) was a Soviet officer, commander of the 1st Battalion in the 756th Regiment of the 150th Rifle Division. His unit was the first to storm the Reichstag.

At a young age, Neustroev worked in the local mine as a mechanic. At June 1941, shortly before the war with Germany, he was conscripted and sent to the Cherkasy Infantry School. Lieutenant Neustroev was dispatched to the front on November, joining the 166th Infantry Division. He was severely wounded in a battle near Gzhatsk. He was wounded again in August 1942 and spent several months in hospital. At April 1943, Captain Neustroev was appointed commander of the 1st Battalion in the 756th Regiment, a post he held to the end of the war. The Battalion took part in the fighting for Belarus, Poland and the Baltics.

On 22 April 1945, the Battalion reached Berlin. On 30 April, at noon, Neustroev's men stormed the Reichstag, breaking through the main entrance and clearing the building. The following day, roughly at 03:00, his deputy for political affairs, Lieutenant Alexei Berest, together with two scouts—Mikhail Yegorov and Meliton Kantaria—raised the Victory Banner atop the Reichstag, next to Wilhelm I's statue.

On 8 May 1946, Neustroev was awarded the title Hero of the Soviet Union (Medal no. 6971). He retired from the army at 1953, holding the rank of lieutenant colonel. From 1957 to 1962, he served in the Internal troops, holding his old rank. He was stationed at Novouralsk.
