= Witrogoszcz =

- Village
- Location within Poland
- Coordinates: 53°18′22″N 17°18′16″E
- Country: Poland
- Voivodeship: Greater Poland
- County: Piła
- Gmina: Łobżenica
- Population: 530

Witrogoszcz [viˈtrɔɡɔʂt͡ʂ] is a village in the administrative district of Gmina Łobżenica, within Piła County, Greater Poland Voivodeship, in west-central Poland.
