= Sergey Sinyakov =

Russian-Soviet Air Force general (1899–1983)

Sergei Siniakov
- Born: 1899; Tver Oblast, Russian Empire
- Died: 1983 (aged 83–84); Moscow, Soviet Union
- Military career
- Allegiance: Soviet Union
- Rank: Lieutenant-General
- Conflicts: Battles of Khalkhin Gol; World War II
- Awards: Order of Lenin (2)

Sergei Pavlovich Siniakov (Russian: Сергей Павлович Синяков; 1899–1983) was a Soviet Air Force general.

== Biography ==
A son of a country priest, Siniakov went to study in the Moscow State University. He joined the Red Army during the Civil War. In 1925 he attended a course for senior cavalry commanders in the Leningrad Cavalry School, but eventually was transferred to the Air Force. He graduated from the Frunze Academy, granted the rank of Combrig in 1935, and was himself appointed commander of the Orenburg Military Flight School in 1937. Later he took part in the Battle of Khalkin-Gol and was Chief of the Air Staff in the Baltic Military District. In June 1940 Siniakov was promoted to Major General of the Aviation. Even before the Second World War he was twice awarded the Order of Lenin for his contribution to the Air Force. He served in the Air Department of the General Staff when Germany invaded the Soviet Union.

In May 1942 Siniakov was sent to investigate the Soviet Air Force's failures in the Battle of the Crimea; after two weeks he was assigned as the Chief of Staff to the new 5th Air Army, on June 3, and ordered to organize the aerial support for the Red Army in the Battle of the Caucasus. He remained in office until 1 July 1943, when he was transferred to Rostov-on-Don on Marshal Novikov's orders. Siniakov continued to serve in the Air Force throughout the war, and was promoted to Lieutenant General on 1944. He remained in the Air Force Staff after it ended, and later retired without further promotions.
