= Zdrój =

Zdrój (meaning "spring, spa" in Polish) may refer to the following places:

- Zdrój, Greater Poland Voivodeship (west-central Poland)
- Zdrój, Warmian-Masurian Voivodeship (north Poland)
