= Job von Witzleben (historian) =

German historian and army officer

- Born: August 4, 1916; Copitz, Kingdom of Saxony, German Empire
- Died: 1999; Potsdam, Germany
- Military career
- Allegiance: Nazi Germany (1939–1945) (Soviet Union) Soviet occupation zone in Germany (1948); East Germany (1952–1972)
- Service years: 1939–1972
- Rank: Oberst
- Conflicts: World War II
- Awards: German Cross in Gold; Heinrich Greif Prize; Friedrich Engels Prize; Patriotic Order of Merit in Gold

Job-Wilhelm Henning Dietrich von Witzleben (4 August 1916 – 1999) was a German army officer and a military historian.

== Biography ==
=== Early life ===
Born in Saxony to the old noble family of von Witzleben, he was a descendant of the Prussian general Job von Witzleben (1783–1837) and grand-nephew to Erwin von Witzleben. He was a member of the Hitlerjugend, holding the rank of Gefolgschaftsführer. On 1 February 1935, he joined the Nazi Party (membership number: 3590830).

=== World War II ===
During the Second World War, Witzleben served in the Wehrmacht. After being commissioned as a lieutenant, he was assigned to an anti-aircraft battery. Afterwards, while stationed in the 192. Grenadier Regiment of the 56th Infantry Division with the rank of a captain, Witzleben was awarded the German Cross in Gold on 24 April 1943. In autumn 1943, he returned from the Eastern Front to be trained for General Staff duty in the Prussian War Academy. Soon after his arrival, he visited his uncle, Field Marshal von Witzleben, who notified him of his intention to remove Adolf Hitler by force. The younger Witzleben was promoted to the rank of major and posted in the General Staff.

Job von Witzleben claimed that he was not personally involved in the 20 July Plot and that he was not made privy to its planning. Yet, under the new Sippenhaft laws and after his uncle was executed, he was interrogated by the Gestapo. Though nothing came of the investigation, he was temporarily discharged from the Wehrmacht. He was then recalled and relegated back to the Eastern Front; Witzleben told an interviewer that he was expected to "prove himself once more." He was appointed as First Staff Officer, a role roughly equivalent to that of an operations officer, of the 69th Infantry Division on 26 February 1945. The division, with the rest of Army Group North, was already besieged by the Red Army in the city of Königsberg.

In early April, the corps' chief of staff informed Witzleben that he is to be flown out of the pocket and face court-martial in Vienna, that would probably result in an execution. Witzleben ordered a radio operator to contact the Soviets. On 9 April, he met with a Soviet delegation which crossed the lines and defected to the Red Army. On the very same day, the remains of the division surrendered. He was held in relatively comfortable condition while in captivity.

=== Barracked People's Police ===
Witzleben spent three years in the POW Camp no. 27 near Krasnogorsk. In June 1945, he witnessed the arrival of Field Marshal Ferdinand Schörner in the camp, after he was handed over by the American authorities. A group of some 200 inmates attempted to lynch Schörner, but they were held at bay by the guards. While in the camp, Witzleben joined the League of German Officers, that was disbanded in November 1945.

In 1948, Witzleben was offered the chance to join the German Administration of the Interior that was created by the authorities in the Soviet occupation zone. He was assigned to the Main Directory of Training with the rank of a colonel, and posted to the Kochstedt Academy as an instructor, where he trained recruits for what would become the Barracked People's Police (KVP). Later, he became a member of the Socialist Unity Party of Germany.

After the KVP was formally established in July 1952, Witzleben joined it. On 15 September 1953 he became chief of staff for the newly formed Territorial Command North in Pasewalk.

=== National People's Army ===
On 1 March 1956, the National People's Army was officially created, and the command was renamed Military Area V. Witzleben remained in his office, with the same rank (although now as a member of the NVA).

Witzleben was considered to be unreliable by the Stasi, due to his 'bourgeois background' and aristocratic descent. Many other former Wehrmacht officers were purged from the East German armed services already in the late 1940s. On 12 December 1957 he was dismissed from Military Area V, and on 15 March 1958 he was reassigned to the Potsdam Military History Institute as a fellow researcher. He was not dismissed from the army, and retained his rank as a colonel.

One of his first actions as a military historian was to attack Adolf Heusinger, claiming he betrayed the 20 July plotters. He also worked as a military consultant for several films: his participation in the production of the documentary Himmelsstürmer won him the Heinrich Greif Prize, 2nd degree, on 17 May 1966. He served in the same position in the 1970 adventure film Meine Stunde Null, scripted by Jurek Becker, and consulted director Yuri Ozerov during the making of his World War II epic Liberation. He continued to work with Ozerov in Soldiers of Freedom, Battle of Moscow and Stalingrad.

Witzleben was married to Anka von Witzleben and resided in a villa in Potsdam that once belonged to Wilhelm Kempff. In 1970, he received the Friedrich Engels Prize, 3rd degree. On 31 December 1972 he retired from the National People's Army without further promotions.

== Selected works ==
- Die Bundeswehr – ein gefährliches, aber perspektivloses Instrument des westdeutschen Imperialismus und Militarismus. Institut für deutsche Militärgeschichte (1965). ASIN B003TVXQ7G.
- Bundeswehr Armee der Revanche: Probleme der Entwicklung der Bundeswehr. Deutscher Militärverlag (1965). ASIN B000Z3SKOK. [Written in collective, with Witzleben as director and chief editor].
- Der Einsatz der HVA-Kräfte zur Sicherung der III. Weltfestspiele der Jugend und Studenten im Sommer 1951 in Berlin. Institut für deutsche Militärgeschichte (1970).
- Die Verschwörung vom 20. Juli 1944 — keine nationale Alternative für das deutsches Volk. Published in Das Nationalkomitee "Freies Deutschland" und seine militärpolitische Bedeutung. Institut für deutsche Militärgeschichte (1963).
- Stauffenberg und das Nationalkomitee Freies Deutschland. Ein verdrängtes Kapitel deutschen Widerstandes. Dokumentation Berlin (1990).
