= Młynowo, Greater Poland Voivodeship =

Młynowo
- Settlement
- Location within Poland
- Coordinates: 53°19′22″N 17°16′45″E
- Country: Poland
- Voivodeship: Greater Poland
- County: Piła
- Gmina: Łobżenica

Młynowo [mwɨˈnɔvɔ] is a settlement in the administrative district of Gmina Łobżenica, within Piła County, Greater Poland Voivodeship, in west-central Poland.
