= Zdroje, Piła County =

Zdroje
- Settlement
- Location within Poland
- Coordinates: 53°14′53″N 17°24′19″E
- Country: Poland
- Voivodeship: Greater Poland
- County: Piła
- Gmina: Łobżenica

Zdroje [ˈzdrɔjɛ] is a settlement in the administrative district of Gmina Łobżenica, within Piła County, Greater Poland Voivodeship, in west-central Poland.
