= Łobżenica =

Town in Greater Poland Voivodeship, Poland

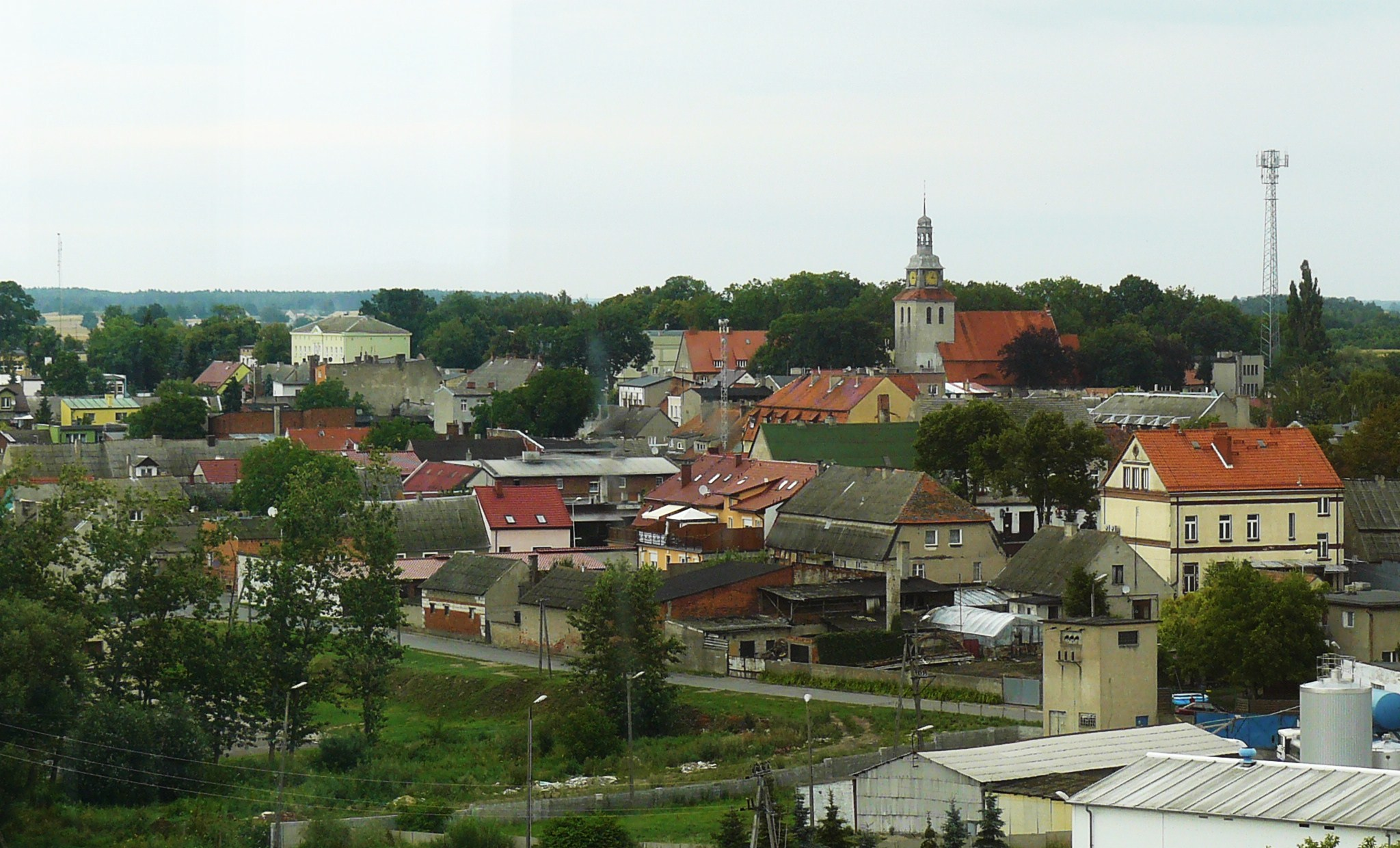
- Łobżenica as seen from the water tower

- Flag Coat of arms

- Location within Poland
- Coordinates: 53°16′N 17°15′E
- Country: Poland
- Voivodeship: Greater Poland
- County: Piła
- Gmina: Łobżenica
- Town rights: before 1438

Area
  - Total: 3.25 km^{2} (1.25 sq mi)
- Elevation: 100 m (330 ft)

Population (2010)
  - Total: 3,172
  - Density: 976/km^{2} (2,530/sq mi)
- Time zone: UTC+1 (CET)
  - Summer (DST): UTC+2 (CEST)
- Postal code: 89-310
- Vehicle registration: PP
- Website: http://www.lobzenica.pl

Łobżenica ([wɔbʐɛˈɲit͡sa]; German: Lobsens; Hebrew: לובזניצ'ה) is a town in Piła County, Greater Poland Voivodeship, in north-central Poland, with 3,172 inhabitants (2010).

== History ==
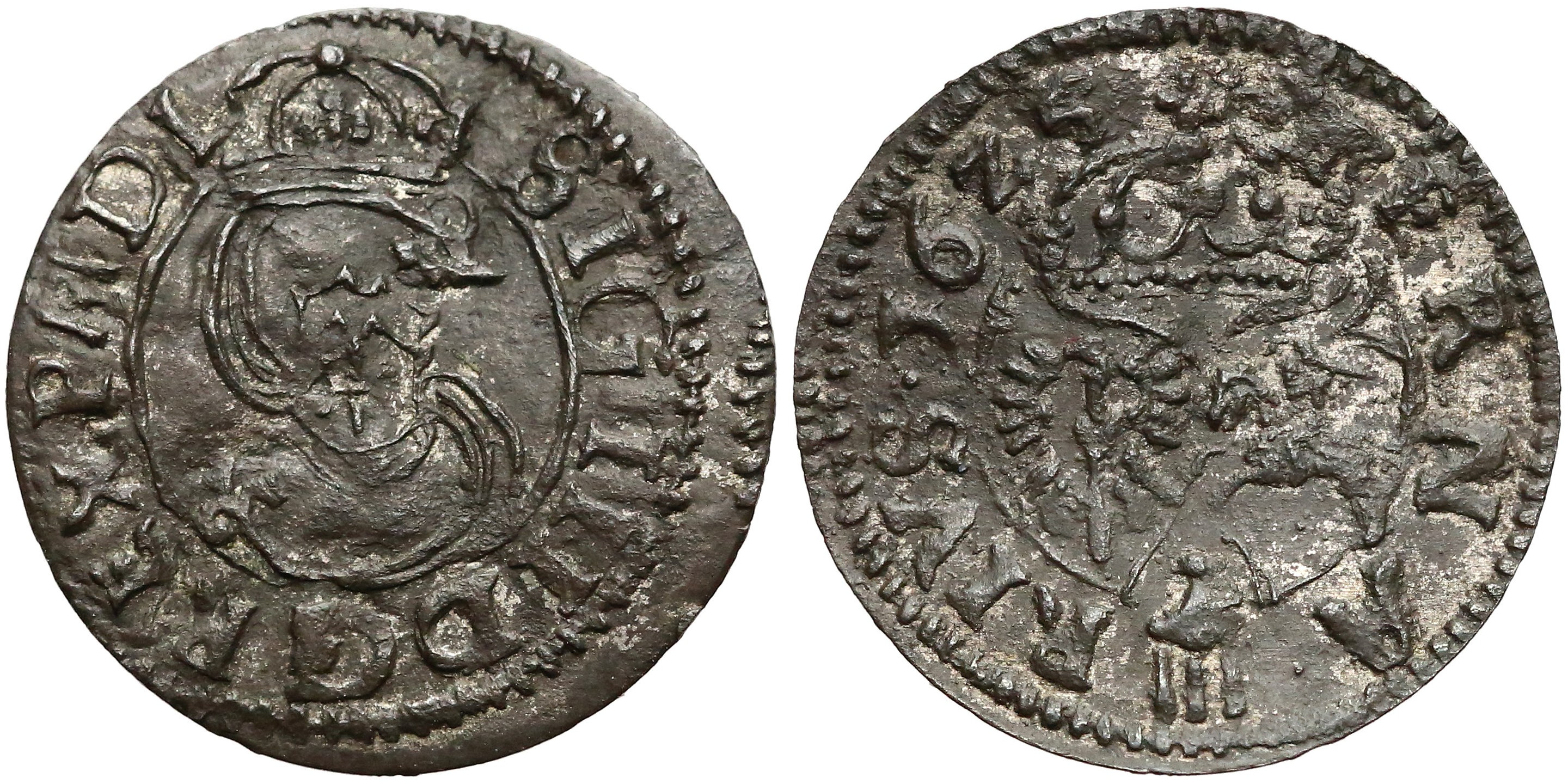
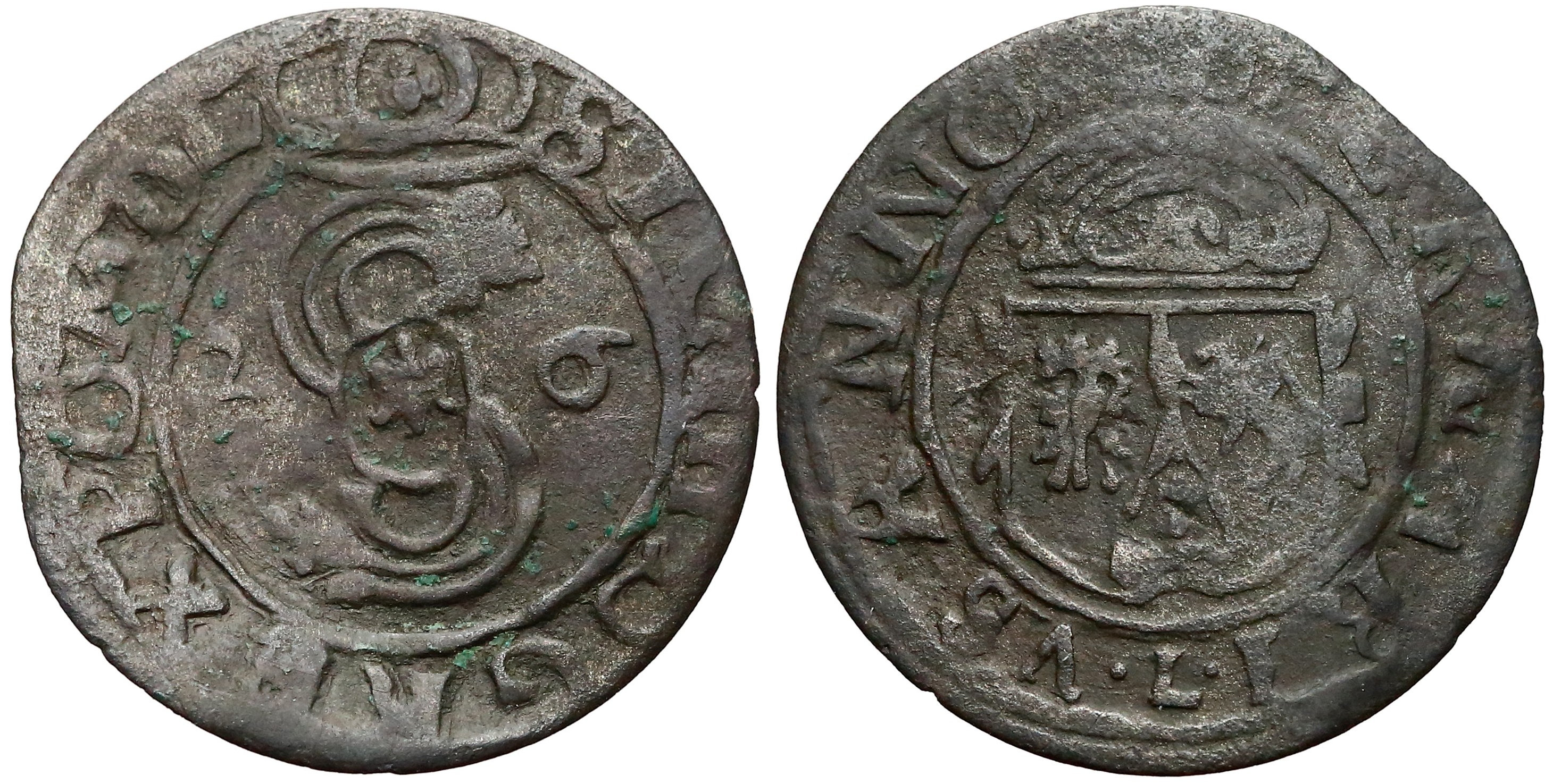
17th-century Polish coins from the Łobżenica mint

Łobżenica dates back to the 11th century. It prospered due to its location between Gdańsk Pomerania and central Poland. It was granted town rights before 1438, most likely in the 14th century by King Ladislaus the Short or Casimir III the Great of the Piast dynasty. Łobżenica was a private town located in the Nakło County in the Kalisz Voivodeship in the Greater Poland Province of the Kingdom of Poland. It was ravaged by the Teutonic Knights in 1431 and 1457. The town prospered thanks to crafts, brewing and trade. Local merchants participated in trade with large Polish cities of Poznań, Bydgoszcz, Toruń and Gdańsk, as well as other nearby towns. In 1606, Scottish merchants settled in the town. In the years 1612-1630 a mint operated in Łobżenica. In the 17th century, Łobżenica became a Reformation center under the patronage of the Grudziński family.

After the late 18th century Partitions of Poland, the town was annexed by Prussia. It was reintegrated into Poland, soon after the country regained independence in 1918. After the invasion of Poland, which started World War II, the Germans carried out mass arrests and executions among local Poles in 1939, mainly as part of the Intelligenzaktion, murdering about 200 people in October and November 1939 in the Łobżenica massacre.

The town had a population of 467 Jews in 1881 and 77 Jews in 1921.

== Demographics ==
Historical population

| Year | Pop. | ±% |
|---|---|---|
| 1843 | 2,751 | — |
| 1871 | 2,712 | −1.4% |
| 1880 | 2,579 | −4.9% |
| 1890 | 2,251 | −12.7% |
| 1900 | 2,238 | −0.6% |
| 1910 | 2,376 | +6.2% |

| Year | Pop. | ±% |
|---|---|---|
| 1921 | 1,904 | −19.9% |
| 1931 | 2,294 | +20.5% |
| 1939 | 2,506 | +9.2% |
| 1950 | 1,872 | −25.3% |
| 1960 | 2,542 | +35.8% |
| 2010 | 3,043 | +19.7% |

== Sports ==
The local football team is Pogoń Łobżenica, which competes in the lower leagues.

== Notable people ==
- Johannes Maccovius (1588–1644), Polish Reformed theologian
- Jan Rymarkiewicz (1811–1889), Polish historian, teacher and insurgent
- Wilhelm Arndt (1838-1895), German historian
- Władysław Seyda (1863–1939), Polish lawyer and politician, minister, First President of the Supreme Court of Poland
