= Zdrojewo =

Village in Kociewie

- Village
- Interactive map of Zdrojewo
- Country: Poland
- Voivodeship: Kuyavian–Pomeranian
- County: Świecie
- Gmina: Nowe

Population
  - Total: 378
- Postal code: 86-170
- SIMC: 0093065

Zdrojewo is a village in the administrative district of Gmina Nowe, within Świecie County, Kuyavian–Pomeranian Voivodeship, in northern Poland. The settlement lies within the ethnocultural region of Kociewie.
