= Grigory Oryol =

Soviet military commander

- Born: 16 September 1904
- Died: 3 February 1974 (aged 69); Moscow, Soviet Union
- Military career
- Allegiance: Soviet Union (1924–1969)
- Service years: 1924–1969
- Rank: Colonel-General
- Conflicts: World War II
- Awards: Order of Lenin; Order of the Red Banner (3); Order of Suvorov, 1st Class; Order of Kutuzov, 1st Class; Order of Suvorov, 2nd Class; Order of the Patriotic War, 1st Class

External image
- Grigory Oryol's official portrait.

Grigory Nikolaevich Oryol (Russian: Григорий Николаевич Орёл, 16 September 1904 – 3 February 1974) was a Soviet armored corps general.

== Biography ==
=== Early life ===
Oryol joined the Red Army in 1924. At the mid-1930s, he attended the Military Academy of Mechanization and Motorization (now part of the Combined Arms Academy), where he became close friends with General Sergei Shtemenko. After graduation, he was assigned to the 22nd Maxim Gorky Cavalry Division, commanding the mechanized regiment and later the armored regiment.

=== World War II ===
At the beginning of the Great Patriotic War he headed the Armoured Automobiles department in the General Staff, and later became the commander of the armored and mechanized divisions in the 16th Army, under General Rokossovsky. As such, he took part in the battle of Moscow. Oryol remained the commander of Rokossovsky's tanks, and headed the Mechanized and Armored Formations of the Bryansk Front, which later was re-formed as the Don Front. While stationed in the Don Front, he participated in the Battle of Stalingrad. On 17 November 1942, he was given the rank of a major general. After the Don Front was renamed Central Front, Oryol supervised its armored units during the Battle of Kursk. Oryol remained in his post as the Central Front became the 1st Belorussian Front. At 5 November 1943, he was promoted to lieutenant general. When Marshal Georgy Zhukov replaced Rokossovsky, Oryol headed the tank formations under his command during Vistula-Oder Offensive and the Battle of Berlin.

=== Post-war years ===
After the war, Oryol was appointed inspector-general the armored and mechanized forces stationed in all the USSR's Military Districts. At 1961, he became an inspector in the Ministry of Defense and was given his final promotion to Colonel-General on 1962. He retired from the Armed Forces during 1969.

== Honours and awards ==
- Order of Lenin
- Order of the Red Banner, three times
- Order of Suvorov, 1st class and 2nd class
- Order of Kutuzov, 1st class
- Order of the Patriotic War, 1st class
