= Job von Witzleben =

Prussian lieutenant general

Karl Ernst Job Wilhelm von Witzleben
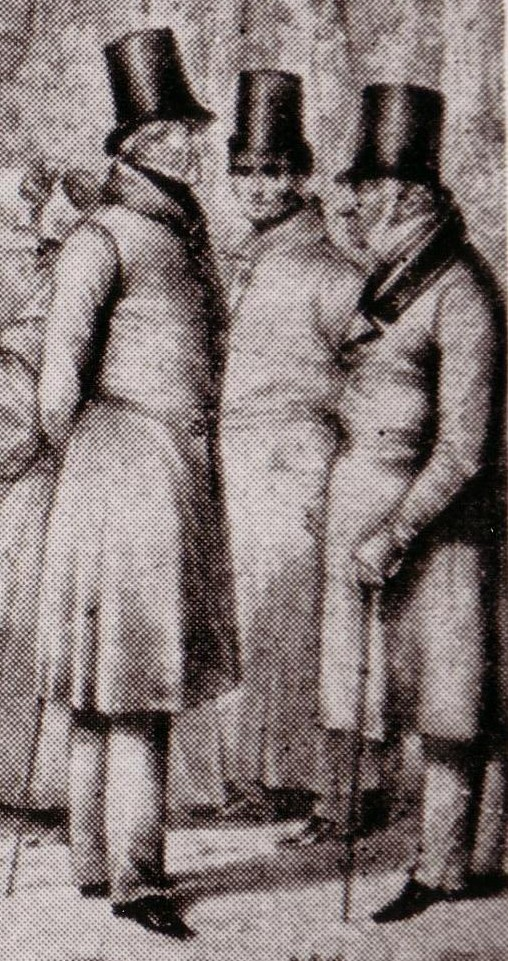
- Witzleben flanked by General Leopold Wilhelm von Dobschütz (left) and the French envoy Nicolas Joseph Maison (right) during a meeting in Teplitz, from a lithograph by Theodor Hosemann (1832)
- Born: 20 July 1783; Halberstadt, Principality of Halberstadt, Kingdom of Prussia
- Died: 9 July 1837 (aged 53); Berlin
- Burial place: Invalids' Cemetery, Berlin
- Military career
- Allegiance: Kingdom of Prussia
- Branch: Prussian Army
- Service years: 1793–1835
- Rank: Lieutenant-General
- Conflicts: Napoleonic Wars
- Awards: Iron Cross; Order of the Red Eagle

Karl Ernst Job Wilhelm von Witzleben (20 July 1783 – 9 July 1837) was a Prussian lieutenant general, adjutant-general to the king, and minister of war.

== Career ==
Born in Halberstadt, Witzleben was the first-born son of Lieutenant Heinrich Günther von Witzleben (1755–1825) and his wife Amalie Karoline Luise Wilhelmine, née von Wulffen (1766–1807). Of Thuringian Uradel, he became a personal squire to the Hohenzollern king Frederick William II of Prussia in 1793, and then an ensign in the Royal Guard in 1799. His active career was promoted by King Frederick William III who became a close friend.

Witzleben achieved the rank of Second Lieutenant in 1802. He was captured in the Battle of Jena–Auerstedt fought on 14 October 1806, but was exchanged in August 1807. His work Ideas on the Reorganisation of the Light Infantry, caught the attention of Gerhard von Scharnhorst, so that he was transferred in December 1808 to the newly formed Garde-Jäger-Bataillon as a Stabskapitän. In early 1812 he was promoted to major and fought on 2 May 1813 in the Battle of Lützen. During the war in France he was promoted to lieutenant colonel. In spring 1815 he joined the general staff of the army of Field Marshal Gebhard Leberecht von Blücher and was then made a colonel.

Having been made a lieutenant general in 1821, he was appointed the successor of the Prussian Minister of War Karl Georg Albrecht Ernst von Hake upon his resignation in 1833. He worked to integrate the standing army and the Landwehr. He also managed the introduction of the needle gun, and revised the military criminal code. Job von Witzleben retired due to severe illness in 1835 and died two years later, aged 53. He was buried in the Berlin Invalids' Cemetery, close to Scharnhorsts's grave.

== Personal life ==
Witzleben married Auguste Henriette, née von Splittgerber in 1812. The couple had eight children. His daughter Hertha (1815–1879) was married to Edwin Freiherr von Manteuffel. In 1823, he acquired a large estate close to Charlottenburg, where he had a manor house erected. Later named Witzleben quarter, the area is today part of Berlin's Charlottenburg-Wilmersdorf borough. He also held Liszkowo manor in West Prussia.

General Lieutenant Witzleben was musically talented and a gifted violinist. As a freemason, he was a member of the Grand National Mother Lodge, "The Three Globes".

== Decorations ==
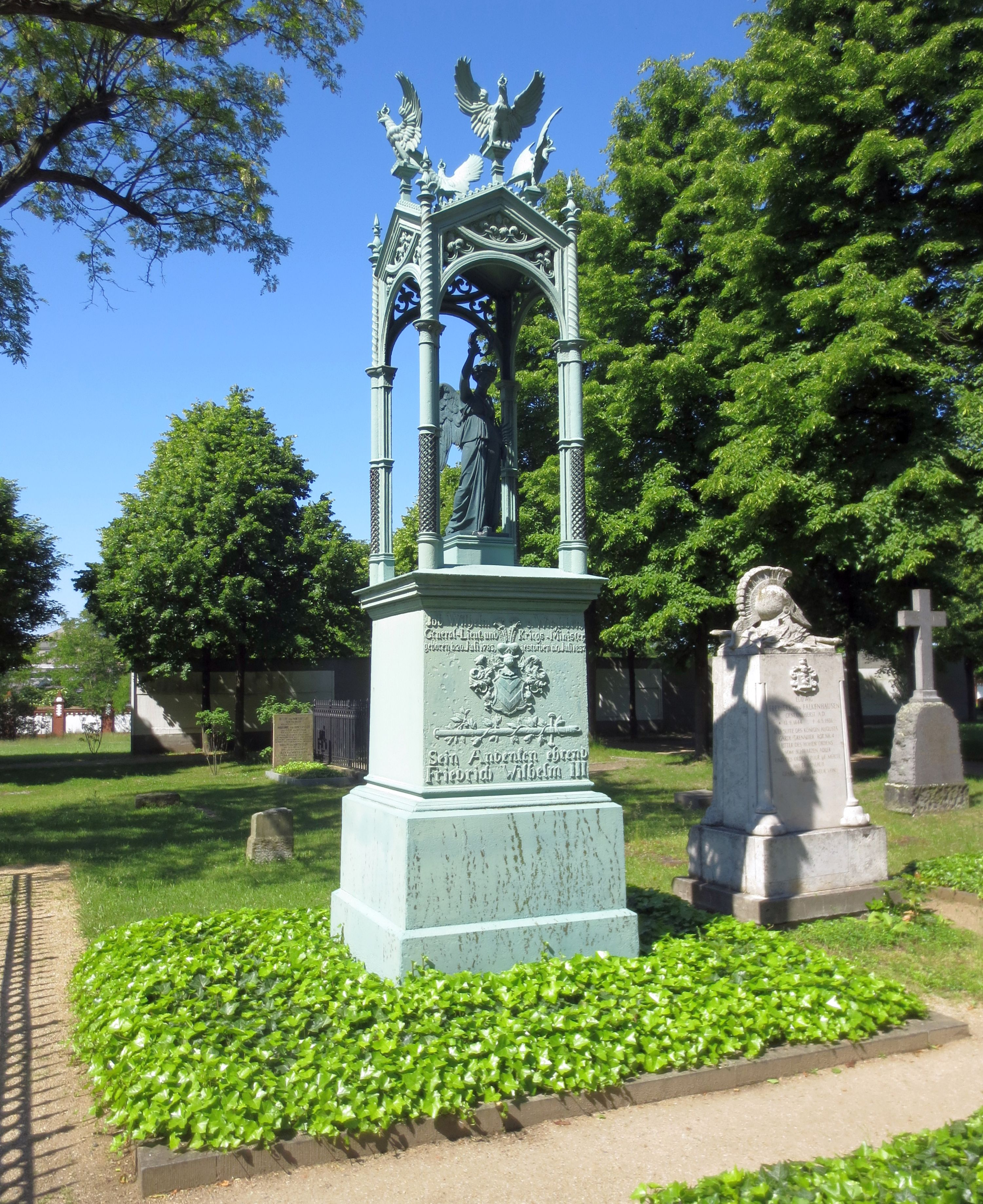
Grave monument

- Iron Cross, second (1813) and first class (1814)
- Order of the Red Eagle, third class (1817)
- Order of Stanislaus, first class (1818)
- Order of the Red Eagle, second class with oak leaf cluster (1820)
- Order of the Zähringer Lion (1822)
- Service Award Cross (1825)
- Commander of the Military William Order of the Netherlands (1825)
- Brilliant to the Order of Stanislaus, first class (1829)
- Star to the Order of the Red Eagle, second class (1830)
- Order of the Red Eagle, first class with oak leaf cluster (1832)
- Order of St. Alexander Nevsky (1834)
- Diamond to the Russian Order of Alexander Nevsky (1835)
- Ludwigsorden, Grand Cross (1835)
