= Kamień Krajeński =

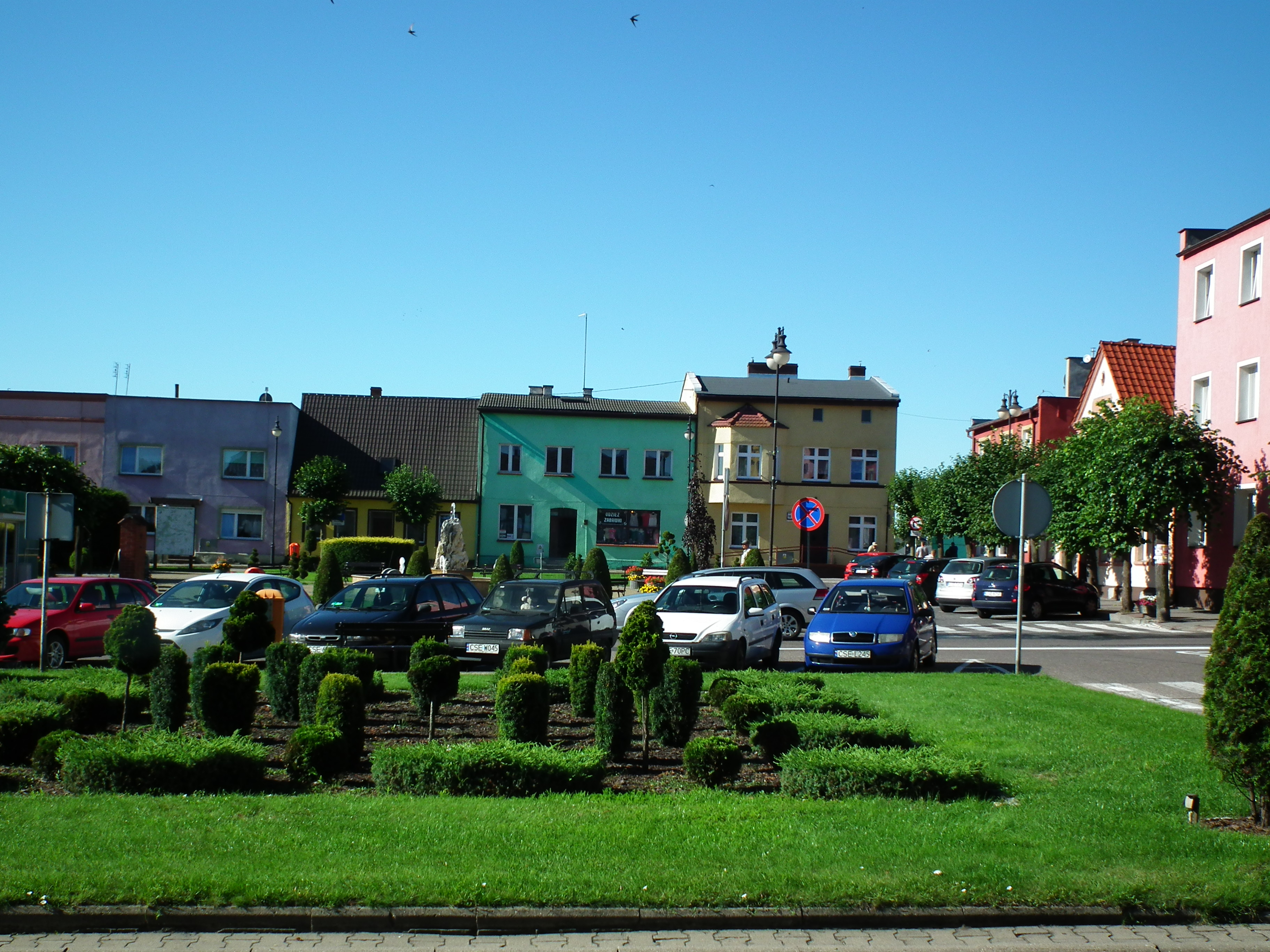
- Rynek (Market Square)

- Flag Coat of arms

- Location within Poland
- Coordinates: 53°31′55″N 17°31′43″E
- Country: Poland
- Voivodeship: Kuyavian-Pomeranian
- County: Sępólno
- Gmina: Kamień Krajeński
- First mentioned: 1107
- Town rights: 1359

Government
  - Mayor: Natalia Marciniak

Area
  - Total: 3.65 km^{2} (1.41 sq mi)

Population (2010)
  - Total: 2,344
  - Density: 642/km^{2} (1,660/sq mi)
- Time zone: UTC+1 (CET)
  - Summer (DST): UTC+2 (CEST)
- Postal code: 89-430
- Vehicle registration: CSE
- Website: http://www.kamienkrajenski.pl

Kamień Krajeński (Polish: [ˈkamjɛj̃ kraˈjɛj̃skʲi]; German: Kamin in Westpreußen) is a town in Sępólno County, Kuyavian-Pomeranian Voivodeship in northern Poland, with 2,344 inhabitants (2010). It is located within the ethnocultural region of Krajna.

== History ==
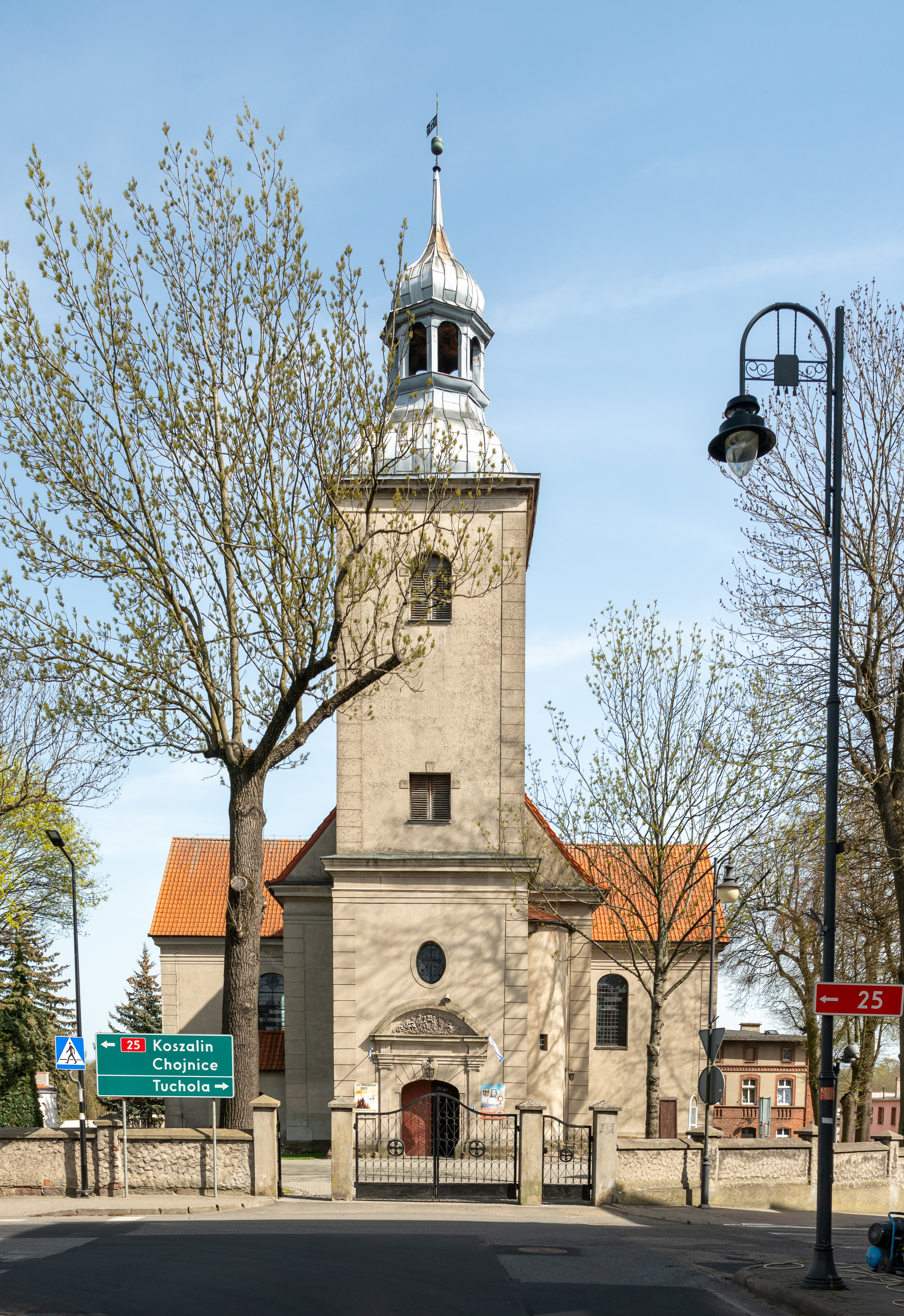
Baroque Saints Peter and Paul church

The first historical record of Kamień comes from 1107. Its name means "stone" in Polish. It was a seat of a castellany during the reign of Bolesław III Wrymouth of Poland. In the thirteenth century it belonged to the Archbishop of Gniezno. It was briefly occupied by the Teutonic Knights in 1339 before reverting to Poland. In 1359 it received municipal rights from Archbishop Jarosław. Shortly after a defensive castle was built which survived until 1721. Administratively it was located in the Nakło County in the Kalisz Voivodeship in the Greater Poland Province.

After the First Partition of Poland in 1772, Kamień was annexed by the Kingdom of Prussia, and under the Germanized name Kamin, it formed part of the Flatow district (Landkreis Flatow) in the Prussian Province of West Prussia. Since 1871, it belonged to Germany. According to the census of 1910, Kamin had a population of 1,547, of which 1,312 (84.8%) were Germans.

In 1920, the eastern part of the district including the towns of Kamień, Więcbork and Sępólno Krajeńskie, which had 30,516 inhabitants (including 8,600 Poles) was reintegrated with the newly established Second Polish Republic after the Treaty of Versailles. The town became part of Sępólno County.

After the German Invasion of Poland Sępólno County was annexed by Nazi Germany in 1939, and it became part of Landkreis Zempelburg. During the German occupation, Poles were subject to persecutions, mass arrests, expulsions and massacres. Numerous Poles were imprisoned in a concentration camp in Radzim and in a prison established by the Selbstschutz in Sępólno Krajeńskie, and later murdered there or deported to other Nazi concentration camps. Mass arrests of Poles were carried out from September 1939. In 1945, the town was restored to Poland.

=== Number of inhabitants by year ===
Historical population

Year	Pop.	±%
1805	743	—
1853	1,045	+40.6%
1871	1,679	+60.7%
1880	1,737	+3.5%
1890	1,596	−8.1%
1900	1,519	−4.8%
1910	1,547	+1.8%

Year	Pop.	±%
1921	1,501	−3.0%
1931	1,827	+21.7%
1939	1,523	−16.6%
1950	1,292	−15.2%
1960	1,517	+17.4%
2010	2,344	+54.5%
