= Gmina Kamień Krajeński =

Gmina Kamień Krajeński Kamień Krajeński Commune
- Gmina
- Coat of arms
- Interactive map of Gmina Kamień Krajeński
- Coordinates (Kamień Krajeński): 53°31′55″N 17°31′43″E
- Country: Poland
- Voivodeship: Kuyavian-Pomeranian
- County: Sępólno
- Seat: Kamień Krajeński

Area
  - Total: 163.21 km^{2} (63.02 sq mi)

Population (2006)
  - Total: 6,850
  - Density: 42.0/km^{2} (109/sq mi)
  - Urban: 2,251
  - Rural: 4,599
- Website: http://www.kamienkrajenski.pl/

Gmina Kamień Krajeński is an urban-rural gmina (administrative district) in Sępólno County, Kuyavian-Pomeranian Voivodeship, in north-central Poland. Its seat in the historic Krajna region is the town of Kamień Krajeński, which lies approximately 10 kilometres (6 mi) north of Sępólno Krajeńskie and 56 km (35 mi) north-west of Bydgoszcz.

The gmina covers an area of 163.21 square kilometres (63.0 sq mi), and as of 2006 its total population is 6,850 (out of which the population of Kamień Krajeński amounts to 2,251, and the population of the rural part of the gmina is 4,599).

The gmina contains part of the protected area called Krajna Landscape Park.

== Villages ==
Apart from the town of Kamień Krajeński, Gmina Kamień Krajeński contains the villages and settlements of Dąbrowa, Dąbrówka, Duża Cerkwica, Jakubowo, Jerzmionki, Mała Cerkwica, Niwy, Nowa Wieś, Obkas, Obkas-Młyn, Orzełek, Osady Zamerckie, Płocicz, Radzim, Witkowo and Zamarte.

== Neighbouring gminas ==
Gmina Kamień Krajeński is bordered by the gminas of Chojnice, Człuchów, Debrzno, Kęsowo and Sępólno Krajeńskie.
