= Krajna =

Region in Poland

Coordinates: 53°10′N 17°35′E

- Historical region
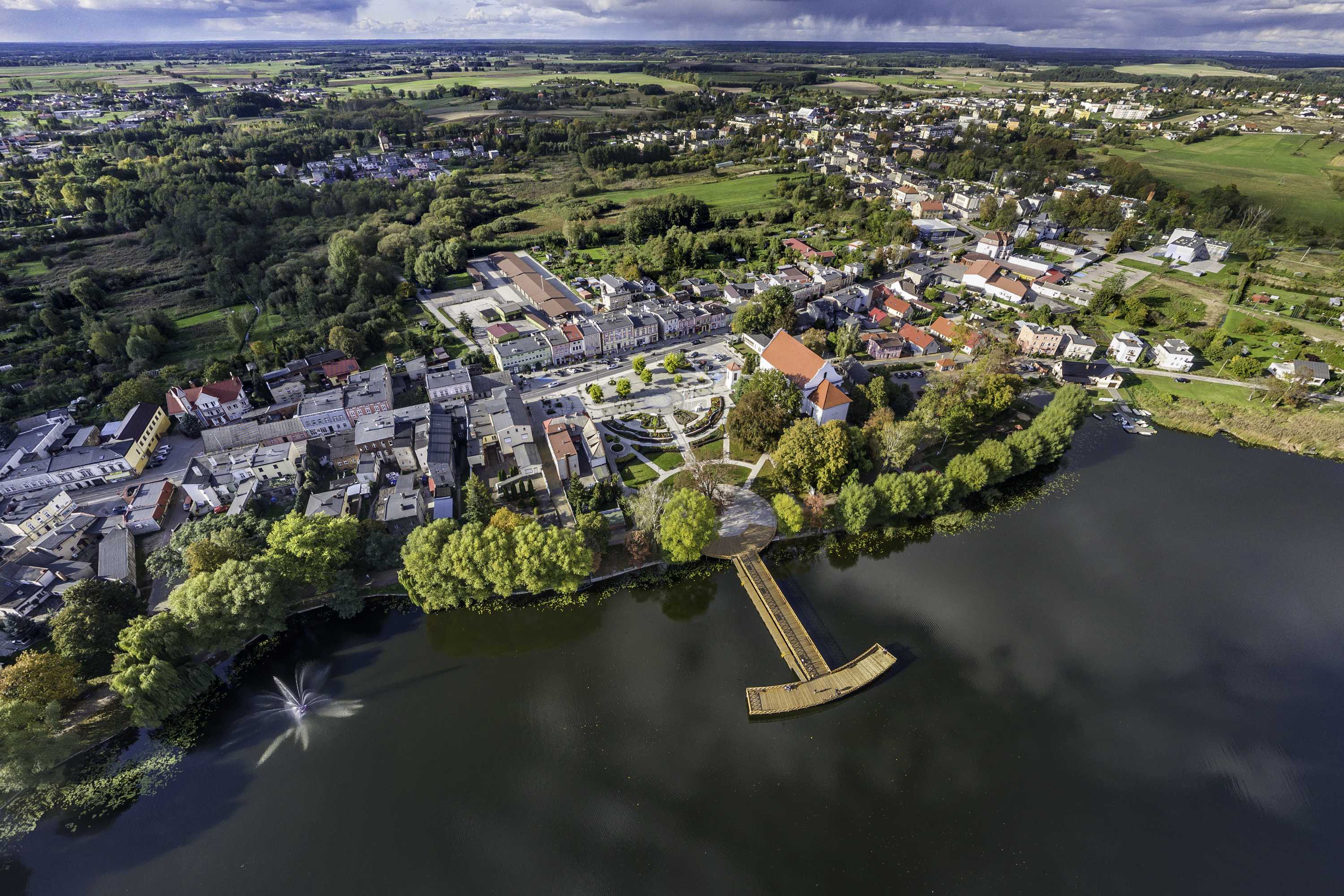
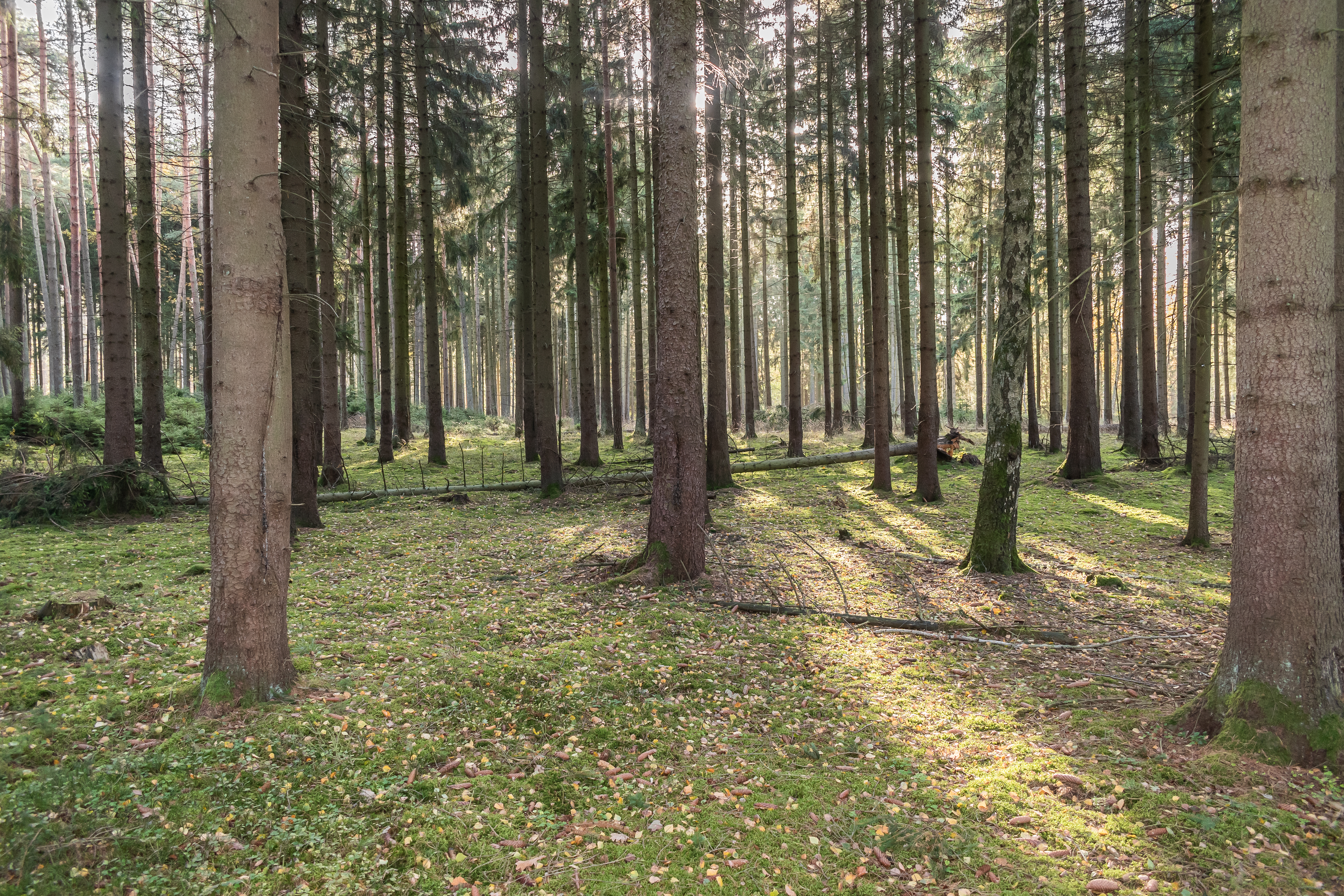
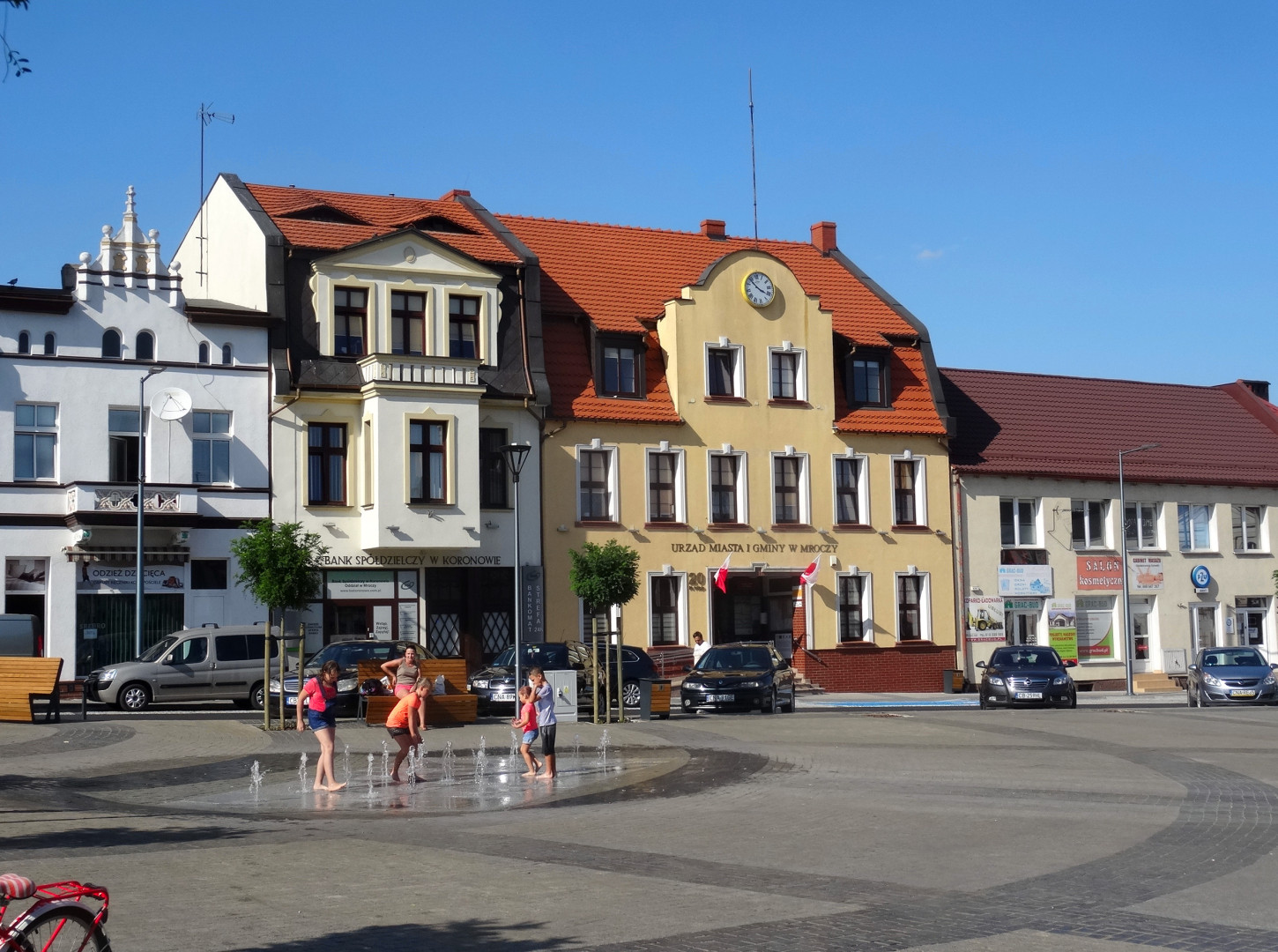
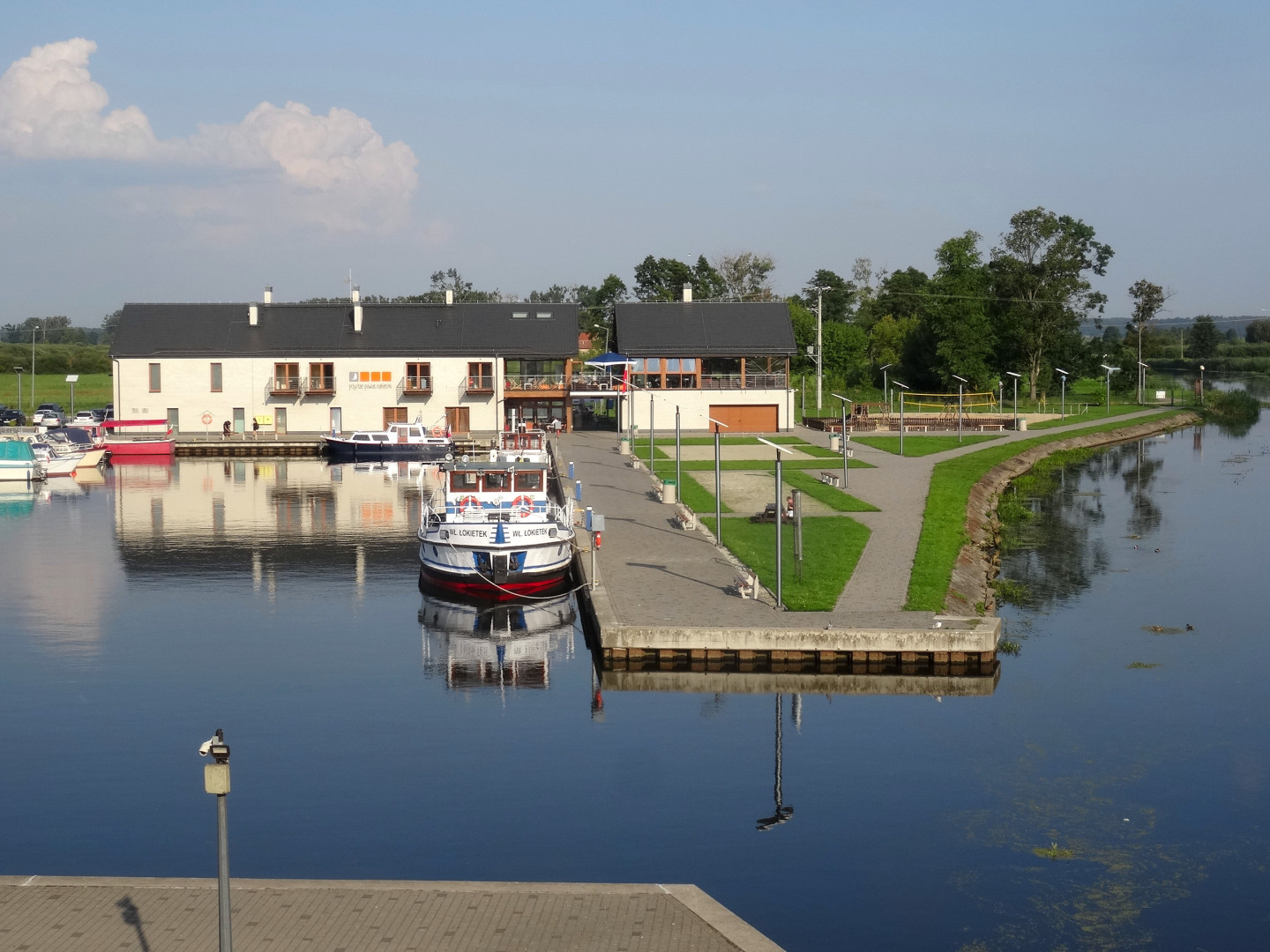
- From top, left to right: Więcbork; Krajna Landscape Park; Market Square in Mrocza; Haven in Nakło nad Notecią

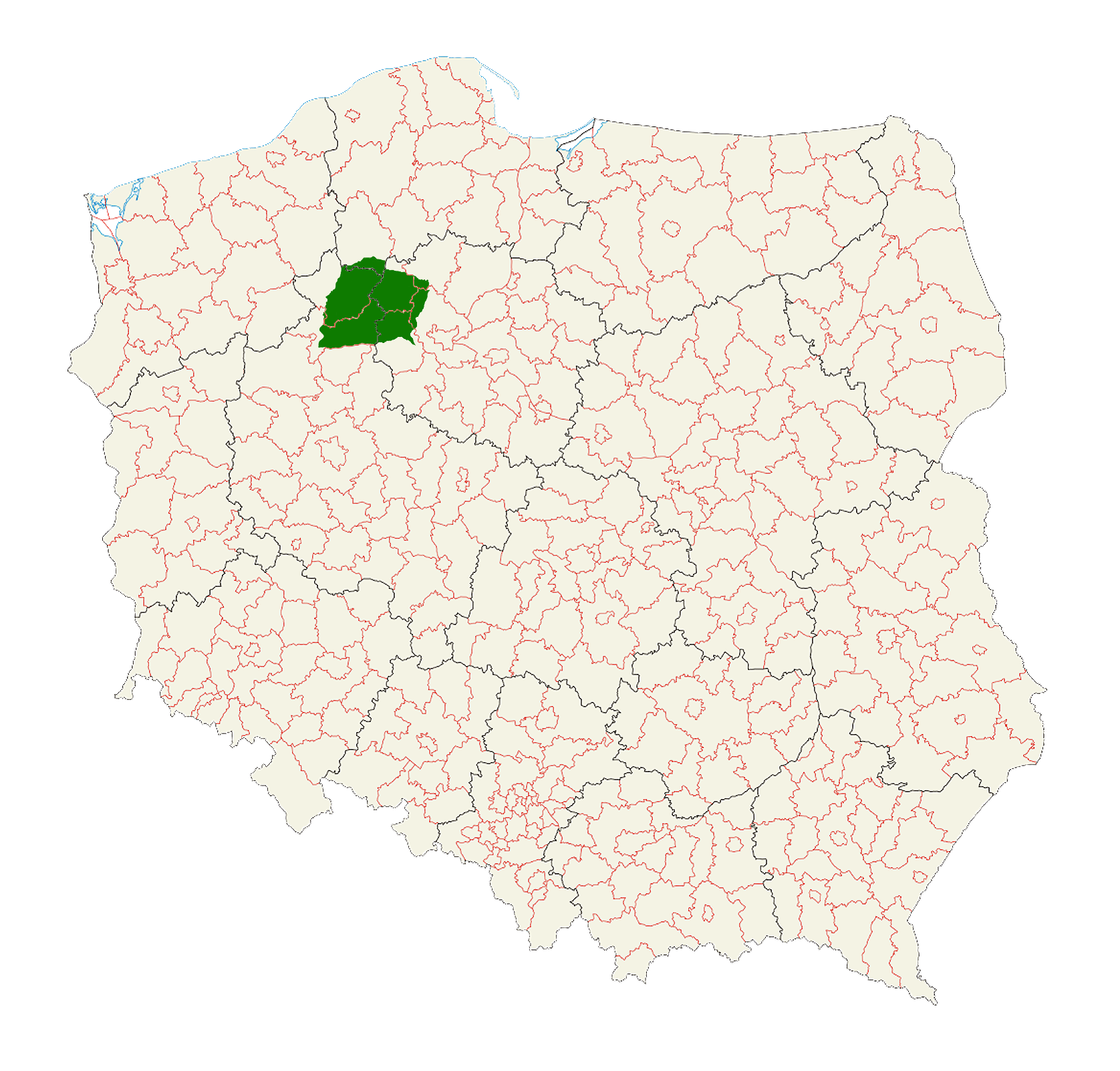
- Krajna on the map of Poland
- Country: Poland
- Historical region: Greater Poland
- Capital: Nakło nad Notecią
- Largest city: Piła
- Time zone: UTC+1 (CET)
  - Summer (DST): UTC+2 (CEST)

Krajna is a forested historical region in the north of Greater Poland in Poland, situated in the border area between the Greater Poland, Kuyavian-Pomeranian and Pomeranian Voivodeships. The region consists of parts of Złotów, Piła, Sępólno, Nakło, Bydgoszcz and Człuchów counties, namely the urban gmina of Złotów, the rural gmina of Złotów and the urban-rural gminas of Krajenka, Wysoka, Wyrzysk, Łobżenica, Kamień Krajeński, Sępólno Krajeńskie, Więcbork, Nakło nad Notecią, Koronowo and Debzno. The name of Krajna is derived from the Slavic word for borderland (between Greater Poland and Pomerania), cf. Krajina.

The main towns in the region are Złotów and Nakło nad Notecią. Since 1932, Krajna has own regional anthem, composed by Paweł "Krajnomir" Jasiek

Part of the region forms a protected area called Krajna Landscape Park.

== History ==
Krajna formed part of the Greater Poland Province (1569-1795) of the Crown of the Kingdom of Poland (c.1370–1795). In 1655, it was invaded by Sweden, and the Battle of Ujście was fought there.

During the German occupation of Poland (World War II), the population was subjected to various crimes, including deportations to forced labour and concentration camps, expulsions and executions. Concentration camps for Poles from the region were operated in Radzim and Karolewo, and many were either deported to other concentration camps or massacres at nearby Rudzki Most. Other major sites of massacres of local Poles committed by the SS and Selbstschutz included Paterek, Łobżenica, Górka Klasztorna and Sadki. The Polish resistance movement was active in the region.

The Third Reich operated numerous forced labour camps in the region, including several subcamps of the Stalag II-B and Stalag XX-A prisoner-of-war camps for Allied POWs. One of the prisoners was future British actor Sam Kydd, who, as he wrote in his memoir, learnt various Polish phrases through contact with the local Polish population.

== Towns ==
- Kaczory
- Kamień Krajeński
- Krajenka
- Łobżenica
- Miasteczko Krajeńskie
- Mrocza
- Nakło nad Notecią
- Piła
- Sępólno Krajeńskie
- Ujście
- Więcbork
- Wyrzysk
- Wysoka
- Złotów
