= Krajna Landscape Park =

Protected area in Poland

Coordinates: 53.4467°N 17.4825°E

- Krajeński Park Krajobrazowy
- IUCN category V (protected landscape/seascape)
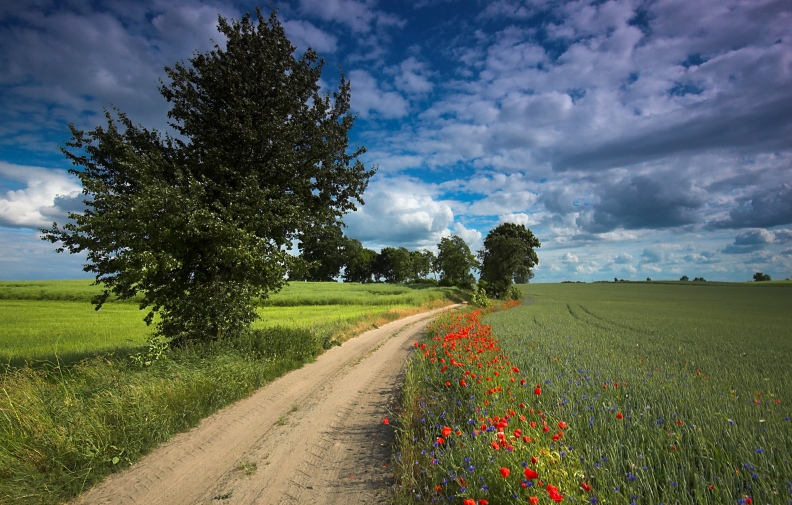
- Landscape in the park
- Interactive map of Krajna Landscape Park
- Location: Kuyavian-Pomeranian Voivodeship
- Area: 543.95 km^{2} (210.02 sq mi)
- Established: 1998

Krajna Landscape Park (Krajeński Park Krajobrazowy) is a protected area (Landscape Park) in the Krajna region of north-central Poland. The Park was established in 1998, and covers an area of 543.95 square kilometres (210.02 sq mi).

The Park lies within Kuyavian-Pomeranian Voivodeship: in Nakło County (Gmina Mrocza) and Sępólno County (Gmina Sępólno Krajeńskie, Gmina Kamień Krajeński, Gmina Sośno, Gmina Więcbork).

Within the Landscape Park are five nature reserves.
