= Jerzmionki =

- Village
- Location within Poland
- Coordinates: 53°36′N 17°31′E
- Country: Poland
- Voivodeship: Kuyavian-Pomeranian
- County: Sępólno
- Gmina: Kamień Krajeński
- Population: 100

Jerzmionki [jɛʐˈmjɔnki] is a village in the administrative district of Gmina Kamień Krajeński, within Sępólno County, Kuyavian-Pomeranian Voivodeship, in north-central Poland.
