= Anthem of Krajna =

The "Anthem of Krajna" is a song whose lyrics were written by Paweł Jasiek. It is used by the inhabitants of Krajna, Poland as an unofficial anthem.

The song was composed in the 1930s. The lyrics were written by Paweł Jasiek on August 25, 1932, in Olsztyn, having just returned from a visit to his hometown of Zakrzewo. Music was written roughly at the same time as the lyrics. In 1975 a citizen of Łódź, Professor Bernard Pietrzak, worked out an arrangement for a four-person mixed choir. The anthem of Krajna is also used by the Ziemia Krajeńska Elementary School in Samsieczno as the school anthem.

== Lyrics of the anthem ==
W drogiej nad życie rodzinnej ziemi mej,
O rannym świcie pieśń płynie z leśnych kniej.
Dębowy bór z bukami wtór, szumi hymn cichej chwały,
A rzewny śpiew, miłości zew, spływa na kraj nasz cały.

In my homeland, so dear to me,
At the crack of dawn a song flows from the depths of the woods.
An oak wood together with beech, a quiet glory hymn rustles,
And the touching sing, a call of love, flows towards all our land.

Krajno kochana, co od zarania dni,
Rozmiłowana dzieci swe żywisz ty.
Za pokarm twój, za soków zdrój, wyssany z głębi łona,
Za tchnienia czar, za rosy dar, bądź nam błogosławiona.

My dear land, which since the dawn of days,
Has been feeding your children, so full of love.
For the food you bring, for the juicy spring from the depths of your womb,
for the breathing magic, for the gift of dew, be blessed.

Ziemio ty miła, tak pełna złudnych słów,
Piastową byłaś, piastową będziesz znów.
Ni wichrów moc, w burzliwą noc, ni grom, ni błyskawice
Nie złamią nas i po wszy czas stać będziem, my dziedzice.

O, lovely land, so full of deceptive words,
You belonged to the Piasts, and so you will again.
Neither the mighty gales of a stormy night, nor thunder, nor lightning
Shall break us and so we shall stand forever, us, heirs.
