= Obkas-Młyn =

- Village
- Location within Poland
- Coordinates: 53°33′22″N 17°30′55″E
- Country: Poland
- Voivodeship: Kuyavian-Pomeranian
- County: Sępólno
- Gmina: Kamień Krajeński

Obkas-Młyn [ˈɔpkas ˈmwɨn] is a village in the administrative district of Gmina Kamień Krajeński, within Sępólno County, Kuyavian-Pomeranian Voivodeship, in north-central Poland.
