= Dąbrówka, Sępólno County =

Dąbrówka
- Village
- Location within Poland
- Coordinates: 53°34′38″N 17°37′12″E
- Country: Poland
- Voivodeship: Kuyavian-Pomeranian
- County: Sępólno
- Gmina: Kamień Krajeński
- Population: 790

Dąbrówka [dɔmˈbrufka] is a village in the administrative district of Gmina Kamień Krajeński, within Sępólno County, Kuyavian-Pomeranian Voivodeship, in north-central Poland.
