= Moritz Brasch =

German philosopher and man of letters (1843–1895)

Moritz Brasch (18 August 1843 in Zempelburg, Prussia, now Sępólno Krajeńskie – 14 September 1895 in Leipzig) was a German philosopher and man of letters.

He was educated at the universities of Berlin, Greifswald, and Jena, settling at Berlin on the completion of his studies. Finally he went to Leipzig, where he became (1874–79) the chief editor of the Brockhaus Konversations-Lexikon.

== Publications ==
Brasch ranked high among German essayists. He published the following works:

- "Benedictus von Spinoza's System der Philosophie," 1870
- "Lichtstrahlen aus Mendelssohn's Schriften nach der Ethica Dargestellt," 1875
- "Die Klassiker der Philosophie," 3 vols. 1883–86
- "Gesammelte Essays und Charakterköpfe zur Neuern Philosophie und Litteratur," 2 vols. 1885–86
- "Philosophie der Gegenwart" (vol. iv. of "Klassiker der Philosophie"), 1887
- "Welt-und Lebensanschauung Friedrich Uberwegs," 1888
- "Philosophie und Politik: Studien über Lassalle und Johann Jacoby," 1890
- "Gesch. der Leipziger Universität von ihrem Ursprung bis zur Gegenwart," 1890
- "Lehrbuch der Gesch. der Philosophie," 2d ed. 1893
- "Wesen und Ziele der Ethischen Bewegung," 1894
- "Leipziger Philosophen im 19. Jahrhundert—Porträts und Studien," 1894
- "Die Facultätenfrage und die Stellung der Philosophie," 1895.

He edited:

- Moses Mendelssohn's "Werke zur Metaphysik, Religionsphilosophie und Aesthetik," 2 vols. 1880, 2d ed. 1881
- Friedrich Ueberweg's "Schiller als Philosoph und Historiker," 1885; Schopenhauer's works, 2 vols., 1891
- Schriften zur Philosophie, Aesthetik und Apologetik, 1892
- Aristotle's "Politeia" (German transl. with introduction and notes), 1894.
