= Osady Zamerckie =

- Village
- Location within Poland
- Coordinates: 53°35′38″N 17°30′26″E
- Country: Poland
- Voivodeship: Kuyavian-Pomeranian
- County: Sępólno
- Gmina: Kamień Krajeński

Osady Zamerckie [ɔˈsadɨ zaˈmɛrt͡skʲɛ] is a village in the administrative district of Gmina Kamień Krajeński, within Sępólno County, Kuyavian-Pomeranian Voivodeship, in north-central Poland.
