= Aaron ben Eliezer Lipman =

Polish rabbi from 1600s

Aaron ben Eliezer Lipman was a mid-seventeenth century rabbi of the town of Sępólno Krajeńskie in Poland (known as Zempelburg in German, and later part of West Prussia between 1772 and 1920).

He was an intimate friend of Shabbethai Hurwitz, rabbi of Prague. His work, Ḳorban Aharon (The Offering of Aaron), was first published at Amsterdam, in 1646, and has gone through several editions. It summarizes in alphabetical order the decisions which R. Moses Isserles (RMA) has laid down in his ritualistic work, Torat Ḥaṭat. Aaron is also known as the author of an acrostic meditation (teḥinnah), beginning "Elohai dalfah 'eni" (My eye droppeth tears, O my God!).
