= Jakubowo, Sępólno County =

Jakubowo
- Village
- Location within Poland
- Coordinates: 53°30′21″N 17°30′21″E
- Country: Poland
- Voivodeship: Kuyavian-Pomeranian
- County: Sępólno
- Gmina: Kamień Krajeński

Jakubowo [jakuˈbɔvɔ] is a village in the administrative district of Gmina Kamień Krajeński, within Sępólno County, Kuyavian-Pomeranian Voivodeship, in north-central Poland.
