= Witkowo, Sępólno County =

Witkowo
- Village
- Location within Poland
- Coordinates: 53°32′N 17°26′E
- Country: Poland
- Voivodeship: Kuyavian-Pomeranian
- County: Sępólno
- Gmina: Kamień Krajeński
- Population: 210

Witkowo [vitˈkɔvɔ] is a village in the administrative district of Gmina Kamień Krajeński, within Sępólno County, Kuyavian-Pomeranian Voivodeship, in north-central Poland.
