= Friedrich Ueberweg =

German historian of philosophy (1826–1871)

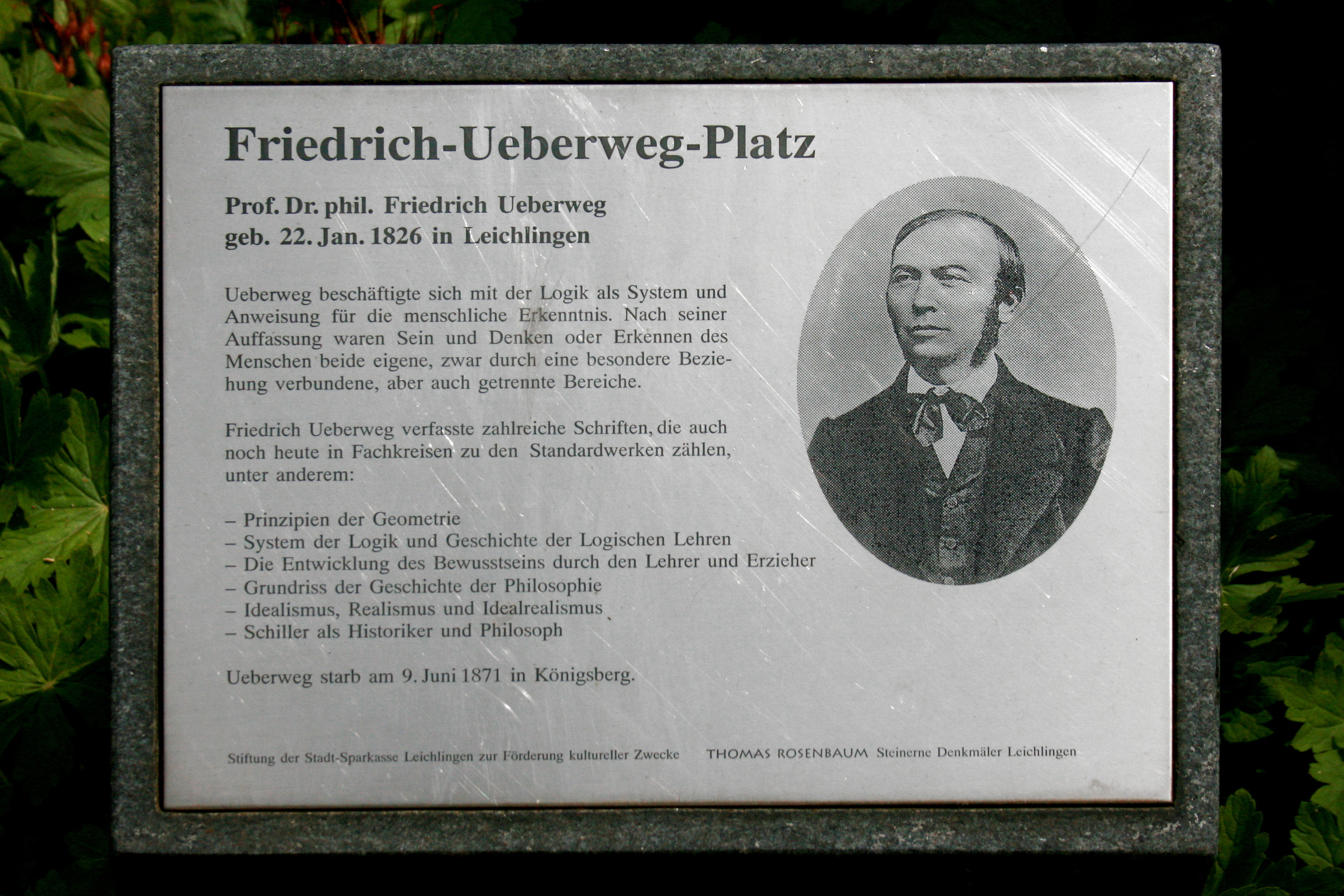
Friedrich Ueberweg (Plaque on Friedrich-Ueberweg-Platz at the corner of Marktstraße and Mittelstraße in Leichlingen)

Friedrich Ueberweg (German: [ˈyːbɐˌveːk]; 22 January 1826 – 9 June 1871) was a German philosopher and historian of philosophy.

== Biography ==
Friedrich Ueberweg was born in Leichlingen, Rhine Province. His parents were Johann Gottlob Friedrich Ueberweg (19 August 1797 - 9 February 1826), who was pastor of a Lutheran church in Leichlingen, and Helene Boeddinghaus (24 October 1798 - 8 August 1868). Helene was a daughter of Karl Theodor Boeddinghaus (21 February 1765 - 27 December 1842), who was a Lutheran pastor in the neighboring town of Ronsdorf.

Educated at the University of Göttingen and the Humboldt University of Berlin, Friedrich qualified at the University of Bonn as Privatdozent in philosophy (1852). In 1862 he was called to the University of Königsberg as extraordinary professor, and in 1867 he was promoted to the grade of professor ordinarius. He married Anna Henriette Luise Panzenhagen (24 August 1844 - 16 March 1909) on 1 September 1863, in Pillau, Province of Prussia. Ueberweg died in Königsberg in 1871.

== Philosophy ==
At first Ueberweg followed the empiricism of Friedrich Eduard Beneke and strongly opposed the subjectivistic tendency of the Kantian system, maintaining in particular the objectivity of space and time, which involved him in a somewhat violent controversy. His own mode of thought he preferred later to describe as an ideal realism, which refused to reduce reality to thought, but asserted a parallelism between the forms of existence and the forms of knowledge. Beneke and Friedrich Schleiermacher exercised most influence upon the development of his thought.

== Selected works ==
Ueberweg's compendious Grundriss der Geschichte der Philosophie ("Sketch of the History of Philosophy"; 3 volumes, 1863–1866) is regarded by many academics and scholars as remarkable for its fullness of information, conciseness, accuracy and impartiality.

Other works include:

- De elementis animae mundi Platonicae (On the elements of the Platonic world of ideas), Dissertation, 1850
- Die Entwicklung des Bewußtseins durch den Lehrer und Erzieher (The development of consciousness by the teacher and educator), 1853
- System der Logik und Geschichte der logischen Lehren (System of Logic and History of Logical Doctrines), 1857
- Über Idealismus, Realismus und Idealrealismus (On idealism, realism and ideal-realism), 1859
- Über die Echtheit und Zeitfolge der platonischen Schriften (On the authenticity and chronology of the Platonic writings), 1861
- Schiller als Historiker und Philosoph (Schiller as historian and philosopher), 1884
- Die Welt- und Lebensanschauung Friedrich Ueberwegs in seinem gesammelten philosophisch-kritischen Abhandlungen (Collected philosophical papers), Leipzig: Gustav Engel, 1889

== Sources ==
- Endnotes:
  - Friedrich Albert Lange (1828-1875) - Friedrich Ueberweg (Berlin, 1871)
  - Moritz Brasch (1843-1895) - Die Welt und Lebensanschauung Friedrich Ueberwegs (Leipzig, 1889)
