= Płocicz, Kuyavian-Pomeranian Voivodeship =

Płocicz
- Village
- Location within Poland
- Coordinates: 53°29′56″N 17°30′11″E
- Country: Poland
- Voivodeship: Kuyavian-Pomeranian
- County: Sępólno
- Gmina: Kamień Krajeński
- Population: 810

Płocicz [ˈpwɔt͡ɕit͡ʂ] is a village in the administrative district of Gmina Kamień Krajeński, within Sępólno County, Kuyavian-Pomeranian Voivodeship, in north-central Poland.
