= Radzim, Kuyavian-Pomeranian Voivodeship =

Radzim
- Village
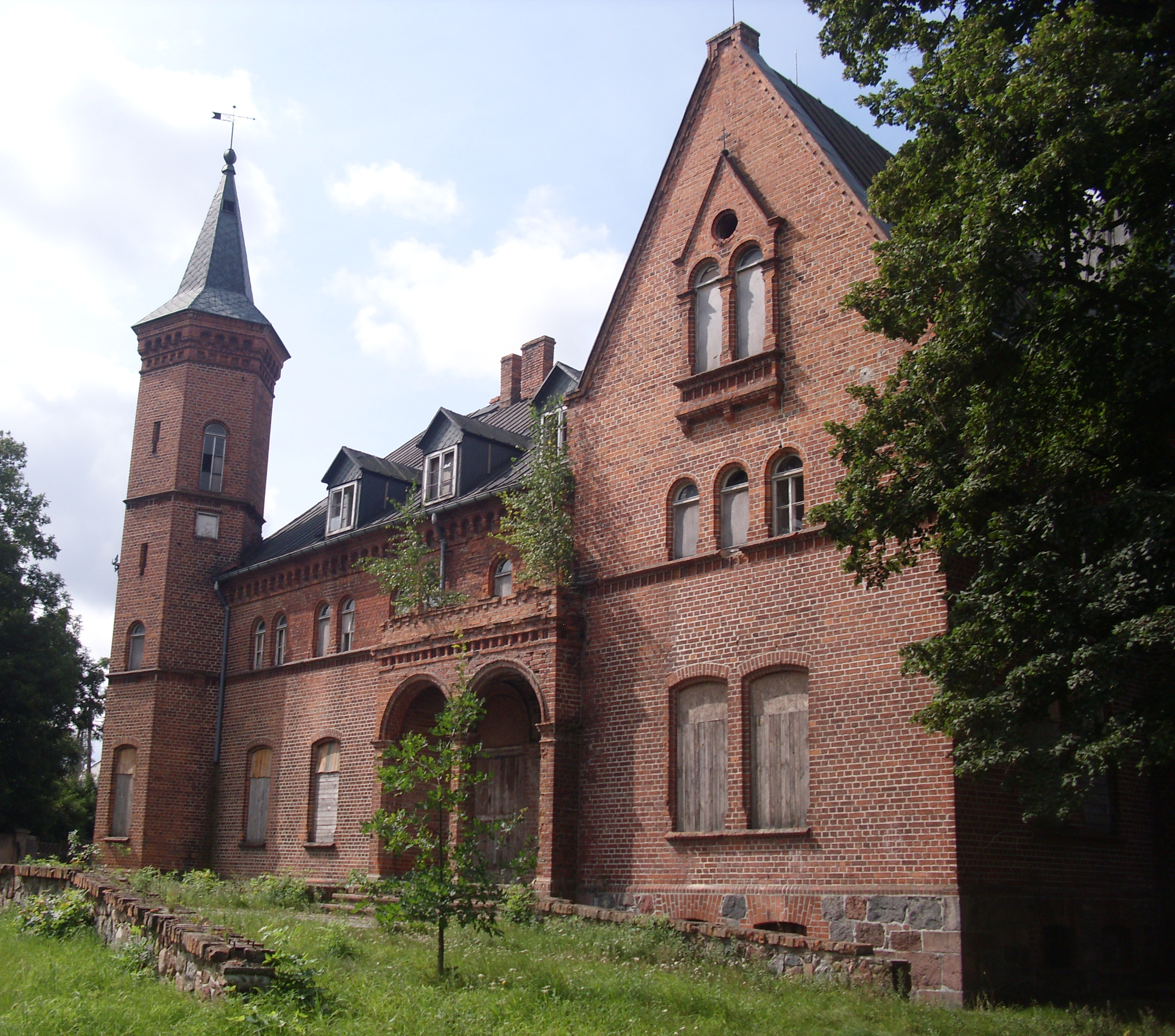
- Historic manor house in Radzim

- Location within Poland
- Coordinates: 53°31′59″N 17°36′03″E
- Country: Poland
- Voivodeship: Kuyavian-Pomeranian
- County: Sępólno
- Gmina: Kamień Krajeński

Population
  - Total: 310
- Time zone: UTC+1 (CET)
  - Summer (DST): UTC+2 (CEST)
- Vehicle registration: CSE

Radzim [ˈrad͡ʑim] is a village in the administrative district of Gmina Kamień Krajeński, within Sępólno County, Kuyavian-Pomeranian Voivodeship, in north-central Poland.

== History ==
During the occupation of Poland (World War II), the German Nazi administration operated a temporary concentration camp in the village (Internierungslager Resmin). Its prisoners were Poles and Jews from nearby towns of Sępólno Krajeńskie, Więcbork, Tuchola, Kamień Krajeński. Prisoners were mostly deported to other concentration camps or murdered in Radzim and Rudzki Most.
