= Sępólno Krajeńskie =

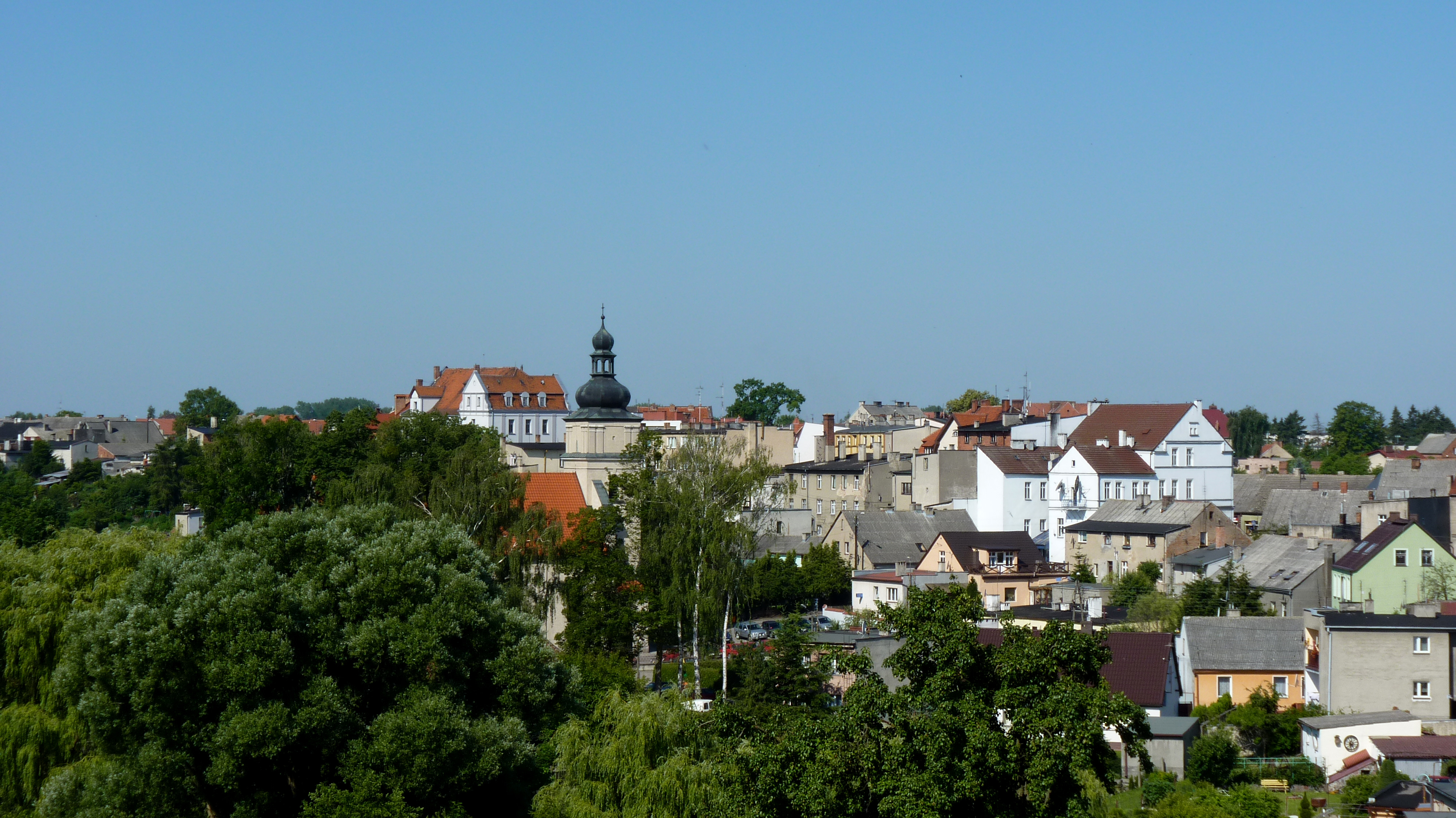

- Flag Coat of arms

- Location within Poland
- Coordinates: 53°27′0″N 17°31′48″E
- Country: Poland
- Voivodeship: Kuyavian-Pomeranian
- County: Sępólno
- Gmina: Sępólno Krajeńskie
- Town rights: 1360

Government
  - Mayor: Waldemar Stupałkowski

Area
  - Total: 5.82 km^{2} (2.25 sq mi)

Population (2006)
  - Total: 9,258
  - Density: 1,590/km^{2} (4,120/sq mi)
- Time zone: UTC+1 (CET)
  - Summer (DST): UTC+2 (CEST)
- Postal code: 89-400
- Car plates: CSE
- Website: http://www.gmina-sepolno.pl

Sępólno Krajeńskie (pronounced [sɛmˈpulnɔ kraˈjɛɲskʲɛ]; German: Zempelburg in Westpreußen) is a town in northern Poland, in the Kuyavian-Pomeranian Voivodeship. It is the capital of Sępólno County (Powiat Sępoleński) and Gmina Sępólno Krajeńskie.

In 2016, it had a total population of 15,907 with an urban population of 9,258 and rural population of 6,649.

== Location ==
The town is located in the historical Krajna forest on a high bank of the Sępólna River. It is located 63 km northwest of Bydgoszcz.

== History ==
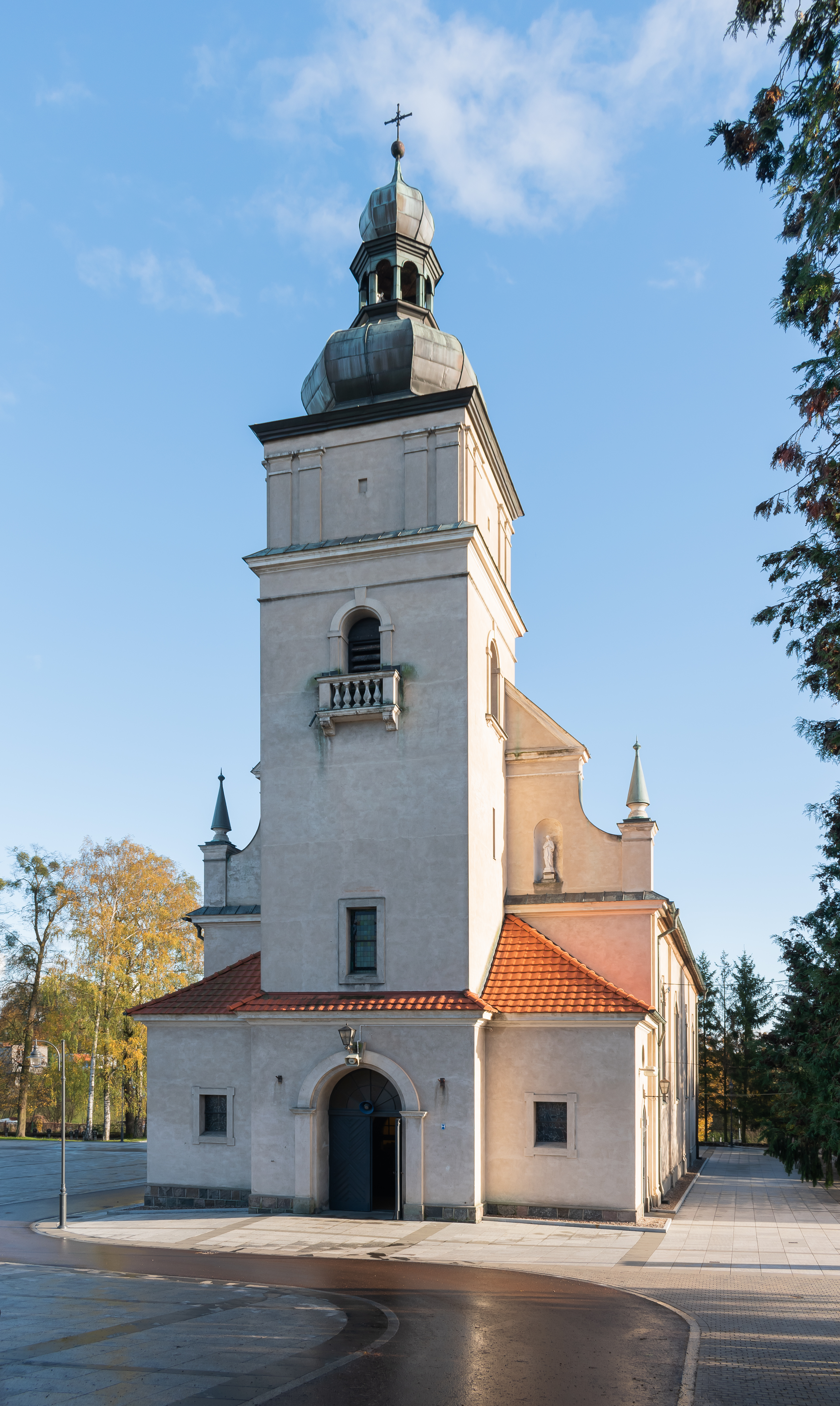
Neoclassical Saint Bartholomew church, which has a Renaissance-Baroque-Classicist interior

The town received Magdeburg rights in 1360 from King Casimir III the Great. The Catholic church, mentioned as early as 1360, suggests that it was located in the Sępólna River valley. According to legend, the castle manor was lost when the river and nearby Dziechowo Lake flooded. Sępólno was founded as a private town. It initially belonged to the Pakoski family. Later, it was owned by the Ostroróg, Goślubski, Zebrzydowski, Smoszewski, Brez and Potulicki families until 1821. Administratively it formed part of the Kalisz Voivodeship of the Greater Poland Province of the Kingdom of Poland. During the Thirteen Years' War between Poland and the Teutonic Knights the area was captured by the Knights and the town was looted.

Sępólno suffered during the Swedish invasions and epidemics of the 17th century. The Evangelical church on Schulenberg was destroyed in 1620. The location of a castle mentioned in 1679 is unknown. In 1764, the Niederstadt had 79 houses and the suburbs 71.

In the 18th century, the town had several weavers, shoemakers and farmers. The Jews of the town traded textiles and other fabricated goods to both Royal Prussia and Duchy of Prussia. A new synagogue was built in 1734. The Jewish community was still active until the early 20th century. In 1773 Sępólno had 70 craftsmen, including eight cloth makers and numerous shoemakers.

The town was annexed by the Kingdom of Prussia during the First Partition of Poland in 1772. Fires in 1781 and 1782 destroyed 73 houses so there existed now 84 devastated sites in the town. In the year 1783 the town had altogether 183 houses, most of them having thatched roofs. There was an influx of Jews, who, however, gradually emigrated westwards in the 19th century.

Sępólno was part of the short-lived Polish Duchy of Warsaw in 1807–1815 during the Napoleonic Wars, and afterwards it was re-annexed by Prussia. The Evangelical church was built in 1857-1858 and has since been demolished.

In the 19th century, Jews were obliged to give 30 Tympf, nine veal roasts, six beef roasts, six pounds of tallow, and one pound of gunpowder to the Catholic parish every year on Corpus Christi and Easter.

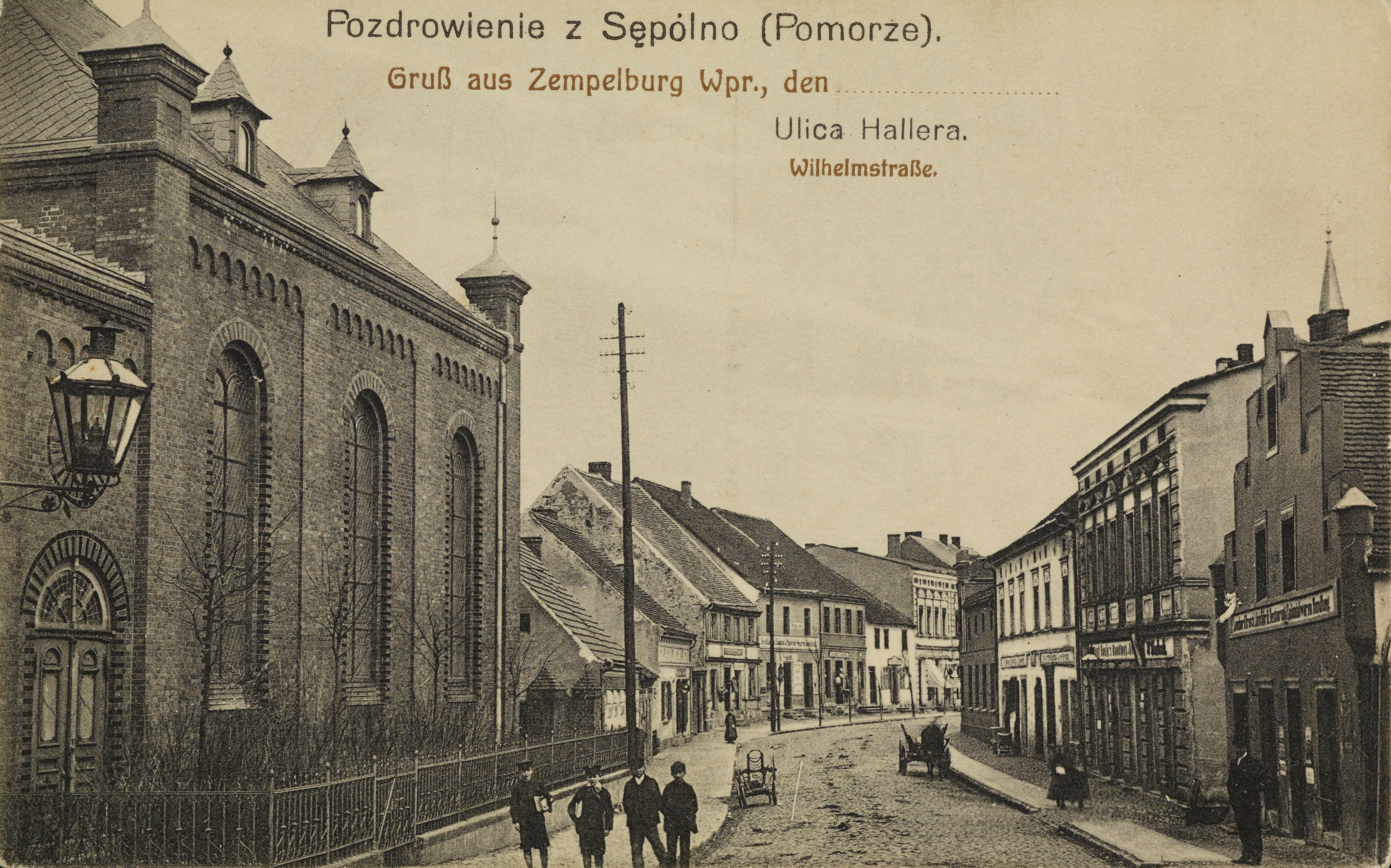
Wilhelm Street 1906-1918

In 1871, the town became part of the German Empire. The town then formed part of the Flatow district in the administrative district of Marienwerder in the province of West Prussia until 1919. It was a center for the textile and shoemaking industries. Despite Germanisation policies, Poles established various organisations, including the Bank Ludowy ("People's Bank") in 1910. The town had 3818 inhabitants in 1910, of which 637 were Poles. In terms of religion, in 1905 there were 57.0% Protestants, 32.7% Catholics and 10.3% Jews.

After the First World War, in 1920, Poland regained independence and control of the Sępólno. It became the seat of Sępólno County within the Pomeranian Voivodeship. The remaining German-speaking residents became the ethnic minority of German Poles.

=== World War II ===
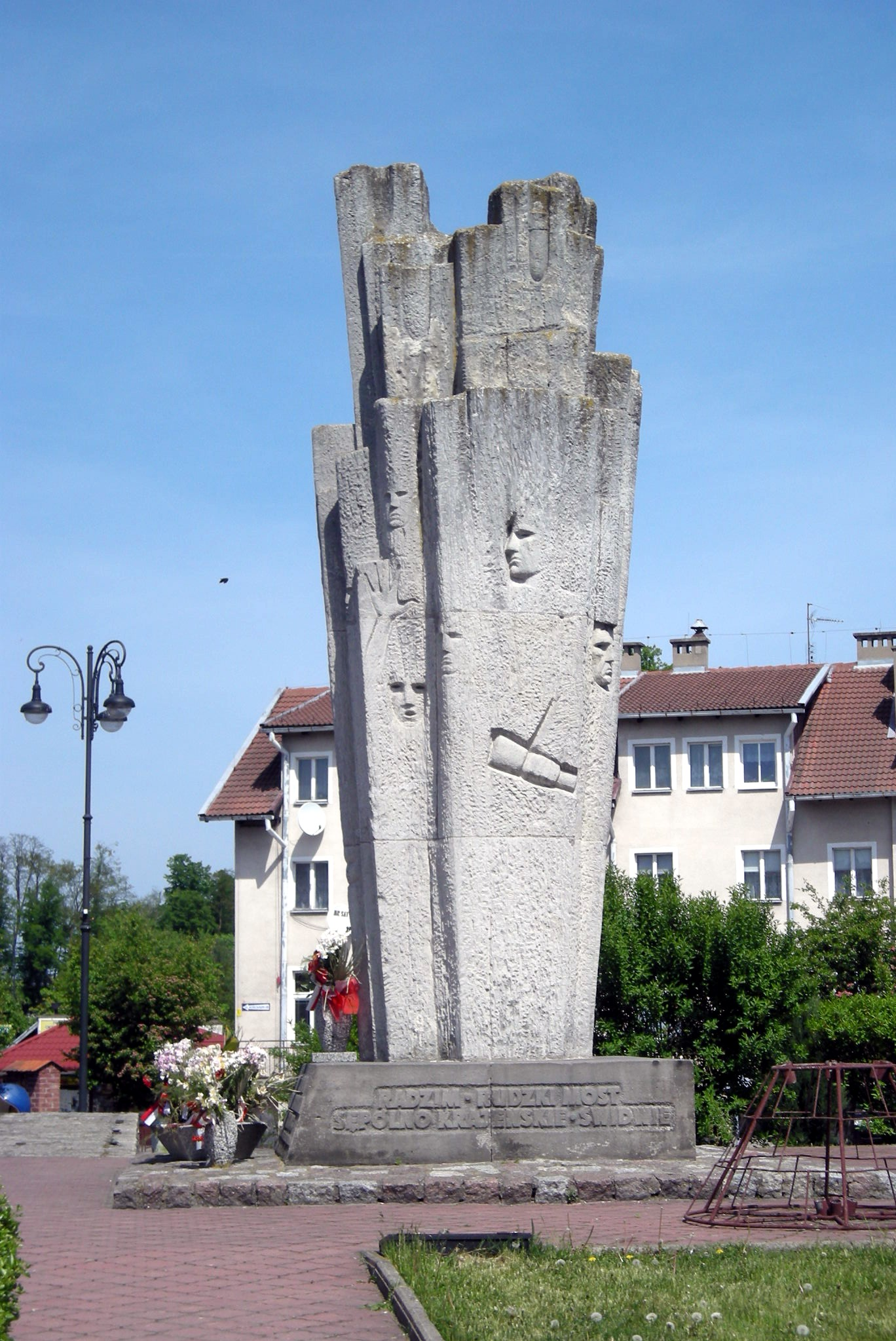
Monument to the victims of the German occupation

Sępólno was invaded by Nazi Germany on September 1, 1939, the first day of World War II, and was later annexed and made the seat of Zempelburg district within the Reichsgau Danzig-West Prussia. During the German occupation, Poles were subject to persecutions, mass arrests, Germanisation, expulsions and massacres. Numerous Poles were imprisoned in a concentration camp in Radzim and in a prison established by the Selbstschutz in Sępólno, and later murdered on site or deported to other Nazi concentration camps. Mass arrests of Poles were carried out from September 1939, and the first executions of Polish inhabitants were carried out by the Germans at the turn of September and October 1939. Mass executions of Poles in Sępólno were carried out in various places, for example on the railway tracks connecting Sępólno and Kamień Krajeński (in October 1939), at the primary school and at the shooting range (in November 1939), local Poles were also murdered in Radzim, Karolewo, Rudzki Most. Local Jews were also murdered in Radzim.

In early 1945, the town was captured by the Soviets, who plundered the town, sexual abused residents, deported Germans to Siberia, and fought the Polish underground resistance movement. Afterwards the town was restored to Poland.

== Demographics ==
Historical population

Year	Pop.	±%
1783	1,628	—
1805	2,492	+53.1%
1853	3,178	+27.5%
1875	3,516	+10.6%
1880	3,736	+6.3%

Year	Pop.	±%
1890	3,510	−6.0%
1900	3,797	+8.2%
1910	3,818	+0.6%
1921	3,318	−13.1%
1931	3,992	+20.3%

Year	Pop.	±%
1939	4,481	+12.2%
1950	4,234	−5.5%
1960	5,357	+26.5%
2007	9,249	+72.7%

== Gallery ==
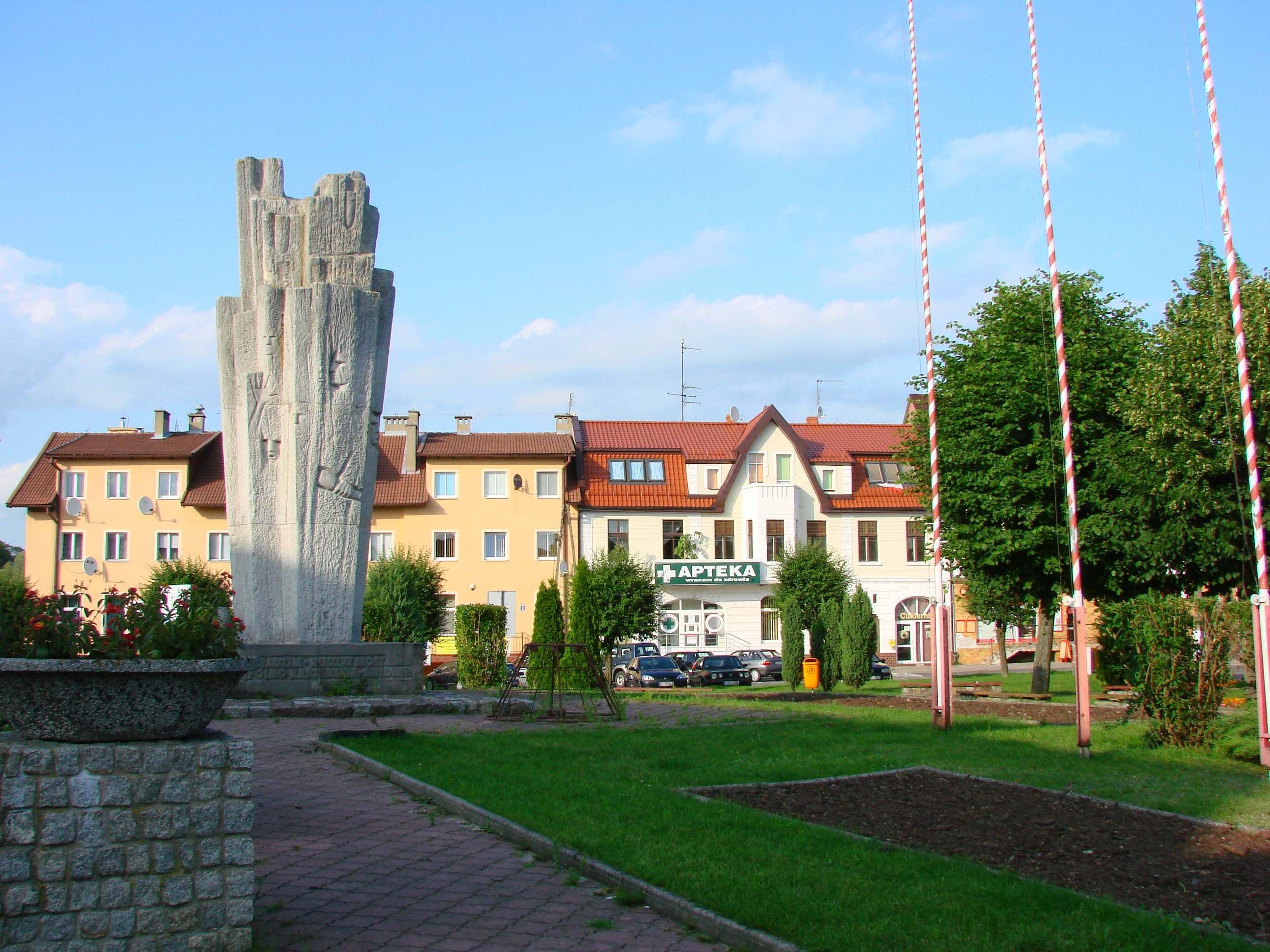
Market place (2012)

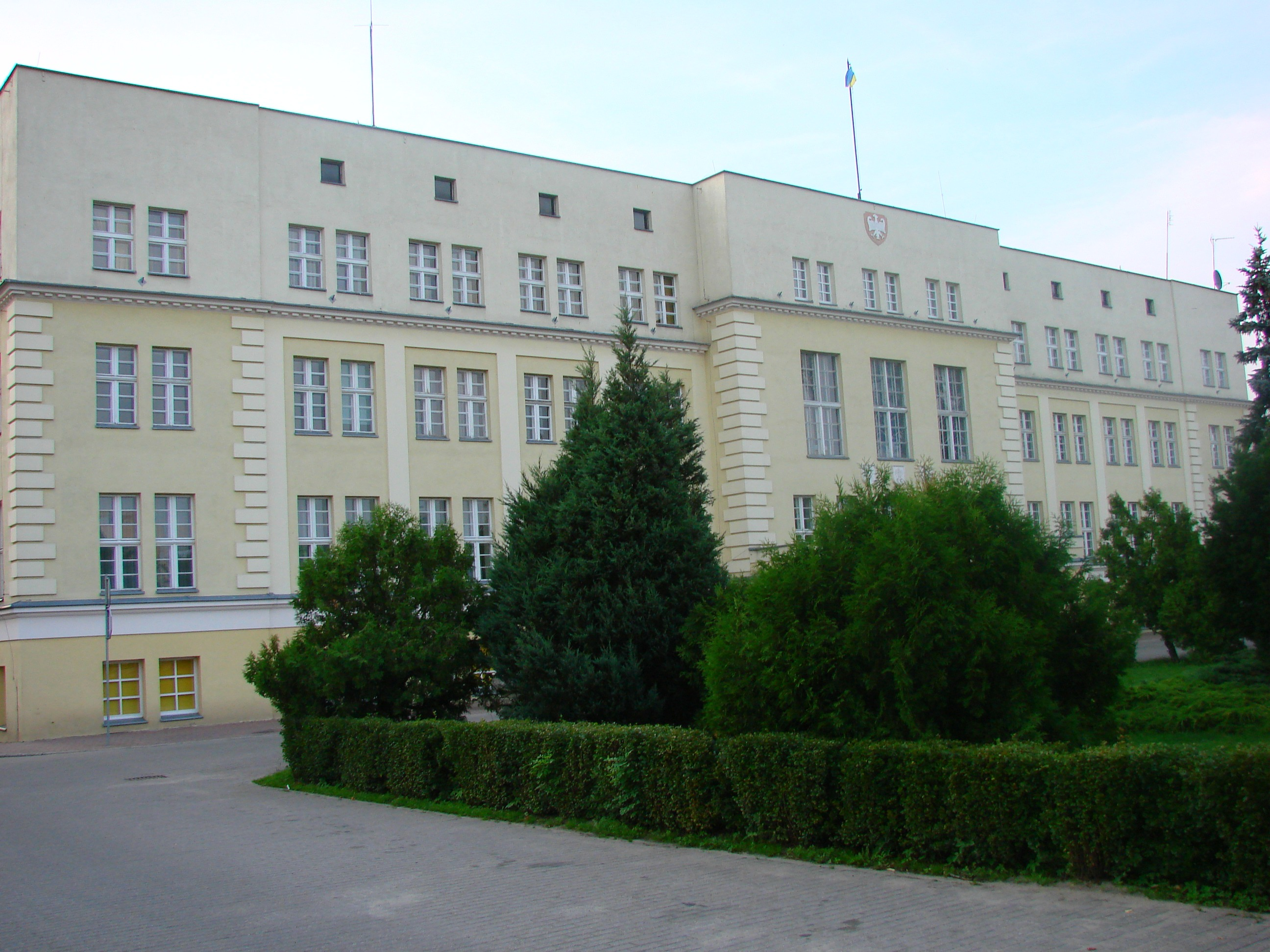
Town Hall

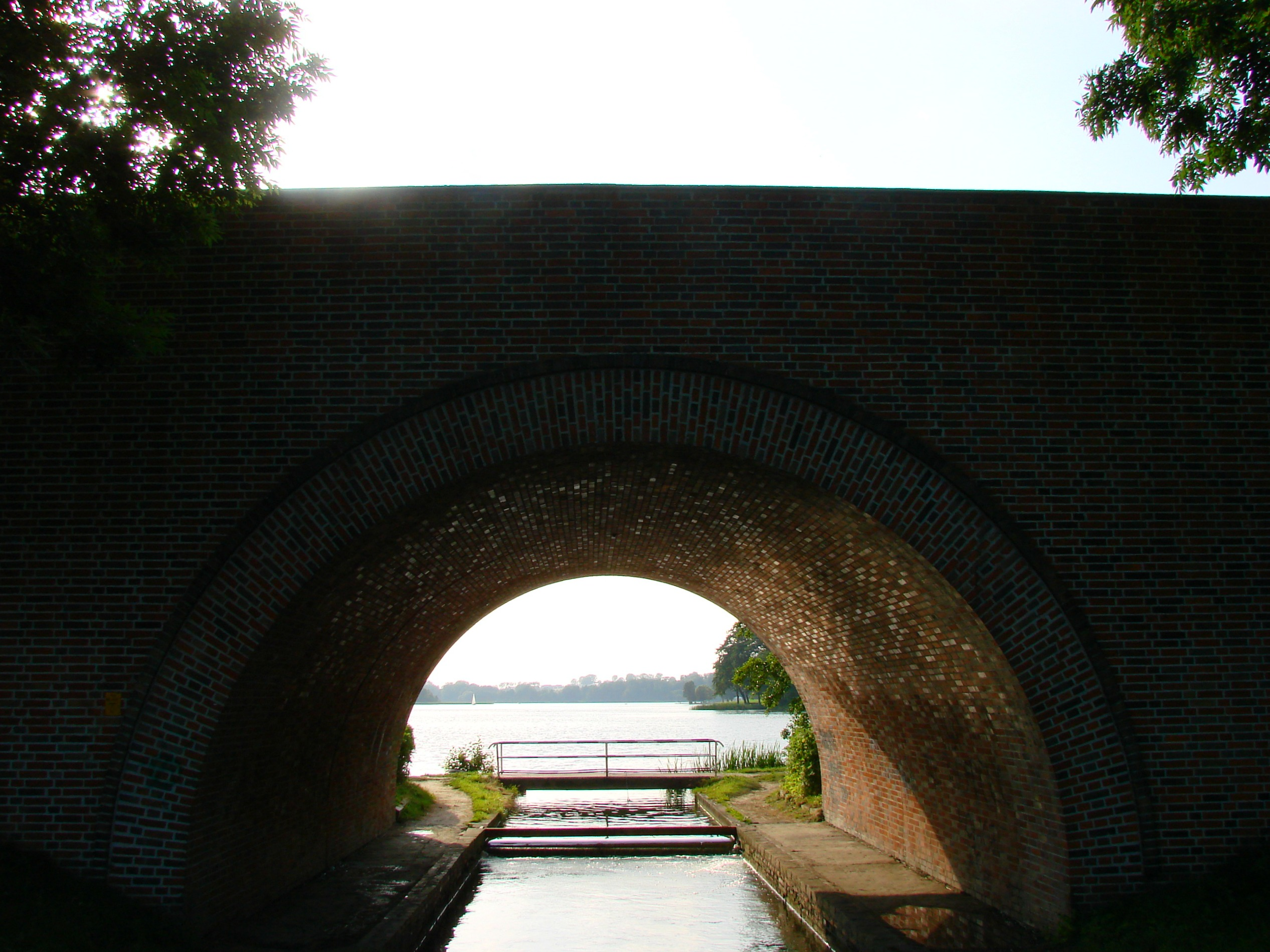
Bridge in the Old Town

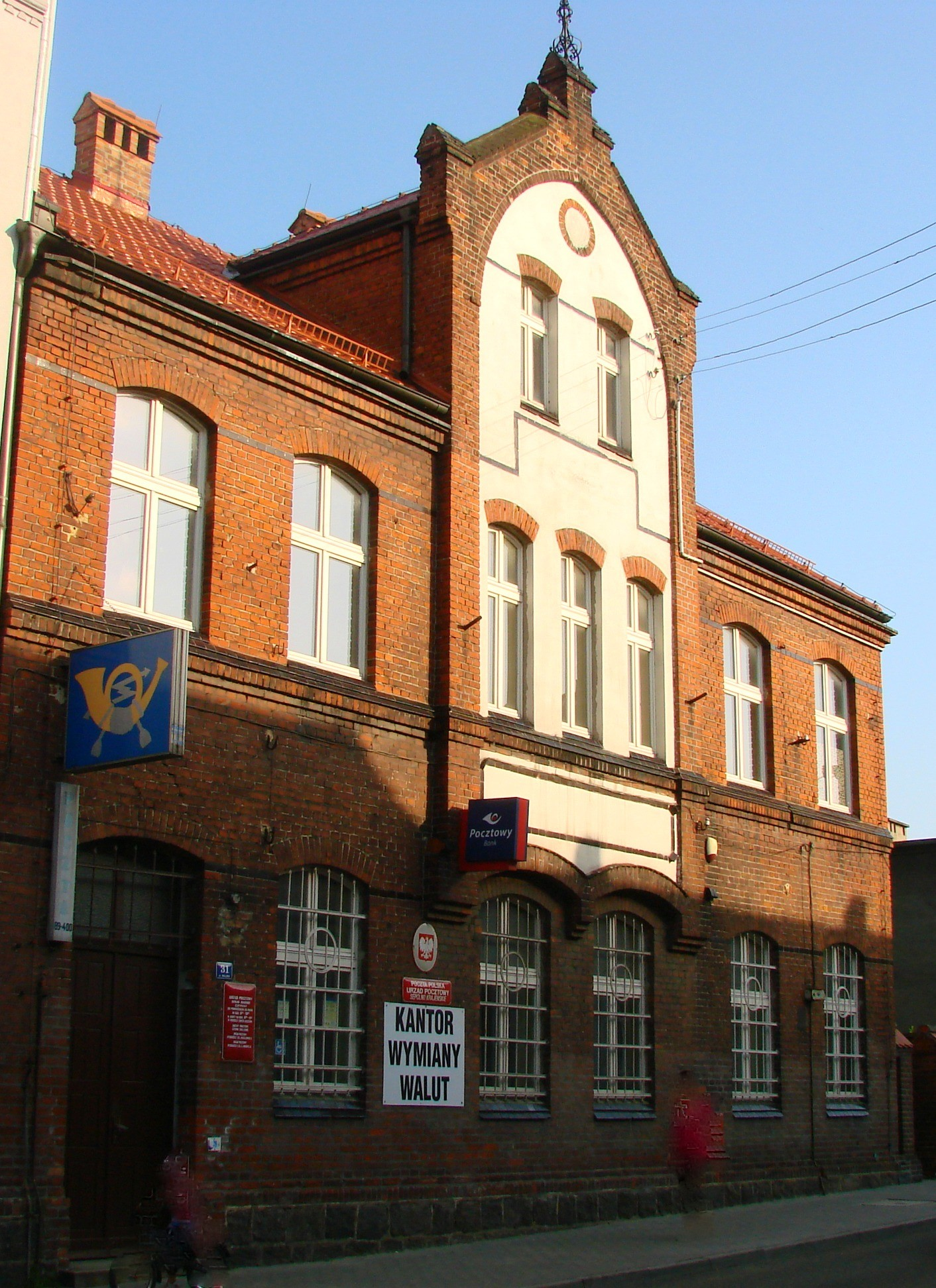
Post office

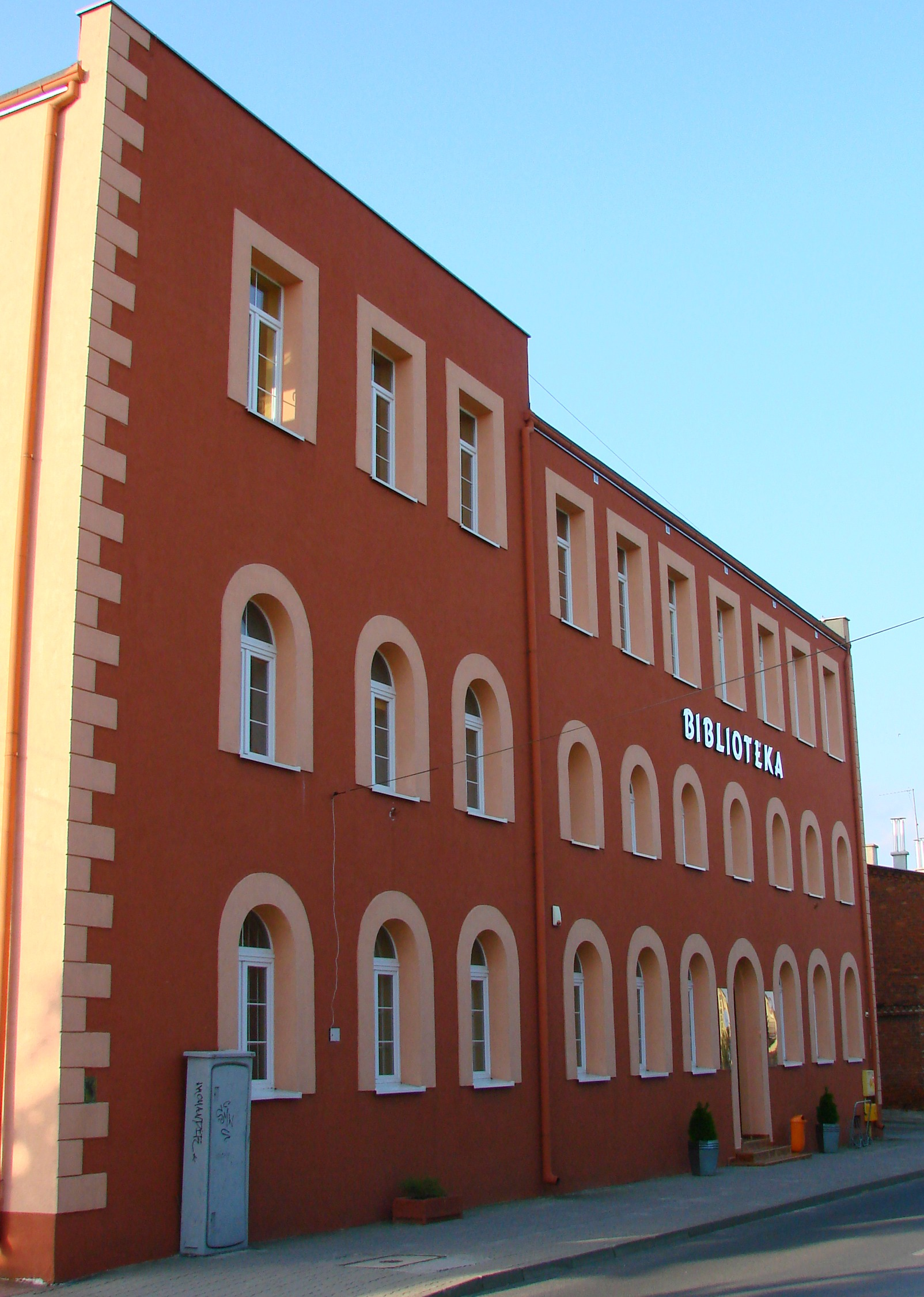
Public library

== Notable residents ==
- Moritz Brasch (1843–1895), philosopher
- Waldemar Jaskulski (born 1967), Polish international footballer
- Aaron ben Eliezer Lipman (mid-seventeenth century), rabbi
